= Candidates of the 1976 Tasmanian state election =

The 1976 Tasmanian state election was held on 11 December 1976.

== Retiring Members ==
=== Labor ===
- Joseph Britton MHA (Braddon)
- Mac Le Fevre MHA (Bass)
- Sydney Ward MHA (Braddon)

=== Liberal ===
- Wilfred Barker MHA (Braddon)

== House of Assembly ==
Sitting members are shown in bold text. Tickets that elected at least one MHA are highlighted in the relevant colour. Successful candidates are indicated by an asterisk (*).

=== Bass ===
Seven seats were up for election. The Labor Party was defending four seats. The Liberal Party was defending three seats.

Labor candidates	Liberal candidates	UTG candidates	Ungrouped candidates
**Michael Barnard***; Ursula Workman; **Harry Holgate***; Myron Tripp; **David Farquhar**; John Breen; Gill James*; Thomas O'Byrne	Dawn Rhodes; William Luck; **Bill Beattie***; **Max Bushby***; **Neil Pitt**; John Beswick; Neil Robson*; Dick Archer; Jim Mooney*	Deidre Smith; Bob Brown; Noreen Batchelor	Quentin Wilson

=== Braddon ===
Seven seats were up for election. The Labor Party was defending five seats. The Liberal Party was defending two seats.

Labor candidates	Liberal candidates	Ungrouped candidates
Ted Vickers; Christopher Wright; Maurice Dart; Graeme Smith; **Geoff Chisholm***; Michael Field*; **Glen Davies***; **John Coughlan***	Ron Cornish*; Kent Furmage; Eric Bessell; Roger Groom*; **Ray Bonney***; Harold Dowling; Harold Hawkes; Frank Atkins	Philip Kelly

=== Denison ===
Seven seats were up for election. The Labor Party was defending four seats. The Liberal Party was defending three seats.

Labor candidates	Liberal candidates	UTG candidates	Workers candidates	SWP candidates
**Neil Batt***; Thomas Gascoigne; Julian Amos*; Margaret Thurstans; **Ken Austin**; **Ian Cole**; Des Lavey; **John Green***	**Max Bingham***; Max Robinson*; Basil Giffard; Rudge Townley; **Robert Mather***; **Bob Baker***; David Brownlow; Hank Petrusma	Rod Broadby; Kevin Hazelwood; Helen Gee; David Stephen; Patricia Armstrong; Patricia Jones; William Hickson	Lance Buckingham; Peter Mollon	Rosanne Fidler; John Tully

=== Franklin ===
Seven seats were up for election. The Labor Party was defending four seats. The Liberal Party was defending three seats.

Labor candidates	Liberal candidates	UTG candidates	Ungrouped candidates
**Eric Barnard***; **Doug Lowe***; Bill McKinnon; Raymond Woodruff; Peter Brown; **Jack Frost**; **Bill Neilson***; Barrie Robinson; Ray Sherry*	**John Beattie***; Thomas Dempsey; **Doug Clark**; Steve Gilmour*; Alan Duggan; **Geoff Pearsall***; Frank O'Connor; Roy Pallett	Ria Ikin; Sharyn Harrison-Williams; John Levett; Michael Davies; Judith Walker; Rosemary Brown; Brian Chapman	Roger Francis; Bryan Threlfall; Harry Priest; Leo Jarvis

=== Wilmot ===
Seven seats were up for election. The Labor Party was defending four seats. The Liberal Party was defending three seats.

Labor candidates	Liberal candidates	UTG candidates	Workers candidates	Ungrouped candidates
Gordon Edhouse; **Michael Polley***; **Darrel Baldock***; Terry Aulich*; Allan Rhodes; **Andrew Lohrey***; **Charles Batt**; Graham Vertigan	Graeme Page*; D L Youd; Clyde FitzGerald; **Ian Braid***; **Bert Bessell**; Robin Gray*; Trevor Roach; Jim Burn; **Bob Ingamells**	Anthony Burke; Anthony Joyce; Roy Jackson	Stewart Lester; Kevin Chaffey	Stan King

== See also ==
- Members of the Tasmanian House of Assembly, 1972–1976
- Members of the Tasmanian House of Assembly, 1976–1979
