= Members of the Tasmanian House of Assembly, 1972–1976 =

This is a list of members of the Tasmanian House of Assembly between the 22 April 1972 election and the 11 December 1976 election.

Name	Party	Division	Years in office
Ken Austin	Labor	Denison	1964–1976
Bob Baker	Liberal	Denison	1969–1980
Darrel Baldock	Labor	Wilmot	1972–1987
Wilfred Barker	Liberal	Braddon	1964–1976
Eric Barnard	Labor	Franklin	1959–1979
Hon Michael Barnard	Labor	Bass	1969–1986
Charles Batt^{[2]}	Labor	Wilmot	1974–1976
Hon Neil Batt	Labor	Denison	1969–1980; 1986–1989
Bill Beattie	Liberal	Bass	1946–1950; 1954–1979
John Beattie	Liberal	Franklin	1972–1989
Bert Bessell	Liberal	Wilmot	1956–1976
Hon Angus Bethune^{[7]}	Liberal	Wilmot	1946–1975
Hon Max Bingham	Liberal	Denison	1969–1984
Ray Bonney	Liberal	Braddon	1972–1986
Ian Braid^{[7]}	Liberal	Wilmot	1969–1972; 1975–1995
Joseph Britton^{[5]}	Labor	Braddon	1959–1964; 1975–1976
Max Bushby	Liberal	Bass	1961–1986
Geoff Chisholm	Labor	Braddon	1964–1979
Doug Clark	Liberal	Franklin	1964–1976
Ian Cole^{[1]}	Labor	Denison	1974–1976
Kevin Corby^{[4]}	Labor	Denison	1972–1974
Hon Lloyd Costello^{[6]}	Labor	Braddon	1959–1975
John Coughlan^{[6]}	Labor	Braddon	1975–1986
Glen Davies	Labor	Braddon	1972–1986
Hon Merv Everett^{[1]}	Labor	Denison	1964–1974
Hon Roy Fagan^{[2]}	Labor	Wilmot	1946–1974
David Farquhar	Labor	Bass	1972–1976
Hon Dr Allan Foster^{[3]}	Labor	Bass	1969–1974
Jack Frost	Labor	Franklin	1964–1976
John Green^{[4]}	Labor	Denison	1974–1980
Harry Holgate^{[3]}	Labor	Bass	1974–1992
Bob Ingamells	Liberal	Wilmot	1959–1976
Mac Le Fevre	Labor	Bass	1959–1969, 1972–1976
Andrew Lohrey	Labor	Wilmot	1972–1986
Hon Doug Lowe	Labor	Franklin	1969–1986
Robert Mather	Liberal	Denison	1964–1982
Hon Bill Neilson	Labor	Franklin	1946–1977
Geoff Pearsall	Liberal	Franklin	1969–1988
Neil Pitt	Liberal	Bass	1972–1976
Michael Polley	Labor	Wilmot	1972–2014
Hon Eric Reece^{[5]}	Labor	Braddon	1946–1975
Hon Sydney Ward	Labor	Braddon	1956–1976

== Notes ==
^{1} Labor MHA for Denison, Merv Everett, resigned on 12 April 1974 to contest an Australian Senate seat at the 1974 federal election. Ian Cole was elected as his replacement at a recount on 27 April 1974.
^{2} Labor MHA for Wilmot, Roy Fagan, retired on 15 July 1974. Charles Batt was elected as his replacement at a recount on 29 July 1974.
^{3} Labor MHA for Bass, Dr Allan Foster, resigned on 15 July 1974 after a car accident. Harry Holgate was elected as his replacement at a recount on 29 July 1974.
^{4} Labor MHA for Denison, Kevin Corby, resigned on 5 August 1974. John Green was elected as his replacement at a recount on 19 August 1974.
^{5} Labor MHA for Braddon, Eric Reece, resigned on 31 March 1975 after the Labor Party set the retiring age of MPs at 65 (he was 65 and 8 months at the time). Joseph Britton was elected as his replacement at a recount on 12 April 1975.
^{6} Labor MHA for Braddon, Lloyd Costello, resigned in April 1975. John Coughlan was elected as his replacement at a recount on 16 May 1975.
^{7} Liberal MHA for Wilmot, Angus Bethune, resigned on 30 June 1975. Ian Braid was elected as his replacement at a recount on 14 July 1975.

== Sources ==
- Parliament of Tasmania (2006). The Parliament of Tasmania from 1856
