= Electoral results for the Division of Braddon (state) =

This is a list of electoral results for the division of Braddon in Tasmanian elections since 1913.

== Election results ==
=== Elections in the 2020s ===
==== 2025 ====

2025 Tasmanian state election: Braddon
| Party | Candidate | Votes | % | ±% |
|---|---|---|---|---|
| Quota | | 8,836 | | |
| Liberal | Jeremy Rockliff (elected 1) | 22,273 | 31.5 | +3.9 |
| Liberal | Gavin Pearce (elected 2) | 5,175 | 7.3 | +7.3 |
| Liberal | Felix Ellis (elected 4) | 3,129 | 4.4 | −2.9 |
| Liberal | Roger Jaensch (elected 6) | 1,849 | 2.6 | −1.2 |
| Liberal | Giovanna Simpson | 1,155 | 1.6 | −1.0 |
| Liberal | Stephen Parry | 855 | 1.2 | +1.2 |
| Liberal | Kate Wylie | 762 | 1.1 | +1.1 |
| Labor | Anita Dow (elected 5) | 5,770 | 8.2 | +0.0 |
| Labor | Shane Broad (elected 7) | 4,589 | 5.9 | −0.6 |
| Labor | Kelly 'Hooch' Hunt | 1,829 | 2.6 | +2.6 |
| Labor | Amanda Diprose | 1,578 | 2.2 | +0.1 |
| Labor | Cheryl Fuller | 1,319 | 2.2 | +2.2 |
| Labor | Tara Woodhouse | 958 | 1.4 | +1.4 |
| Labor | Adrian Luke | 924 | 1.3 | −0.1 |
| Independent | Craig Garland (elected 3) | 7,227 | 10.2 | +5.1 |
| Greens | Vanessa Bleyer | 1,924 | 2.7 | +2.7 |
| Greens | Erin Morrow | 773 | 1.1 | +0.7 |
| Greens | Scott Jordan | 411 | 0.9 | +0.9 |
| Greens | Susanne Ward | 403 | 0.8 | +0.2 |
| Greens | Petra Wilden | 494 | 0.7 | +0.2 |
| Greens | Thomas Kingston | 429 | 0.6 | +0.6 |
| Greens | Haru Fergus | 392 | 0.5 | +0.5 |
| Shooters, Fishers, Farmers | Adrian Pickin | 2,355 | 3.3 | +3.3 |
| Group B Independent | Adam Martin | 849 | 1.2 | +1.2 |
| Group B Independent | James Redgrave | 195 | 0.3 | −3.7 |
| Group B Independent | Malcolm Ryan | 184 | 0.3 | +0.3 |
| Group B Independent | Andrea Courtney | 140 | 0.2 | +0.0 |
| Group B Independent | Cristale Harrison | 126 | 0.2 | +0.2 |
| Group B Independent | Claudia Baldock | 92 | 0.1 | +0.1 |
| National | Miriam Beswick | 767 | 1.1 | −3.1 |
| National | Andrew Roberts | 357 | 0.5 | +0.5 |
| Independent | Joel Badcock | 501 | 0.7 | +0.7 |
| Independent | Matthew Morgan | 145 | 0.2 | +0.2 |
| Independent | Jennifer Hamilton | 126 | 0.2 | +0.2 |
| Independent | Dami Wells | 119 | 0.2 | +0.2 |
| Independent | Gatty Burnett | 90 | 0.1 | −0.1 |
| Independent | Ernst Millet | 70 | 0.1 | +0.1 |
| Total formal votes | | 70,686 | 93.4 | +0.2 |
| Informal votes | | 5,012 | 6.6 | −0.2 |
| Turnout | | 75,698 | 89.5 | −1.4 |
Party total votes
| Liberal | | 35,198 | 49.8 | +4.2 |
| Labor | | 16,763 | 23.7 | −1.0 |
| Independent | Craig Garland | 7,277 | 10.2 | +5.1 |
| Greens | | 5,240 | 7.4 | +0.8 |
| Shooters, Fishers, Farmers | | 2,355 | 3.3 | +0.4 |
| Group B Independent | | 1,586 | 2.2 | +2.2 |
| National | | 1,124 | 1.6 | +1.6 |
| Independent | Joel Badcock | 501 | 0.7 | +0.7 |
| Independent | Matthew Morgan | 145 | 0.2 | +0.2 |
| Independent | Jennifer Hamilton | 126 | 0.2 | +0.2 |
| Independent | Dami Wells | 119 | 0.2 | +0.2 |
| Independent | Gatty Burnett | 90 | 0.1 | −0.1 |
| Independent | Ernst Millet | 70 | 0.1 | +0.1 |
| Liberal gain from Lambie Network | | | | |

==== 2024 ====
2024 Tasmanian state election: Braddon
| Party | Candidate | Votes | % | ±% |
|---|---|---|---|---|
| Quota | | 8,875 | | |
| Liberal | Jeremy Rockliff (elected 1) | 19,573 | 27.6 | +0.1 |
| Liberal | Felix Ellis (elected 2) | 5,163 | 7.3 | −1.6 |
| Liberal | Roger Jaensch (elected 4) | 2,704 | 3.8 | −3.1 |
| Liberal | Giovanna Simpson | 1,852 | 2.6 | +2.6 |
| Liberal | Vonette Mead | 1,467 | 2.1 | +2.1 |
| Liberal | Patrick Fabian | 858 | 1.2 | +1.2 |
| Liberal | Sarina Laidler | 787 | 1.1 | +1.1 |
| Labor | Anita Dow (elected 3) | 5,816 | 8.2 | +0.1 |
| Labor | Shane Broad (elected 5) | 4,589 | 6.5 | −2.2 |
| Labor | Chris Lynch | 2,319 | 3.3 | +3.3 |
| Labor | Amanda Diprose | 1,504 | 2.1 | +0.2 |
| Labor | Samantha Facey | 1,319 | 1.9 | +1.9 |
| Labor | Adrian Luke | 1,017 | 1.4 | +1.4 |
| Labor | Danielle Kidd | 969 | 1.4 | +1.4 |
| Lambie | Miriam Beswick (elected 6) | 2,951 | 4.2 | +4.2 |
| Lambie | James Redgrave | 2,776 | 3.9 | +3.9 |
| Lambie | Craig Cutts | 2,352 | 3.3 | +3.3 |
| Greens | Darren Briggs | 2,493 | 3.5 | +0.9 |
| Greens | Sarah Kersey | 411 | 0.6 | +0.6 |
| Greens | Susanne Ward | 403 | 0.6 | +0.6 |
| Greens | Leeya Lovell | 364 | 0.5 | +0.5 |
| Greens | Petra Wilden | 359 | 0.5 | +0.5 |
| Greens | Michael McLoughlin | 357 | 0.5 | +0.5 |
| Greens | Erin Morrow | 314 | 0.4 | +0.4 |
| Independent | Craig Garland (elected 7) | 3,638 | 5.1 | −0.9 |
| Shooters, Fishers, Farmers | Dale Marshall | 890 | 1.3 | +1.3 |
| Shooters, Fishers, Farmers | Brenton Jones | 706 | 1.0 | −1.4 |
| Shooters, Fishers, Farmers | Kim Swanson | 452 | 0.6 | −0.8 |
| Independent | Peter Freshney | 1,281 | 1.8 | +1.8 |
| Animal Justice | Julia M King | 866 | 1.2 | +1.2 |
| Independent | Andrea Courtney | 168 | 0.2 | +0.2 |
| Independent | Liz Hamer | 149 | 0.2 | −0.3 |
| Independent | Gatty Burnett | 127 | 0.2 | +0.2 |
| Total formal votes | | 70,994 | 93.2 | −1.5 |
| Informal votes | | 5,220 | 6.8 | +1.5 |
| Turnout | | 76,214 | 90.9 | −0.2 |
Party total votes
| Liberal | | 32,404 | 45.6 | −11.6 |
| Labor | | 17,533 | 24.7 | −1.8 |
| Lambie | | 8,079 | 11.4 | +11.4 |
| Greens | | 4,701 | 6.6 | +1.1 |
| Independent | Craig Garland | 3,638 | 5.1 | –0.9 |
| Shooters, Fishers, Farmers | | 2,048 | 2.9 | –0.9 |
| Independent | Peter Freshney | 1,281 | 1.8 | +1.8 |
| Animal Justice | | 866 | 1.2 | +1.2 |
| Independent | Andrea Courtney | 168 | 0.2 | +0.2 |
| Independent | Liz Hamer | 149 | 0.2 | –0.3 |
| Independent | Gatty Burnett | 127 | 0.2 | +0.2 |

==== 2021 ====
2021 Tasmanian state election: Braddon
| Party | Candidate | Votes | % | ±% |
|---|---|---|---|---|
| Quota | | 11,661 | | |
| Liberal | Jeremy Rockliff (elected 1) | 19,186 | 27.4 | +1.6 |
| Liberal | Felix Ellis | 6,229 | 8.9 | +6.0 |
| Liberal | Adam Brooks (elected 5) | 6,202 | 8.9 | −6.7 |
| Liberal | Roger Jaensch (elected 4) | 4,833 | 6.9 | +0.4 |
| Liberal | Lara Hendriks | 1,856 | 2.7 | +2.7 |
| Liberal | Stacey Sheehan | 1,708 | 2.4 | +2.4 |
| Labor | Shane Broad (elected 3) | 6,034 | 8.6 | +0.3 |
| Labor | Anita Dow (elected 2) | 5,640 | 8.1 | −0.7 |
| Labor | Justine Keay | 4,132 | 5.9 | +5.9 |
| Labor | Michelle Rippon | 1,454 | 2.1 | +2.1 |
| Labor | Amanda Diprose | 1,300 | 1.9 | +1.9 |
| Independent | Craig Garland | 4,236 | 6.1 | +3.0 |
| Greens | Darren Briggs | 1,853 | 2.6 | +2.6 |
| Greens | Tammy Milne | 670 | 1.0 | +1.0 |
| Greens | Emily Murray | 584 | 0.8 | +0.8 |
| Greens | Phill Parsons | 403 | 0.6 | +0.6 |
| Greens | Maureen Corbett | 372 | 0.5 | +0.5 |
| Shooters, Fishers, Farmers | Brenton Jones | 1,648 | 2.4 | +2.4 |
| Shooters, Fishers, Farmers | Kim Swanson | 990 | 1.4 | +1.4 |
| Independent | Liz Hamer | 337 | 0.5 | +0.3 |
| Independent | Matthew Morgan | 294 | 0.4 | +0.4 |
| Total formal votes | | 69,961 | 94.6 | +0.2 |
| Informal votes | | 3,963 | 5.4 | −0.2 |
| Turnout | | 73,924 | 91.0 | −1.5 |
Party total votes
| Liberal | | 40,014 | 57.2 | +1.1 |
| Labor | | 18,560 | 26.5 | −0.8 |
| Independent | Craig Garland | 4,236 | 6.1 | +6.1 |
| Greens | | 3,882 | 5.5 | +2.0 |
| Shooters, Fishers, Farmers | | 2,638 | 3.8 | +3.8 |
| Independent | Liz Hamer | 337 | 0.5 | +0.5 |
| Independent | Matthew Morgan | 294 | 0.4 | +0.4 |
| Liberal hold | | Swing | +1.6 | |
| Liberal hold | | Swing | –6.7 | |
| Liberal hold | | Swing | +0.4 | |
| Labor hold | | Swing | +0.3 | |
| Labor hold | | Swing | –0.7 | |

=== Elections in the 2010s ===
==== 2018 ====
2018 Tasmanian state election: Braddon
| Party | Candidate | Votes | % | ±% |
|---|---|---|---|---|
| Quota | | 10,719 | | |
| Liberal | Jeremy Rockliff (elected 1) | 16,612 | 25.8 | +0.8 |
| Liberal | Adam Brooks (elected 2) | 10,004 | 15.6 | −8.0 |
| Liberal | Roger Jaensch (elected 5) | 4,171 | 6.5 | +1.8 |
| Liberal | Joan Rylah | 3,436 | 5.3 | +1.2 |
| Liberal | Felix Ellis | 1,842 | 2.9 | +2.9 |
| Labor | Anita Dow (elected 3) | 5,637 | 8.8 | +8.8 |
| Labor | Shane Broad (elected 4) | 5,336 | 8.3 | +4.2 |
| Labor | Themba Bulle | 2,757 | 4.3 | +4.3 |
| Labor | Danielle Kidd | 2,113 | 3.3 | +3.3 |
| Labor | Wayne Roberts | 1,709 | 2.7 | +2.7 |
| Lambie | Gina Timms | 1,139 | 1.8 | +1.8 |
| Lambie | Rodney Flowers | 818 | 1.3 | +1.3 |
| Lambie | Roz Flanagan | 682 | 1.1 | +1.1 |
| Lambie | Tim Lovell | 610 | 0.9 | +0.9 |
| Lambie | Colin Smith | 556 | 0.9 | +0.9 |
| Greens | Scott Jordan | 1,205 | 1.9 | +1.9 |
| Greens | Sally O'Wheel | 352 | 0.5 | +0.5 |
| Greens | Julie Norbury | 295 | 0.5 | +0.5 |
| Greens | Tom Kingston | 238 | 0.4 | +0.4 |
| Greens | Philip Nicholas | 207 | 0.3 | −0.2 |
| Independent | Craig Garland | 1,967 | 3.1 | +3.1 |
| Shooters, Fishers, Farmers | Glen Saltmarsh | 580 | 0.9 | +0.9 |
| Shooters, Fishers, Farmers | Brett Neal | 459 | 0.7 | +0.7 |
| Shooters, Fishers, Farmers | Brenton Jones | 330 | 0.5 | +0.5 |
| Shooters, Fishers, Farmers | Kim Swanson | 242 | 0.4 | +0.4 |
| Independent | Brenton Best | 593 | 0.9 | +0.9 |
| Tasmanians 4 Tasmania | Steven Honey | 164 | 0.3 | +0.3 |
| Tasmanians 4 Tasmania | Cherie Halkett | 112 | 0.2 | +0.2 |
| Independent | Liz Hamer | 141 | 0.2 | +0.2 |
| Total formal votes | | 64,307 | 94.4 | −0.5 |
| Informal votes | | 3,791 | 5.6 | +0.5 |
| Turnout | | 68,908 | 92.5 | −1.3 |
Party total votes
| Liberal | | 36,065 | 56.1 | −2.7 |
| Labor | | 17,552 | 27.3 | +4.1 |
| Lambie | | 3,805 | 5.9 | +5.9 |
| Greens | | 2,297 | 3.6 | −3.5 |
| Independent | Craig Garland | 1,967 | 3.1 | +3.1 |
| Shooters, Fishers, Farmers | | 1,611 | 2.5 | +2.5 |
| Independent | Brenton Best | 593 | 0.9 | +0.9 |
| Tasmanians 4 Tasmania | | 276 | 0.4 | +0.4 |
| Independent | Liz Hamer | 141 | 0.2 | +0.2 |
| Liberal hold | | Swing | +0.8 | |
| Liberal hold | | Swing | –8.0 | |
| Liberal hold | | Swing | +1.8 | |
| Labor hold | | Swing | +8.8 | |
| Labor gain from Liberal | | Swing | +4.2 | |

==== 2014 ====
2014 Tasmanian state election: Braddon
| Party | Candidate | Votes | % | ±% |
|---|---|---|---|---|
| Quota | | 10,716 | | |
| Liberal | Adam Brooks (elected 1) | 16,073 | 25.0 | +14.2 |
| Liberal | Jeremy Rockliff (elected 2) | 15,168 | 23.6 | +6.5 |
| Liberal | Roger Jaensch (elected 4) | 3,009 | 4.7 | +4.7 |
| Liberal | Joan Rylah (elected 5) | 2,633 | 4.1 | +4.1 |
| Liberal | Kyron Howell | 895 | 1.4 | +1.4 |
| Labor | Bryan Green (elected 3) | 6,606 | 10.3 | −7.1 |
| Labor | Brenton Best | 3,648 | 5.7 | −5.3 |
| Labor | Shane Broad | 2,654 | 4.1 | −1.0 |
| Labor | Justine Keay | 1,382 | 2.1 | +2.1 |
| Labor | Darryl Bessell | 653 | 1.0 | +1.0 |
| Palmer United | Kevin Morgan | 2,291 | 3.6 | +3.6 |
| Palmer United | Steve Green | 847 | 1.3 | +1.3 |
| Palmer United | Kev Deakin | 539 | 0.8 | +0.8 |
| Palmer United | Scott Alexander | 533 | 0.8 | +0.8 |
| Palmer United | Julian Brown | 404 | 0.6 | +0.6 |
| Greens | Paul O'Halloran | 3,294 | 5.1 | −3.8 |
| Greens | Melissa Houghton | 409 | 0.6 | −0.5 |
| Greens | Philip Nicholas | 314 | 0.5 | +0.5 |
| Greens | Sally O'Wheel | 253 | 0.4 | +0.4 |
| Greens | Chris Cornell | 249 | 0.4 | +0.4 |
| National | Ken Dorsey | 747 | 1.2 | +1.2 |
| National | Benji Benjamin | 507 | 0.8 | +0.8 |
| National | Liz van der Linde-Keep | 135 | 0.2 | +0.2 |
| Christians | Kevin Swarts | 535 | 0.8 | +0.8 |
| Independent | Mick Anderson | 412 | 0.6 | +0.6 |
| Independent | Tony Brown | 101 | 0.2 | +0.2 |
| Total formal votes | | 64,291 | 94.9 | −0.2 |
| Informal votes | | 3,466 | 5.1 | +0.2 |
| Turnout | | 67,757 | 93.8 | −0.3 |
Party total votes
| Liberal | | 37,778 | 58.8 | +13.6 |
| Labor | | 14,943 | 23.2 | −17.0 |
| Palmer United | | 4,614 | 7.2 | +7.2 |
| Greens | | 4,519 | 7.0 | −6.8 |
| National | | 1,389 | 2.2 | +2.2 |
| Christians | | 535 | 0.8 | +0.8 |
| Independent | Mick Anderson | 412 | 0.6 | +0.6 |
| Independent | Tony Brown | 101 | 0.2 | +0.2 |
| Liberal hold | | Swing | +14.2 | |
| Liberal hold | | Swing | +6.5 | |
| Liberal gain from Labor | | Swing | +4.7 | |
| Liberal gain from Greens | | Swing | +4.1 | |
| Labor hold | | Swing | –7.1 | |

==== 2010 ====
2010 Tasmanian state election: Braddon
| Party | Candidate | Votes | % | ±% |
|---|---|---|---|---|
| Quota | | 10,747 | | |
| Liberal | Jeremy Rockliff (elected 2) | 10,994 | 17.1 | +1.9 |
| Liberal | Adam Brooks (elected 4) | 6,972 | 10.8 | +10.8 |
| Liberal | Brett Whiteley | 5,547 | 8.6 | −0.1 |
| Liberal | Leonie Hiscutt | 2,715 | 4.2 | +4.2 |
| Liberal | Grant Dunham | 1,201 | 1.9 | +1.9 |
| Liberal | Philip Lamont | 1,115 | 1.7 | +1.7 |
| Liberal | Colin Lamont | 594 | 0.9 | +0.9 |
| Labor | Bryan Green (elected 1) | 11,221 | 17.4 | −7.0 |
| Labor | Brenton Best (elected 3) | 7,087 | 11.0 | +0.9 |
| Labor | Shane Broad | 3,303 | 5.1 | +5.1 |
| Labor | Judy Richmond | 2,309 | 3.6 | +3.6 |
| Labor | Kay Eastley | 2,027 | 3.1 | +3.1 |
| Greens | Paul O'Halloran (elected 5) | 5,718 | 8.9 | +2.1 |
| Greens | Ted Field | 894 | 1.4 | +1.4 |
| Greens | Clair Gilmour | 781 | 1.2 | +1.2 |
| Greens | David Henderson | 746 | 1.2 | +1.2 |
| Greens | Melissa Houghton | 735 | 1.1 | +1.1 |
| Independent | Timothy Kidd | 270 | 0.4 | +0.4 |
| Independent | Valerie Blake | 247 | 0.4 | +0.4 |
| Total formal votes | | 64,476 | 95.1 | −0.3 |
| Informal votes | | 3,297 | 4.9 | +0.3 |
| Turnout | | 67,773 | 94.1 | −1.0 |
Party total votes
| Liberal | | 29,138 | 45.2 | +8.6 |
| Labor | | 25,947 | 40.2 | −11.2 |
| Greens | | 8,874 | 13.8 | +3.4 |
| Independent | Timothy Kidd | 270 | 0.4 | +0.4 |
| Independent | Valerie Blake | 247 | 0.4 | +0.4 |

=== Elections in the 2000s ===
==== 2006 ====
2006 Tasmanian state election: Braddon
| Party | Candidate | Votes | % | ±% |
|---|---|---|---|---|
| Quota | | 10,552 | | |
| Labor | Bryan Green (elected 1) | 15,468 | 24.4 | +7.4 |
| Labor | Steve Kons (elected 3) | 6,988 | 11.0 | −3.0 |
| Labor | Brenton Best (elected 4) | 6,378 | 10.1 | −0.6 |
| Labor | Peter Hollister | 2,135 | 3.4 | +3.4 |
| Labor | Leonie Batchelor | 1,215 | 1.9 | +1.9 |
| Liberal | Jeremy Rockliff (elected 2) | 9,630 | 15.2 | +2.1 |
| Liberal | Brett Whiteley (elected 5) | 5,529 | 8.7 | +1.3 |
| Liberal | Heather Woodward | 3,179 | 5.0 | +5.0 |
| Liberal | Leon Perry | 2,977 | 4.7 | +4.7 |
| Liberal | John Oldaker | 2,280 | 3.6 | +3.6 |
| Greens | Paul O'Halloran | 4,297 | 6.8 | +0.3 |
| Greens | Andrea Jackson | 669 | 1.1 | +1.1 |
| Greens | Dianne Ransley | 624 | 1.0 | +1.0 |
| Greens | Scott Jordan | 545 | 0.9 | +0.9 |
| Greens | John Coombes | 394 | 0.6 | +0.6 |
| Independent | Steve Martin | 1,001 | 1.6 | +1.6 |
| Total formal votes | | 63,309 | 95.4 | +0.2 |
| Informal votes | | 3,085 | 4.6 | −0.2 |
| Turnout | | 66,394 | 95.1 | +0.8 |
Party total votes
| Labor | | 32,184 | 50.8 | −2.3 |
| Liberal | | 23,595 | 37.2 | +4.1 |
| Greens | | 6,529 | 10.4 | −1.7 |
| Independent | Steve Martin | 1,001 | 1.6 | +1.6 |

==== 2002 ====
2002 Tasmanian state election: Braddon
| Party | Candidate | Votes | % | ±% |
|---|---|---|---|---|
| Quota | | 10,140 | | |
| Labor | Bryan Green (elected 1) | 10,339 | 17.0 | +9.7 |
| Labor | Steve Kons (elected 3) | 8,517 | 14.0 | −3.6 |
| Labor | Brenton Best (elected 4) | 6,472 | 10.6 | +3.3 |
| Labor | Mike Gaffney | 5,720 | 9.4 | +9.4 |
| Labor | Renai Ellings | 711 | 1.2 | +1.2 |
| Labor | Harvey Clarke | 592 | 1.0 | +1.0 |
| Liberal | Jeremy Rockliff (elected 2) | 7,957 | 13.1 | +13.1 |
| Liberal | Brett Whiteley (elected 5) | 4,527 | 7.4 | +1.0 |
| Liberal | Mike Downie | 3,496 | 5.7 | +5.7 |
| Liberal | Alan Pattison | 3,040 | 5.0 | +5.0 |
| Liberal | Peter Upton | 1,130 | 1.9 | +1.9 |
| Greens | Paul O'Halloran | 3,943 | 6.5 | +6.1 |
| Greens | Clare Thompson | 1,317 | 2.2 | +1.9 |
| Greens | Felicity Harris | 790 | 1.3 | +1.3 |
| Greens | Carol Reilly | 640 | 1.1 | +1.1 |
| Greens | Patrick Johnson | 601 | 1.0 | +1.0 |
| Group D | Malcolm Ryan | 489 | 0.8 | +0.8 |
| Group D | John Kelly | 250 | 0.4 | +0.4 |
| Independent | Gatty Burnett | 307 | 0.5 | +0.5 |
| Total formal votes | | 60,838 | 95.2 | −0.6 |
| Informal votes | | 3,090 | 4.8 | +0.6 |
| Turnout | | 63,928 | 94.3 | −1.8 |
Party total votes
| Labor | | 32,351 | 53.2 | +9.1 |
| Liberal | | 20,150 | 33.1 | −9.1 |
| Greens | | 7,291 | 12.0 | +3.9 |
| Group D | | 739 | 1.2 | +1.2 |
| Independent | Gatty Burnett | 307 | 0.5 | +0.5 |

=== Elections in the 1990s ===
==== 1998 ====
1998 Tasmanian state election: Braddon
| Party | Candidate | Votes | % | ±% |
|---|---|---|---|---|
| Quota | | 9,355 | | |
| Labor | Steve Kons (elected 2) | 9,881 | 17.6 | +17.6 |
| Labor | Brenton Best (elected 3) | 4,087 | 7.3 | +2.9 |
| Labor | Bryan Green (elected 4) | 4,088 | 7.3 | +2.7 |
| Labor | Mike Gard | 2,272 | 4.0 | +1.4 |
| Labor | Peter Hollister | 2,007 | 3.6 | +3.6 |
| Labor | Ella Bramich | 1,585 | 2.8 | +2.8 |
| Labor | Stuart Mackey | 810 | 1.4 | +1.4 |
| Liberal | Tony Rundle (elected 1) | 12,903 | 23.0 | +13.2 |
| Liberal | Brett Whiteley | 3,599 | 6.4 | +6.4 |
| Liberal | Carole Cains | 3,365 | 6.0 | −0.2 |
| Liberal | Bill Bonde (elected 5) | 3,248 | 5.8 | −7.2 |
| Liberal | Michael Wickham | 602 | 1.1 | +0.1 |
| Greens | Di Hollister | 3,925 | 7.0 | −1.0 |
| Greens | Paul O'Halloran | 200 | 0.4 | +0.2 |
| Greens | Oliver Field | 170 | 0.3 | +0.3 |
| Greens | Clare Thompson | 164 | 0.3 | +0.3 |
| Greens | Karin Packer | 104 | 0.2 | +0.2 |
| Tasmania First | Peter Rettke | 621 | 1.1 | +1.1 |
| Tasmania First | Gavin Thompson | 552 | 1.0 | +1.0 |
| Tasmania First | Petita Abblitt | 349 | 0.6 | +0.6 |
| Tasmania First | Wally Weaver | 219 | 0.4 | +0.4 |
| Tasmania First | Gary Lane | 168 | 0.3 | +0.3 |
| Group E | Peter Stokes | 348 | 0.6 | +0.6 |
| Group E | Andrew Vanderfeen | 258 | 0.5 | −0.2 |
| Group B | Laurie Heathorn | 250 | 0.4 | +0.3 |
| Group B | John Mackenzie | 62 | 0.1 | 0.0 |
| Independent | Rodney Blenkhorn | 289 | 0.5 | +0.5 |
| Total formal votes | | 56,126 | 95.8 | +1.4 |
| Informal votes | | 2,456 | 4.2 | −1.4 |
| Turnout | | 58,582 | 96.1 | −0.4 |
Party total votes
| Labor | | 24,730 | 44.1 | +9.7 |
| Liberal | | 23,717 | 42.2 | −7.4 |
| Greens | | 4,563 | 8.2 | −0.9 |
| Tasmania First | | 1,909 | 3.4 | +3.4 |
| Group E | | 606 | 1.1 | +1.1 |
| Group B | | 312 | 0.6 | −0.7 |
| Independent | Rodney Blenkhorn | 289 | 0.5 | +0.5 |

==== 1996 ====
1996 Tasmanian state election: Braddon
| Party | Candidate | Votes | % | ±% |
|---|---|---|---|---|
| Quota | | 7,100 | | |
| Liberal | Bill Bonde (elected 2) | 7,379 | 13.0 | +2.0 |
| Liberal | Roger Groom (elected 3) | 6,298 | 11.1 | −11.5 |
| Liberal | Tony Rundle (elected 4) | 5,562 | 9.8 | −2.7 |
| Liberal | Ron Cornish (elected 5) | 4,131 | 7.3 | −2.8 |
| Liberal | Carole Cains | 3,505 | 6.2 | +1.4 |
| Liberal | Ray Baldock | 734 | 1.3 | +1.3 |
| Liberal | Michael Wickham | 570 | 1.0 | +1.0 |
| Labor | Michael Field (elected 1) | 7,955 | 14.0 | +1.5 |
| Labor | Bryan Green | 2,588 | 4.6 | +4.6 |
| Labor | Brenton Best (elected 6) | 2,493 | 4.4 | +4.4 |
| Labor | Yvonne Bird | 1,698 | 3.0 | +3.0 |
| Labor | Greg Richardson | 1,532 | 2.7 | +0.8 |
| Labor | Mike Gard | 1,477 | 2.6 | +2.6 |
| Labor | Jim Altimira | 1,262 | 2.2 | +1.3 |
| Labor | Sally Schnackenberg | 508 | 0.9 | +0.9 |
| Greens | Di Hollister (elected 7) | 4,561 | 8.0 | +0.4 |
| Greens | Paul O'Halloran | 146 | 0.3 | +0.3 |
| Greens | Faye Dixon | 129 | 0.2 | +0.2 |
| Greens | Jon Paice | 108 | 0.2 | −0.1 |
| Greens | Eddie Storace | 101 | 0.2 | +0.2 |
| Greens | Jo Kelly | 94 | 0.2 | +0.2 |
| Greens | John Wilson | 55 | 0.1 | +0.1 |
| National | Virginia Holmes | 910 | 1.6 | +1.6 |
| National | Steve Stevenson | 459 | 0.8 | +0.8 |
| National | Grant Goodwin | 424 | 0.7 | +0.7 |
| National | Geoff Leslie | 411 | 0.7 | +0.7 |
| National | George Lee | 205 | 0.4 | +0.4 |
| National | Henry Eiler | 86 | 0.2 | +0.2 |
| Group B | David Bissett | 644 | 1.1 | +1.1 |
| Group B | Laurie Heathorn | 83 | 0.1 | +0.1 |
| Independent | Andrew Vanderfeen | 395 | 0.7 | +0.7 |
| Extremely Greedy 40% | Martin Duffy | 128 | 0.2 | +0.2 |
| Extremely Greedy 40% | Patrick Carnuccio | 103 | 0.2 | +0.2 |
| Independent | John Mackenzie | 58 | 0.1 | +0.1 |
| Total formal votes | | 56,792 | 94.4 | −1.5 |
| Informal votes | | 3,380 | 5.6 | +1.5 |
| Turnout | | 60,172 | 96.5 | +0.8 |
Party total votes
| Liberal | | 28,179 | 49.6 | −16.1 |
| Labor | | 19,513 | 34.4 | +13.6 |
| Greens | | 5,194 | 9.1 | +0.3 |
| National | | 2,495 | 4.4 | +4.4 |
| Group B | | 727 | 1.3 | +1.3 |
| Independent | Andrew Vanderfeen | 395 | 0.7 | +0.7 |
| Extremely Greedy 40% | | 231 | 0.4 | +0.4 |
| Independent | John Mackenzie | 58 | 0.1 | +0.1 |

==== 1992 ====
1992 Tasmanian state election: Braddon
| Party | Candidate | Votes | % | ±% |
|---|---|---|---|---|
| Quota | | 7,129 | | |
| Liberal | Roger Groom (elected 1) | 12,886 | 22.6 | +4.5 |
| Liberal | Tony Rundle (elected 2) | 7,102 | 12.5 | 0.0 |
| Liberal | Bill Bonde (elected 4) | 6,286 | 11.0 | −1.2 |
| Liberal | Ron Cornish (elected 3) | 5,787 | 10.1 | +0.1 |
| Liberal | Carole Cains (elected 6) | 2,731 | 4.8 | +1.6 |
| Liberal | Gerald Heathcote | 1,571 | 2.8 | +2.8 |
| Liberal | Tony Van Rooyen | 1,105 | 1.9 | +1.9 |
| Labor | Michael Field (elected 5) | 7,128 | 12.5 | −3.1 |
| Labor | Michael Weldon | 1,573 | 2.8 | −2.7 |
| Labor | Sid Sidebottom | 1,095 | 1.9 | +1.9 |
| Labor | Greg Richardson | 1,077 | 1.9 | +1.9 |
| Labor | Jim Altimira | 520 | 0.9 | +0.9 |
| Labor | Neil McConnell | 260 | 0.5 | +0.5 |
| Labor | Colin Berry | 213 | 0.4 | +0.4 |
| Independent Greens | Di Hollister (elected 7) | 4,314 | 7.6 | −2.8 |
| Independent Greens | Jon Paice | 181 | 0.3 | +0.3 |
| Independent Greens | George Sanders | 144 | 0.3 | +0.3 |
| Independent Greens | Nicki Fletcher | 136 | 0.2 | +0.2 |
| Independent Greens | Peter Walford | 101 | 0.2 | −0.4 |
| Independent Greens | Richard Donaghey | 71 | 0.1 | +0.1 |
| Independent Greens | Ian Clare | 66 | 0.1 | +0.1 |
| Advance Tasmania | Gordon Ibbott | 706 | 1.2 | +1.2 |
| Advance Tasmania | Ken Last | 631 | 1.1 | +1.1 |
| Independent | Wayne Smith | 986 | 1.7 | +1.7 |
| Independent | Peter Rettke | 242 | 0.4 | +0.4 |
| Independent | Guy Coughlan | 113 | 0.2 | +0.2 |
| Total formal votes | | 57,025 | 95.9 | +1.1 |
| Informal votes | | 2,425 | 4.1 | −1.1 |
| Turnout | | 59,450 | 95.7 | +2.1 |
Party total votes
| Liberal | | 37,468 | 65.7 | +8.2 |
| Labor | | 11,866 | 20.8 | −9.1 |
| Independent Greens | | 5,013 | 8.8 | −2.7 |
| Advance Tasmania | | 1,337 | 2.3 | +2.3 |
| Independent | Wayne Smith | 986 | 1.7 | +1.7 |
| Independent | Peter Rettke | 242 | 0.4 | +0.4 |
| Independent | Guy Coughlan | 113 | 0.2 | +0.2 |

=== Elections in the 1980s ===
==== 1989 ====
1989 Tasmanian state election: Braddon
| Party | Candidate | Votes | % | ±% |
|---|---|---|---|---|
| Quota | | 6,817 | | |
| Liberal | Roger Groom (elected 1) | 9,881 | 18.1 | −0.7 |
| Liberal | Tony Rundle (elected 3) | 6,807 | 12.5 | +1.7 |
| Liberal | Ron Cornish (elected 4) | 5,437 | 10.0 | −1.0 |
| Liberal | Bill Bonde (elected 5) | 5,342 | 9.8 | +2.3 |
| Liberal | Carole Cains | 1,727 | 3.2 | +3.2 |
| Liberal | Heather Wall | 1,157 | 2.1 | +2.1 |
| Liberal | Ron Nankervis | 977 | 1.8 | +1.8 |
| Labor | Michael Field (elected 2) | 8,486 | 15.6 | +6.9 |
| Labor | Michael Weldon (elected 7) | 3,009 | 5.5 | −2.1 |
| Labor | Greg Peart | 2,520 | 4.6 | −4.7 |
| Labor | David Currie | 884 | 1.6 | +1.6 |
| Labor | Tom Eggleston | 775 | 1.4 | +1.4 |
| Labor | David Nettleton | 340 | 0.6 | +0.6 |
| Labor | Bruce Tivendale | 269 | 0.5 | +0.5 |
| Independent Greens | Di Hollister (elected 6) | 5,657 | 10.4 | +10.4 |
| Independent Greens | Peter Walford | 339 | 0.6 | +0.6 |
| Independent Greens | Arnold Rowlands | 267 | 0.5 | +0.5 |
| Independent | Lawrence Edwards | 322 | 0.6 | +0.6 |
| Independent | Ted Nielsen | 161 | 0.3 | +0.3 |
| Independent | Heather Benjamin | 117 | 0.2 | +0.2 |
| Independent | George Lee | 55 | 0.1 | +0.1 |
| Total formal votes | | 54,529 | 94.8 | 0.0 |
| Informal votes | | 3,017 | 5.2 | 0.0 |
| Turnout | | 57,546 | 93.6 | −1.2 |
Party total votes
| Liberal | | 31,328 | 57.5 | +2.6 |
| Labor | | 16,283 | 29.9 | −4.2 |
| Independent Greens | | 6,263 | 11.5 | +11.5 |
| Independent | Lawrence Edwards | 322 | 0.6 | +0.6 |
| Independent | Ted Nielsen | 161 | 0.3 | +0.3 |
| Independent | Heather Benjamin | 117 | 0.2 | +0.2 |
| Independent | George Lee | 55 | 0.1 | +0.1 |

==== 1986 ====
1986 Tasmanian state election: Braddon
| Party | Candidate | Votes | % | ±% |
|---|---|---|---|---|
| Quota | | 6,460 | | |
| Liberal | Roger Groom (elected 1) | 9,681 | 18.7 | +8.1 |
| Liberal | Ron Cornish (elected 2) | 5,684 | 11.0 | +0.8 |
| Liberal | Tony Rundle (elected 3) | 5,563 | 10.8 | +7.1 |
| Liberal | Bill Bonde (elected 7) | 3,868 | 7.5 | +7.5 |
| Liberal | Vince Smith | 3,030 | 5.9 | −0.6 |
| Liberal | Gerald O'Dea | 2,126 | 4.1 | +4.1 |
| Liberal | Carol Thomson | 1,123 | 2.2 | +2.2 |
| Labor | Greg Peart (elected 4) | 4,808 | 9.3 | +9.3 |
| Labor | Michael Field (elected 5) | 4,488 | 8.7 | −0.7 |
| Labor | Michael Weldon (elected 6) | 3,945 | 7.6 | +1.4 |
| Labor | John Coughlan | 2,170 | 4.2 | −6.2 |
| Labor | Glen Davies | 1,333 | 2.6 | −4.8 |
| Labor | Robin Lohrey | 499 | 1.0 | +1.0 |
| Labor | Marjorie Luck | 354 | 0.7 | +0.7 |
| Democrats | Greg Sergeant | 1,132 | 2.2 | +2.2 |
| Democrats | Kent Taylor | 877 | 1.7 | +1.7 |
| Independent | Les Woods | 992 | 1.9 | +1.9 |
| Total formal votes | | 51,673 | 94.8 | −0.2 |
| Informal votes | | 2,836 | 5.2 | +0.2 |
| Turnout | | 54,509 | 94.8 | +2.1 |
Party total votes
| Liberal | | 31,075 | 60.1 | +10.3 |
| Labor | | 17,597 | 34.1 | −7.2 |
| Democrats | | 2,009 | 3.9 | −0.1 |
| Independent | Les Woods | 992 | 1.9 | +1.9 |

==== 1982 ====
1982 Tasmanian state election: Braddon
| Party | Candidate | Votes | % | ±% |
|---|---|---|---|---|
| Quota | | 6,074 | | |
| Liberal | Ray Bonney (elected 1) | 7,069 | 14.5 | −1.9 |
| Liberal | Roger Groom (elected 2) | 5,174 | 10.6 | +2.5 |
| Liberal | Ron Cornish (elected 3) | 4,933 | 10.2 | +2.7 |
| Liberal | Vince Smith (elected 5) | 3,138 | 6.5 | +6.5 |
| Liberal | Tony Rundle | 1,808 | 3.7 | +3.7 |
| Liberal | Malcolm Fenton | 1,204 | 2.5 | +2.5 |
| Liberal | Barbara Lamberton | 849 | 1.7 | +1.7 |
| Labor | John Coughlan (elected 4) | 5,050 | 10.4 | −6.4 |
| Labor | Michael Field (elected 6) | 4,569 | 9.4 | −2.5 |
| Labor | Glen Davies (elected 7) | 3,577 | 7.4 | −2.5 |
| Labor | Michael Weldon | 3,011 | 6.2 | +0.9 |
| Labor | Steve Daley | 1,646 | 3.4 | +3.4 |
| Labor | Bruce Duhig | 1,179 | 2.4 | +2.4 |
| Labor | Peter Blizzard | 1,037 | 2.1 | +2.1 |
| Democrats | Margaret Duthoit | 739 | 1.5 | +1.5 |
| Democrats | Allan McDonald | 679 | 1.4 | +1.4 |
| Democrats | Gavin Bugg | 521 | 1.1 | +1.1 |
| Group D | Kerry Berwick | 914 | 1.9 | +1.9 |
| Group D | Ronald Machen | 647 | 1.3 | +1.3 |
| Group C | James Hay | 193 | 0.4 | +0.4 |
| Group C | Graham Gee | 146 | 0.3 | +0.3 |
| Independent | Terrence Reid | 315 | 0.6 | +0.6 |
| Independent | Michael Boylan | 136 | 0.3 | +0.3 |
| Independent | Ivan Walsh | 56 | 0.1 | +0.1 |
| Total formal votes | | 48,590 | 95.0 | −1.2 |
| Informal votes | | 2,579 | 5.0 | +1.2 |
| Turnout | | 51,169 | 92.7 | −0.4 |
Party total votes
| Liberal | | 24,175 | 49.8 | +7.1 |
| Labor | | 20,069 | 41.3 | −12.9 |
| Democrats | | 1,939 | 4.0 | +2.0 |
| Group D | | 1,561 | 3.2 | +3.2 |
| Group C | | 339 | 0.7 | +0.7 |
| Independent | Terrence Reid | 315 | 0.6 | +0.6 |
| Independent | Michael Boylan | 136 | 0.3 | +0.3 |
| Independent | Ivan Walsh | 56 | 0.1 | +0.1 |

=== Elections in the 1970s ===
==== 1979 ====
1979 Tasmanian state election: Braddon
| Party | Candidate | Votes | % | ±% |
|---|---|---|---|---|
| Quota | | 5,755 | | |
| Labor | John Coughlan (elected 1) | 7,731 | 16.8 | +6.7 |
| Labor | Michael Field (elected 3) | 5,481 | 11.9 | +4.8 |
| Labor | Glen Davies (elected 5) | 4,547 | 9.9 | −6.0 |
| Labor | Michael Weldon (elected 6) | 2,423 | 5.3 | +5.3 |
| Labor | Maurice Dart | 2,022 | 4.4 | +1.5 |
| Labor | Geoff Chisholm | 1,903 | 4.1 | −4.2 |
| Labor | Wendy Faulkes | 849 | 1.8 | +1.8 |
| Liberal | Ray Bonney (elected 2) | 7,548 | 16.4 | +3.5 |
| Liberal | Roger Groom (elected 4) | 3,752 | 8.1 | +1.4 |
| Liberal | Ron Cornish (elected 7) | 3,464 | 7.5 | −0.5 |
| Liberal | Tony Fletcher | 2,837 | 6.2 | +6.2 |
| Liberal | Terry Stuart | 787 | 1.7 | +1.7 |
| Liberal | Bill French | 699 | 1.5 | +1.5 |
| Liberal | Anne Gribbin | 584 | 1.3 | +1.3 |
| Democrats | Lynton Viant | 783 | 1.7 | +1.7 |
| Democrats | Des Kynaston | 134 | 0.3 | +0.3 |
| Independent | Ted Vickers | 465 | 1.0 | +1.0 |
| Independent | Philip Treagus | 30 | 0.1 | +0.1 |
| Total formal votes | | 46,039 | 96.2 | −0.4 |
| Informal votes | | 1,806 | 3.8 | +0.4 |
| Turnout | | 47,845 | 93.1 | −1.2 |
Party total votes
| Labor | | 24,956 | 54.2 | +0.3 |
| Liberal | | 19,671 | 42.7 | −3.2 |
| Democrats | | 917 | 2.0 | +2.0 |
| Independent | Ted Vickers | 465 | 1.0 | +1.0 |
| Independent | Philip Treagus | 30 | 0.1 | +0.1 |

==== 1976 ====
1976 Tasmanian state election: Braddon
| Party | Candidate | Votes | % | ±% |
|---|---|---|---|---|
| Quota | | 6,247 | | |
| Labor | Glen Davies (elected 1) | 7,953 | 15.9 | +9.3 |
| Labor | John Coughlan (elected 3) | 5,057 | 10.1 | +7.8 |
| Labor | Geoff Chisholm (elected 4) | 4,090 | 8.2 | +3.3 |
| Labor | Michael Field (elected 5) | 3,565 | 7.1 | +7.1 |
| Labor | Ted Vickers | 2,837 | 5.7 | +5.7 |
| Labor | Maurice Dart | 1,443 | 2.9 | +2.9 |
| Labor | Graeme Smith | 1,053 | 2.1 | +2.1 |
| Labor | Christopher Wright | 924 | 1.8 | +1.8 |
| Liberal | Ray Bonney (elected 2) | 6,438 | 12.9 | +1.7 |
| Liberal | Ron Cornish (elected 6) | 4,000 | 8.0 | +8.0 |
| Liberal | Roger Groom (elected 7) | 3,334 | 6.7 | +6.7 |
| Liberal | Eric Bessell | 2,777 | 5.6 | +5.6 |
| Liberal | Kent Furmage | 2,138 | 4.3 | +4.3 |
| Liberal | Frank Atkins | 1,831 | 3.7 | +3.7 |
| Liberal | Harold Hawkes | 1,439 | 2.9 | +2.9 |
| Liberal | Harold Dowling | 963 | 1.9 | +1.9 |
| Independent | Philip Kelly | 128 | 0.3 | +0.3 |
| Total formal votes | | 49,970 | 96.6 | −0.2 |
| Informal votes | | 1,766 | 3.4 | +0.2 |
| Turnout | | 51,736 | 94.3 | −0.2 |
Party total votes
| Labor | | 26,922 | 53.9 | −9.0 |
| Liberal | | 22,920 | 45.9 | +12.1 |
| Independent | Philip Kelly | 128 | 0.3 | +0.3 |

==== 1972 ====
1972 Tasmanian state election: Braddon
| Party | Candidate | Votes | % | ±% |
|---|---|---|---|---|
| Quota | | 5,223 | | |
| Labor | Eric Reece (elected 1) | 14,790 | 35.4 | +1.2 |
| Labor | Lloyd Costello (elected 3) | 2,814 | 6.7 | +1.4 |
| Labor | Glen Davies (elected 2) | 2,767 | 6.6 | +6.6 |
| Labor | Geoff Chisholm (elected 5) | 2,042 | 4.9 | +1.2 |
| Labor | Sydney Ward (elected 6) | 1,548 | 3.7 | +0.1 |
| Labor | Joseph Britton | 1,138 | 2.7 | −0.8 |
| Labor | John Coughlan | 969 | 2.3 | +2.3 |
| Labor | Josephus Hen | 225 | 0.5 | +0.5 |
| Liberal | Ray Bonney (elected 4) | 4,662 | 11.2 | +11.2 |
| Liberal | Wilfred Barker (elected 7) | 2,839 | 6.8 | −3.6 |
| Liberal | Brian Archer | 2,460 | 5.9 | +5.9 |
| Liberal | Jack Breheny | 2,086 | 5.0 | −1.5 |
| Liberal | John Davis | 1,231 | 2.9 | +0.4 |
| Liberal | Thomas Gardner | 762 | 1.8 | +1.8 |
| Liberal | Leslie Woods | 100 | 0.2 | +0.2 |
| United Tasmania | Noreen Batchelor | 893 | 2.1 | +2.1 |
| United Tasmania | Anthony Weston | 224 | 0.5 | +0.5 |
| Independent | Alexander Best | 132 | 0.3 | +0.3 |
| Independent | John Chapman-Mortimer | 96 | 0.2 | +0.2 |
| Total formal votes | | 41,778 | 96.8 | +1.0 |
| Informal votes | | 1,381 | 3.2 | −1.0 |
| Turnout | | 43,159 | 94.5 | −0.2 |
Party total votes
| Labor | | 26,293 | 62.9 | +9.2 |
| Liberal | | 14,140 | 33.8 | −0.6 |
| United Tasmania | | 1,117 | 2.7 | +2.7 |
| Independent | Alexander Best | 132 | 0.3 | +0.3 |
| Independent | John Chapman-Mortimer | 96 | 0.2 | +0.2 |

=== Elections in the 1960s ===
==== 1969 ====
1969 Tasmanian state election: Braddon
| Party | Candidate | Votes | % | ±% |
|---|---|---|---|---|
| Quota | | 4,921 | | |
| Labor | Eric Reece (elected 1) | 13,452 | 34.2 | −0.5 |
| Labor | Lloyd Costello (elected 3) | 2,104 | 5.3 | −0.9 |
| Labor | Geoff Chisholm (elected 5) | 1,476 | 3.7 | −0.6 |
| Labor | Sydney Ward (elected 4) | 1,399 | 3.6 | −1.0 |
| Labor | Joseph Britton | 1,386 | 3.5 | +1.6 |
| Labor | Donald Crowe | 600 | 1.5 | +1.5 |
| Labor | Jack Crawford | 432 | 1.1 | +1.1 |
| Labor | Gordon O'Shannessey | 304 | 0.8 | −0.6 |
| Liberal | Wilfred Barker (elected 2) | 4,087 | 10.4 | +4.5 |
| Liberal | William Young | 2,619 | 6.7 | +0.7 |
| Liberal | Jack Breheny (elected 7) | 2,555 | 6.5 | −0.7 |
| Liberal | Alan Moore | 1,691 | 4.3 | +4.3 |
| Liberal | John Davis | 999 | 2.5 | +2.5 |
| Liberal | Ray Grey | 960 | 2.4 | +1.0 |
| Liberal | Bruce Walker | 633 | 1.6 | +1.6 |
| Centre | Kevin Lyons (elected 6) | 3,546 | 9.0 | +9.0 |
| Centre | Lawrence Ling | 252 | 0.6 | +0.6 |
| Centre | Laurie Heathorn | 242 | 0.6 | +0.6 |
| Centre | Lloyd Hodgkinson | 75 | 0.2 | +0.2 |
| Democratic Labor | John Chapman-Mortimer | 443 | 1.1 | +0.8 |
| Democratic Labor | Dudley McNamara | 106 | 0.3 | +0.3 |
| Total formal votes | | 39,361 | 95.8 | −0.8 |
| Informal votes | | 1,730 | 4.2 | +0.8 |
| Turnout | | 41,091 | 94.7 | −0.9 |
Party total votes
| Labor | | 21,153 | 53.7 | −2.9 |
| Liberal | | 13,544 | 34.4 | +1.5 |
| Centre | | 4,115 | 10.5 | +10.5 |
| Democratic Labor | | 549 | 1.4 | −0.9 |

==== 1964 ====
1964 Tasmanian state election: Braddon
| Party | Candidate | Votes | % | ±% |
|---|---|---|---|---|
| Quota | | 4,428 | | |
| Labor | Eric Reece (elected 1) | 12,291 | 34.7 | +4.3 |
| Labor | Lloyd Costello (elected 3) | 2,184 | 6.2 | +0.7 |
| Labor | Sydney Ward (elected 2) | 1,807 | 5.1 | −2.8 |
| Labor | Geoff Chisholm (elected 4) | 1,528 | 4.3 | +4.3 |
| Labor | Douglas Blacklow | 761 | 2.1 | +2.1 |
| Labor | Joseph Britton | 674 | 1.9 | −1.4 |
| Labor | Gordon O'Shannessey | 483 | 1.4 | +1.4 |
| Labor | Richard Sleath | 304 | 0.9 | +0.9 |
| Liberal | Kevin Lyons (elected 5) | 2,958 | 8.4 | −1.3 |
| Liberal | Jack Breheny (elected 7) | 2,565 | 7.2 | −2.4 |
| Liberal | William Young | 2,117 | 6.0 | −0.7 |
| Liberal | Wilfred Barker (elected 6) | 2,087 | 5.9 | +5.9 |
| Liberal | John Leary | 609 | 1.7 | +1.7 |
| Liberal | Ray Grey | 504 | 1.4 | +1.4 |
| Liberal | Ernest Johnson | 372 | 1.1 | +1.1 |
| Liberal | Loch Roberts | 332 | 0.9 | +0.9 |
| Liberal | Charles MacKenzie | 124 | 0.4 | +0.4 |
| Country | Roger Chalk | 769 | 2.2 | +2.2 |
| Country | Anthony Hine | 570 | 1.6 | +1.6 |
| Country | Eric Webster | 472 | 1.3 | +1.3 |
| Country | Elliott Hooper | 399 | 1.1 | +1.1 |
| Country | Thomas Barnard | 370 | 1.0 | +1.0 |
| Country | Gilbert Allen | 341 | 1.0 | +1.0 |
| Democratic Labor | Ronald Cole | 660 | 1.9 | +1.9 |
| Democratic Labor | John Mortimer | 99 | 0.3 | +0.3 |
| Democratic Labor | Abraham Neut | 38 | 0.1 | +0.1 |
| Total formal votes | | 35,418 | 96.6 | +1.5 |
| Informal votes | | 1,248 | 3.4 | −1.5 |
| Turnout | | 36,666 | 95.6 | +1.4 |
Party total votes
| Labor | | 20,032 | 56.6 | +4.4 |
| Liberal | | 11,668 | 32.9 | −9.5 |
| Country | | 2,921 | 8.2 | +8.2 |
| Democratic Labor | | 797 | 2.3 | −2.7 |

=== Elections in the 1950s ===
==== 1959 ====
1959 Tasmanian state election: Braddon
| Party | Candidate | Votes | % | ±% |
|---|---|---|---|---|
| Quota | | 3,983 | | |
| Labor | Eric Reece (elected 1) | 9,688 | 30.4 | +11.4 |
| Labor | Sydney Ward (elected 2) | 2,511 | 7.9 | −4.2 |
| Labor | Lloyd Costello (elected 4) | 1,756 | 5.5 | +5.5 |
| Labor | Joseph Britton (elected 5) | 1,067 | 3.3 | +3.3 |
| Labor | Aubrey Gaffney | 582 | 1.8 | +1.8 |
| Labor | Patrick Streets | 541 | 1.7 | +1.7 |
| Labor | Harold Singleton | 472 | 1.5 | +1.5 |
| Liberal | Kevin Lyons (elected 7) | 3,084 | 9.7 | +0.6 |
| Liberal | Jack Breheny (elected 6) | 3,071 | 9.6 | +2.0 |
| Liberal | Carrol Bramich (elected 3) | 2,588 | 8.1 | −9.2 |
| Liberal | William Young | 2,134 | 6.7 | +6.7 |
| Liberal | Horace Lane | 1,125 | 3.5 | +3.5 |
| Liberal | Arthur Abel | 932 | 2.9 | +2.9 |
| Liberal | Charles Rand | 579 | 1.8 | +1.8 |
| Democratic Labor | Frances Lane | 750 | 2.4 | +2.4 |
| Democratic Labor | Bruce Cameron | 742 | 2.3 | +2.3 |
| Democratic Labor | Alban Galpin | 102 | 0.3 | −0.1 |
| Independent | Eric Nicholls | 133 | 0.4 | +0.4 |
| Total formal votes | | 31,857 | 95.1 | −1.5 |
| Informal votes | | 1,654 | 4.9 | +1.5 |
| Turnout | | 33,511 | 94.2 | −1.1 |
Party total votes
| Labor | | 16,617 | 52.2 | +3.7 |
| Liberal | | 13,513 | 42.4 | −4.5 |
| Democratic Labor | | 1,594 | 5.0 | +0.8 |
| Independent | Eric Nicholls | 133 | 0.4 | +0.4 |

==== 1956 ====
1956 Tasmanian state election: Braddon
| Party | Candidate | Votes | % | ±% |
|---|---|---|---|---|
| Quota | | 4,510 | | |
| Labor | Eric Reece (elected 1) | 5,983 | 19.0 | −2.0 |
| Labor | Sydney Ward (elected 3) | 3,805 | 12.1 | +5.7 |
| Labor | Charley Aylett (elected 4) | 2,673 | 8.5 | −1.5 |
| Labor | Frank Taylor | 1,641 | 5.2 | +5.2 |
| Labor | Cyril Cameron | 613 | 1.9 | +1.9 |
| Labor | John Keating | 587 | 1.9 | +1.9 |
| Liberal | Carrol Bramich (elected 2) | 5,467 | 17.3 | +17.3 |
| Liberal | Kevin Lyons (elected 5) | 2,882 | 9.1 | −1.4 |
| Liberal | John Fidler | 2,461 | 7.8 | −3.4 |
| Liberal | Jack Breheny (elected 6) | 2,409 | 7.6 | −5.5 |
| Liberal | Edward Gaby | 919 | 2.9 | −1.7 |
| Liberal | Trevor Frampton | 676 | 2.1 | −2.2 |
| Labor (A-C) | Terence Doody | 638 | 2.0 | +2.0 |
| Labor (A-C) | Timothy Healy | 538 | 1.7 | +1.7 |
| Labor (A-C) | Albin Galpin | 134 | 0.4 | +0.4 |
| Independent | Roger Miller | 139 | 0.4 | +0.4 |
| Total formal votes | | 31,565 | 96.6 | −0.2 |
| Informal votes | | 1,115 | 3.4 | +0.2 |
| Turnout | | 32,680 | 95.3 | −1.5 |
Party total votes
| Labor | | 15,302 | 48.5 | −4.8 |
| Liberal | | 14,814 | 46.9 | +0.2 |
| Labor (A-C) | | 1,310 | 4.2 | +4.2 |
| Independent | Roger Miller | 139 | 0.4 | +0.4 |

==== 1955 ====
1955 Tasmanian state election: Darwin
| Party | Candidate | Votes | % | ±% |
|---|---|---|---|---|
| Quota | | 4,412 | | |
| Labor | Eric Reece (elected 1) | 6,484 | 21.0 | +2.9 |
| Labor | Charley Aylett (elected 3) | 3,072 | 9.9 | −3.2 |
| Labor | Carrol Bramich (elected 6) | 2,372 | 7.7 | +0.5 |
| Labor | Sydney Ward | 1,979 | 6.4 | +6.4 |
| Labor | Raymond Durkin | 1,808 | 5.9 | +5.9 |
| Labor | Sydney Richardson | 755 | 2.4 | +2.4 |
| Liberal | Jack Breheny (elected 2) | 4,024 | 13.0 | +4.2 |
| Liberal | John Fidler (elected 3) | 3,467 | 11.2 | +2.0 |
| Liberal | Kevin Lyons (elected 4) | 3,237 | 10.5 | +1.5 |
| Liberal | Edward Gaby | 1,432 | 4.6 | +4.6 |
| Liberal | Trevor Frampton | 1,340 | 4.3 | +4.3 |
| Liberal | Horace Lane | 912 | 3.0 | +3.0 |
| Total formal votes | | 30,882 | 96.8 | +0.6 |
| Informal votes | | 1,028 | 3.2 | −0.6 |
| Turnout | | 31,910 | 93.7 | −1.0 |
Party total votes
| Labor | | 16,470 | 53.3 | +6.5 |
| Liberal | | 14,412 | 46.7 | −5.7 |

==== 1950 ====
1950 Tasmanian state election: Darwin
| Party | Candidate | Votes | % | ±% |
|---|---|---|---|---|
| Quota | | 4,011 | | |
| Liberal | Jack Chamberlain (elected 2) | 4,139 | 14.7 | +2.1 |
| Liberal | John Fidler (elected 5) | 2,580 | 9.2 | +1.2 |
| Liberal | Kevin Lyons (elected 6) | 2,526 | 9.0 | +3.6 |
| Liberal | Jack Breheny | 2,461 | 8.8 | +8.8 |
| Liberal | Raymond Powys | 1,352 | 4.8 | +4.8 |
| Liberal | Hector McFie | 1,132 | 4.0 | +4.0 |
| Liberal | Mervyn Langham | 512 | 1.8 | +1.8 |
| Labor | Eric Reece (elected 1) | 5,076 | 18.1 | +0.1 |
| Labor | Charley Aylett (elected 3) | 4,018 | 14.3 | +0.6 |
| Labor | Carrol Bramich (elected 4) | 2,017 | 7.2 | +1.1 |
| Labor | Edward Beachcroft | 1,100 | 3.9 | +3.9 |
| Labor | Gordon O'Shannessey | 704 | 2.5 | +2.5 |
| Labor | Patrick Streets | 554 | 2.0 | +2.0 |
| Independent | Thomas Cornelius | 240 | 0.9 | +0.9 |
| Total formal votes | | 28,070 | 96.2 | +0.7 |
| Informal votes | | 1,115 | 3.8 | −0.7 |
| Turnout | | 29,185 | 94.7 | +0.1 |
Party total votes
| Liberal | | 14,702 | 52.4 | +6.7 |
| Labor | | 13,128 | 46.8 | −0.9 |
| Independent | Thomas Cornelius | 240 | 0.9 | +0.9 |

=== Elections in the 1940s ===
==== 1948 ====
1948 Tasmanian state election: Darwin
| Party | Candidate | Votes | % | ±% |
|---|---|---|---|---|
| Quota | | 4,182 | | |
| Labor | Eric Reece (elected 1) | 5,255 | 18.0 | +2.9 |
| Labor | Charley Aylett (elected 2) | 4,018 | 13.7 | +1.4 |
| Labor | Carrol Bramich (elected 5) | 1,784 | 6.1 | +1.9 |
| Labor | Aubrey Bartram | 1,488 | 5.1 | +5.1 |
| Labor | Michael Smith | 777 | 2.7 | −1.6 |
| Labor | Harold Purton | 646 | 2.2 | +2.2 |
| Liberal | Jack Chamberlain (elected 3) | 3,684 | 12.6 | −0.2 |
| Liberal | John Fidler (elected 4) | 2,350 | 8.0 | −3.0 |
| Liberal | Gerald Acheson | 2,044 | 7.0 | +0.9 |
| Liberal | Kevin Lyons (elected 6) | 1,567 | 5.4 | +5.4 |
| Liberal | Percy Williams | 1,361 | 4.6 | +0.8 |
| Liberal | James Hilder | 939 | 3.2 | +3.2 |
| Liberal | Vivian Byard | 927 | 3.2 | +3.2 |
| Liberal | Wilfred French | 505 | 1.7 | +1.7 |
| Independent | Henry McFie | 1,498 | 5.1 | +5.1 |
| Independent | Leslie Margetts | 274 | 0.9 | +0.9 |
| Independent | Ellis Batten | 155 | 0.5 | +0.5 |
| Total formal votes | | 29,272 | 95.5 | +3.5 |
| Informal votes | | 1,382 | 4.5 | −3.5 |
| Turnout | | 30,654 | 94.6 | +4.5 |
Party total votes
| Labor | | 13,968 | 47.7 | −1.8 |
| Liberal | | 13,377 | 45.7 | −2.0 |
| Independent | | 1,927 | 6.6 | +6.6 |

==== 1946 ====
1946 Tasmanian state election: Darwin
| Party | Candidate | Votes | % | ±% |
|---|---|---|---|---|
| Quota | | 3,905 | | |
| Labor | Eric Reece (elected 1) | 4,116 | 15.1 | +15.1 |
| Labor | Charley Aylett (elected 3) | 3,368 | 12.3 | +12.3 |
| Labor | Michael Smith | 1,164 | 4.3 | +2.2 |
| Labor | Carrol Bramich (elected 6) | 1,152 | 4.2 | +4.2 |
| Labor | Bert Lacey | 1,127 | 4.1 | +4.1 |
| Labor | James Bugg | 1,070 | 3.9 | −2.9 |
| Labor | Philip Kelly | 421 | 1.5 | −3.7 |
| Liberal | Jack Chamberlain (elected 2) | 3,510 | 12.8 | −0.1 |
| Liberal | John Fidler (elected 4) | 3,011 | 11.0 | +11.0 |
| Liberal | Henry McFie (elected 5) | 2,591 | 9.5 | +3.1 |
| Liberal | Gerald Acheson | 1,664 | 6.1 | +1.3 |
| Liberal | Bernard Roberts | 1,207 | 4.4 | +4.4 |
| Liberal | Percy Williams | 1,042 | 3.8 | +3.8 |
| Independent | Leslie Margetts | 786 | 2.9 | +2.9 |
| Total formal votes | | 27,333 | 92.0 | −3.3 |
| Informal votes | | 2,365 | 8.0 | +3.3 |
| Turnout | | 29,698 | 90.1 | −0.4 |
Party total votes
| Labor | | 13,522 | 49.5 | −9.0 |
| Liberal | | 13,025 | 47.7 | +6.2 |
| Independent | Leslie Margetts | 786 | 2.9 | +2.9 |

==== 1941 ====
1941 Tasmanian state election: Darwin
| Party | Candidate | Votes | % | ±% |
|---|---|---|---|---|
| Quota | | 3,616 | | |
| Labor | Thomas d'Alton (elected 1) | 10,380 | 41.0 | +10.3 |
| Labor | James Bugg (elected 3) | 1,728 | 6.8 | +6.8 |
| Labor | Philip Kelly (elected 2) | 1,320 | 5.2 | −3.3 |
| Labor | Henry Lane (elected 5) | 862 | 3.4 | 0.0 |
| Labor | Michael Smith | 525 | 2.1 | +2.1 |
| Nationalist | Jack Chamberlain (elected 4) | 3,267 | 12.9 | +4.8 |
| Nationalist | Henry McFie (elected 6) | 1,622 | 6.4 | +0.4 |
| Nationalist | John Wright | 1,561 | 6.2 | −1.2 |
| Nationalist | Gerald Acheson | 1,207 | 4.8 | +4.8 |
| Nationalist | Norman Booth | 1,107 | 4.4 | +4.4 |
| Nationalist | Russell Green | 1,062 | 4.2 | +4.2 |
| Nationalist | Stephen Broad | 669 | 2.6 | −0.6 |
| Total formal votes | | 25,310 | 95.3 | −2.1 |
| Informal votes | | 1,250 | 4.7 | +2.1 |
| Turnout | | 26,560 | 90.5 | −3.3 |
Party total votes
| Labor | | 14,815 | 58.5 | +1.1 |
| Nationalist | | 10,495 | 41.5 | −0.5 |

=== Elections in the 1930s ===
==== 1937 ====
1937 Tasmanian state election: Darwin
| Party | Candidate | Votes | % | ±% |
|---|---|---|---|---|
| Quota | | 3,527 | | |
| Labor | Thomas d'Alton (elected 1) | 7,576 | 30.7 | +15.7 |
| Labor | Philip Kelly (elected 2) | 2,086 | 8.5 | −2.6 |
| Labor | Joseph McGrath (elected 3) | 1,659 | 6.7 | +0.9 |
| Labor | Bill Aylett | 1,317 | 5.3 | +5.3 |
| Labor | Henry Lane | 830 | 3.4 | −0.6 |
| Labor | Garnet Cooper | 711 | 2.9 | +2.9 |
| Nationalist | Frank Edwards (elected 5) | 2,030 | 8.2 | +1.3 |
| Nationalist | Jack Chamberlain (elected 4) | 1,994 | 8.1 | +1.5 |
| Nationalist | Frank Marriott (elected 6) | 1,929 | 7.8 | −0.1 |
| Nationalist | John Wright | 1,827 | 7.4 | +1.1 |
| Nationalist | Henry McFie | 1,482 | 6.0 | +0.7 |
| Nationalist | Stephen Broad | 798 | 3.2 | +3.2 |
| Nationalist | Hubert Nichols | 317 | 1.3 | +1.3 |
| Independent | James Campbell | 128 | 0.5 | +0.5 |
| Total formal votes | | 24,684 | 97.1 | +0.1 |
| Informal votes | | 725 | 2.9 | −0.1 |
| Turnout | | 25,409 | 94.1 | +0.1 |
Party total votes
| Labor | | 14,179 | 57.4 | +16.6 |
| Nationalist | | 10,377 | 42.0 | −10.8 |
| Independent | James Campbell | 128 | 0.5 | +0.5 |

==== 1934 ====
1934 Tasmanian state election: Darwin
| Party | Candidate | Votes | % | ±% |
|---|---|---|---|---|
| Quota | | 3,403 | | |
| Nationalist | Frank Marriott (elected 3) | 1,878 | 7.9 | −4.4 |
| Nationalist | Frank Edwards (elected 5) | 1,648 | 6.9 | +6.9 |
| Nationalist | Jack Chamberlain (elected 4) | 1,564 | 6.6 | +6.6 |
| Nationalist | John Wright | 1,491 | 6.3 | +1.1 |
| Nationalist | Henry McFie | 1,259 | 5.3 | −3.3 |
| Nationalist | Thomas Butler | 1,008 | 4.2 | −21.5 |
| Nationalist | John Astell | 865 | 3.6 | +3.6 |
| Nationalist | Robert Hamilton | 851 | 3.6 | +3.6 |
| Nationalist | Ernest Fenton | 769 | 3.2 | +3.2 |
| Nationalist | Cyril Horne | 767 | 3.2 | +3.2 |
| Nationalist | Edward Hobbs | 478 | 2.0 | −5.3 |
| Labor | Thomas d'Alton (elected 1) | 3,561 | 15.0 | +3.3 |
| Labor | Philip Kelly (elected 2) | 2,649 | 11.1 | +1.5 |
| Labor | Joseph McGrath (elected 6) | 1,382 | 5.8 | +4.1 |
| Labor | James Belton | 1,181 | 5.0 | −1.7 |
| Labor | Henry Lane | 956 | 4.0 | +4.0 |
| Independent | Stephen Broad | 1,512 | 6.3 | +6.3 |
| Total formal votes | | 23,819 | 97.0 | +0.3 |
| Informal votes | | 725 | 3.0 | −0.3 |
| Turnout | | 24,544 | 94.0 | −1.2 |
Party total votes
| Nationalist | | 12,578 | 52.8 | −7.2 |
| Labor | | 9,729 | 40.8 | +9.4 |
| Independent | Stephen Broad | 1,512 | 6.3 | +6.3 |

==== 1931 ====
1931 Tasmanian state election: Darwin
| Party | Candidate | Votes | % | ±% |
|---|---|---|---|---|
| Quota | | 3,248 | | |
| Nationalist | Thomas Butler (elected 1) | 5,846 | 25.7 | +25.7 |
| Nationalist | Frank Marriott (elected 2) | 2,788 | 12.3 | −5.1 |
| Nationalist | Henry McFie (elected 6) | 1,953 | 8.6 | −0.5 |
| Nationalist | Edward Hobbs (elected 5) | 1,659 | 7.3 | −3.6 |
| Nationalist | John Wright | 1,180 | 5.2 | +5.2 |
| Nationalist | Colin Paul | 225 | 1.0 | +1.0 |
| Labor | Thomas d'Alton (elected 3) | 2,660 | 11.7 | +11.7 |
| Labor | Philip Kelly (elected 4) | 2,186 | 9.6 | −5.4 |
| Labor | James Belton | 1,523 | 6.7 | −6.5 |
| Labor | Joseph McGrath | 392 | 1.7 | +1.7 |
| Labor | James Gray | 378 | 1.7 | +1.7 |
| Independent | Fergus Medwin | 1,667 | 7.3 | +7.3 |
| Independent | Daniel Brown | 274 | 1.2 | +1.2 |
| Total formal votes | | 22,731 | 96.7 | −0.1 |
| Informal votes | | 768 | 3.3 | +0.1 |
| Turnout | | 23,499 | 95.2 | +11.0 |
Party total votes
| Nationalist | | 13,651 | 60.0 | +14.3 |
| Labor | | 7,139 | 31.4 | −15.3 |
| Independent | Fergus Medwin | 1,667 | 7.3 | +7.3 |
| Independent | Daniel Brown | 274 | 1.2 | +1.2 |

=== Elections in the 1920s ===
==== 1928 ====
1928 Tasmanian state election: Darwin
| Party | Candidate | Votes | % | ±% |
|---|---|---|---|---|
| Quota | | 2,678 | | |
| Labor | Philip Kelly (elected 2) | 2,805 | 15.0 | −16.3 |
| Labor | James Belton (elected 3) | 2,477 | 13.2 | −4.4 |
| Labor | Fergus Medwin (elected 6) | 1,171 | 6.2 | +6.2 |
| Labor | Henry Lane | 954 | 5.1 | +0.2 |
| Labor | Robert Steel | 677 | 3.6 | +3.6 |
| Labor | John O'Donnell | 674 | 3.6 | +3.6 |
| Nationalist | Frank Marriott (elected 1) | 3,266 | 17.4 | +5.7 |
| Nationalist | Edward Hobbs (elected 4) | 2,041 | 10.9 | +2.3 |
| Nationalist | Henry McFie (elected 5) | 1,703 | 9.1 | −0.5 |
| Nationalist | Richard Parsons | 785 | 4.2 | +4.2 |
| Nationalist | Duncan McInnes | 779 | 4.2 | +4.2 |
| Independent | Joshua Whitsitt | 1,413 | 7.5 | +7.5 |
| Total formal votes | | 18,745 | 96.8 | −0.7 |
| Informal votes | | 628 | 3.2 | +0.7 |
| Turnout | | 19,373 | 84.2 | +13.7 |
Party total votes
| Labor | | 8,758 | 46.7 | +4.8 |
| Nationalist | | 8,574 | 45.7 | +10.1 |
| Independent | Joshua Whitsitt | 1,413 | 7.5 | +7.5 |

==== 1925 ====
1925 Tasmanian state election: Darwin
| Party | Candidate | Votes | % | ±% |
|---|---|---|---|---|
| Quota | | 2,261 | | |
| Labor | James Belton (elected 1) | 2,790 | 17.6 | +6.9 |
| Labor | Philip Kelly (elected 2) | 2,585 | 16.3 | +9.4 |
| Labor | James Hurst (elected 4) | 1,354 | 8.6 | +1.3 |
| Labor | Henry Lane | 780 | 4.9 | +4.9 |
| Labor | Eliza Burnell | 348 | 2.2 | +2.2 |
| Labor | William Treanor | 291 | 1.8 | +1.8 |
| Nationalist | Frank Marriott (elected 3) | 1,856 | 11.7 | +2.7 |
| Nationalist | Henry McFie (elected 6) | 1,367 | 8.6 | +8.6 |
| Nationalist | Hubert Nichols | 1,059 | 6.7 | +6.7 |
| Nationalist | Herbert Vertigan | 565 | 3.6 | +3.6 |
| Nationalist | Harold Ireland | 396 | 2.5 | +2.5 |
| Nationalist | David Jones | 383 | 2.4 | +2.4 |
| Liberal | Edward Hobbs (elected 5) | 1,366 | 8.6 | 0.0 |
| Liberal | James Charleston | 684 | 4.3 | +4.3 |
| Total formal votes | | 15,824 | 97.5 | +0.1 |
| Informal votes | | 408 | 2.5 | −0.1 |
| Turnout | | 16,232 | 70.5 | +7.5 |
Party total votes
| Labor | | 8,148 | 51.5 | +8.0 |
| Nationalist | | 5,626 | 35.6 | +7.0 |
| Liberal | | 2,050 | 13.0 | +13.0 |

==== 1922 ====
1922 Tasmanian state election: Darwin
| Party | Candidate | Votes | % | ±% |
|---|---|---|---|---|
| Quota | | 1,535 | | |
| Labor | James Ogden (elected 1) | 2,004 | 18.7 | +3.7 |
| Labor | James Belton (elected 2) | 1,149 | 10.7 | −1.4 |
| Labor | James Hurst (elected 6) | 787 | 7.3 | −3.2 |
| Labor | Philip Kelly | 736 | 6.9 | +6.9 |
| Country | Edward Hobbs (elected 5) | 919 | 8.6 | +8.6 |
| Country | Richard Franks (elected 3) | 882 | 8.2 | +8.2 |
| Country | Charles Dunning | 682 | 6.3 | +6.3 |
| Country | John Wright | 592 | 5.5 | +5.5 |
| Nationalist | Frank Marriott (elected 4) | 967 | 9.0 | +9.0 |
| Nationalist | Percy Pollard | 950 | 8.8 | −2.9 |
| Independent | Joshua Whitsitt | 962 | 9.0 | −6.3 |
| Independent | Llewellyn Storey | 109 | 1.0 | +1.0 |
| Total formal votes | | 10,739 | 97.4 | +2.2 |
| Informal votes | | 282 | 2.6 | −2.2 |
| Turnout | | 11,021 | 63.0 | −4.9 |
Party total votes
| Labor | | 4,676 | 43.5 | −4.0 |
| Country | | 3,075 | 28.6 | +28.6 |
| Nationalist | | 1,917 | 17.9 | −19.3 |
| Independent | Joshua Whitsitt | 962 | 9.0 | −6.3 |
| Independent | Llewellyn Storey | 109 | 1.0 | +1.0 |

=== Elections in the 1910s ===
==== 1919 ====
1919 Tasmanian state election: Darwin
| Party | Candidate | Votes | % | ±% |
|---|---|---|---|---|
| Quota | | 1,718 | | |
| Labor | James Ogden (elected 2) | 1,805 | 15.0 | −1.4 |
| Labor | James Belton (elected 4) | 1,450 | 12.1 | −7.2 |
| Labor | James Hurst (elected 5) | 1,268 | 10.5 | +10.5 |
| Labor | George Phillips | 531 | 4.4 | +4.4 |
| Labor | Leonard Bennett | 521 | 4.3 | −2.9 |
| Labor | Leonard Burrows | 130 | 1.1 | +1.1 |
| Nationalist | Edward Hobbs (elected 3) | 1,751 | 14.6 | +3.1 |
| Nationalist | Herbert Payne (elected 6) | 1,464 | 12.2 | +0.6 |
| Nationalist | Percy Pollard | 1,260 | 9.3 | +9.3 |
| Independent | Joshua Whitsitt (elected 1) | 1,841 | 15.3 | +4.7 |
| Total formal votes | | 12,021 | 95.2 | +1.5 |
| Informal votes | | 604 | 4.8 | −1.5 |
| Turnout | | 12,625 | 67.9 | −6.0 |
Party total votes
| Labor | | 5,705 | 47.5 | −3.2 |
| Nationalist | | 4,475 | 37.2 | −1.5 |
| Independent | Joshua Whitsitt | 1,841 | 15.3 | +4.7 |

==== 1916 ====
1916 Tasmanian state election: Darwin
| Party | Candidate | Votes | % | ±% |
|---|---|---|---|---|
| Quota | | 1,928 | | |
| Labor | James Belton (elected 1) | 2,601 | 19.3 | +5.5 |
| Labor | James Ogden (elected 2) | 2,216 | 16.4 | +2.5 |
| Labor | Benjamin Watkins (elected 3) | 1,047 | 7.8 | −3.5 |
| Labor | Leonard Bennett | 978 | 7.2 | +7.2 |
| Liberal | Herbert Payne (elected 4) | 1,569 | 11.6 | −0.2 |
| Liberal | Edward Hobbs (elected 6) | 1,557 | 11.5 | +11.5 |
| Liberal | Stephen Margetts | 1,057 | 7.8 | +7.8 |
| Liberal | George Pullen | 1,039 | 7.7 | −2.9 |
| Independent | Joshua Whitsitt (elected 5) | 1,428 | 10.6 | +10.6 |
| Total formal votes | | 13,492 | 94.1 | −2.8 |
| Informal votes | | 851 | 5.9 | +2.8 |
| Turnout | | 14,343 | 73.9 | +11.9 |
Party total votes
| Labor | | 6,842 | 50.7 | −0.4 |
| Liberal | | 5,222 | 38.7 | −10.2 |
| Independent | Joshua Whitsitt | 1,428 | 10.6 | +10.6 |

==== 1913 ====
1913 Tasmanian state election: Darwin
| Party | Candidate | Votes | % | ±% |
|---|---|---|---|---|
| Quota | | 1,803 | | |
| Labor | James Ogden (elected 4) | 1,751 | 13.9 | +0.6 |
| Labor | James Belton (elected 1) | 1,736 | 13.8 | −0.9 |
| Labor | Benjamin Watkins (elected 6) | 1,426 | 11.3 | +2.7 |
| Labor | James Hurst | 1,372 | 10.9 | +0.4 |
| Labor | David Jones | 156 | 1.2 | +0.4 |
| Liberal | Joshua Whitsitt (elected 3) | 1,528 | 12.1 | −3.2 |
| Liberal | Herbert Payne (elected 2) | 1,484 | 11.8 | −2.9 |
| Liberal | George Pullen (elected 5) | 1,341 | 10.6 | +1.6 |
| Liberal | Kenric Laughton | 1,079 | 8.6 | +11.5 |
| Liberal | William Lamerton | 742 | 5.9 | −2.3 |
| Total formal votes | | 13,492 | 96.9 | −0.1 |
| Informal votes | | 400 | 3.1 | +0.1 |
| Turnout | | 13,892 | 62.6 | −6.2 |
Party total votes
| Labor | | 6,441 | 51.1 | +3.9 |
| Liberal | | 6,174 | 48.9 | −3.9 |
