= Harry Holgate =

Australian politician

The Honourable Harry Holgate AO

36th Premier of Tasmania
- In office 11 November 1981 – 26 May 1982
- Deputy: Michael Barnard
- Preceded by: Doug Lowe
- Succeeded by: Robin Gray
- Constituency: Bass

Personal details
- Born: 5 December 1933 Maitland, NSW, Australia
- Died: 16 March 1997 (aged 63) Launceston, Tasmania, Australia
- Party: Labor Party
- Spouse(s): Rosalind Wesley; Katharine White
- Occupation: Journalist

Harold Norman Holgate AO (5 December 1933 – 16 March 1997) was an Australian politician. He was premier of Tasmania from 1981 to 1982, serving as state leader of the Australian Labor Party (ALP) during that period. He succeeded Doug Lowe as party leader and premier during internal conflict over the Franklin Dam controversy, leading the ALP to defeat at the 1982 state election just over six months after taking office.

== Early life ==
Holgate was born on 5 December 1933 in Maitland, New South Wales. He was the son of Aleen Margaret (née Norman) and Harold William Holgate. His father, a journalist by profession, was killed in action during World War II while serving with the Royal Australian Air Force (RAAF).

Holgate attended Maitland Boys' High School. He joined the Sydney Morning Herald as a cadet in 1952 and later moved to Melbourne where he worked for The Herald. He was also active in radio and television. He arrived in Tasmania in 1963 to work for The Examiner in Launceston. He was the newspaper's political correspondent and deputy chief of staff, later transferring to the state government's Directorate of Industrial Development and Trade where he was a publicity manager. He joined ABC Television in 1970 as the executive producer of the Tasmanian edition of This Day Tonight.

Holgate's time at the ABC was controversial due to his open alignment with the ALP. Following his endorsement as an ALP candidate in 1972, four reporters on This Day Tonight stated that his role would compromise the political independence of the program and their role as independent reporters. Holgate was reinstated to the ABC after the 1972 election and the four reporters subsequently resigned.

== Politics ==
Holgate joined the ALP in the 1950s. He first stood for parliament at the 1972 state election, unsuccessfully contesting the seat of Bass. He subsequently served as press secretary to Tasmanian MP and deputy prime minister Lance Barnard. Holgate was elected to the Tasmanian House of Assembly in 1974 following a recount after the resignation of Allan Foster. He was elected speaker of the House of Assembly in 1975 in place of Eric Barnard, after less than a year in parliament. According to his ALP colleague Michael Polley, "other MPs, including Michael Barnard and Hedley Farquhar, saw Harry as a threat and decided to shut him up and put him in as Speaker".

As speaker, Holgate developed a high profile and was nicknamed "Headline Harry" for his use of publicity stunts. He studied part-time at the University of Tasmania during his first years in parliament and graduated Bachelor of Arts in 1976. Holgate was re-elected in Bass at the 1976 state election and subsequently resigned as speaker to take up a ministerial appointment in the government of Bill Neilson. He was initially responsible for the housing and reconstruction portfolios, then after a reshuffle in 1977 held the education, recreation and arts portfolios.

=== Premier of Tasmania ===
Holgate became Premier in 1981 after a motion of no confidence was raised against Doug Lowe, who subsequently resigned from the party. Holgate only stayed in office for seven months, before being defeated by Robin Gray's Liberals at the 1982 election—only the second time in 48 years that Labor had been consigned to opposition in Tasmania.

By March 1982, Holgate's public approval rating as premier was just 11 percent, with 66 percent disapproving of his performance according to a Morgan Gallup poll. He resigned as leader after the election, stating that he had "tried my best, but we were brought down before I could lead the Labor government back into a position of public esteem".

Until Lara Giddings in 2014, Holgate was the last defeated Premier who did not then serve as Leader of the Opposition. When the ALP next achieved government in 1989, under Michael Field, Holgate was not included in the cabinet. Nevertheless, he remained a member of parliament until he retired at the 1992 election.

== Personal life ==
In 1957, Holgate married Katharine White, the daughter of federal parliamentary librarian Harold White. They soon divorced and in 1963 he remarried to Rosalind Wesley, with whom he had four children.

Holgate was diagnosed with lung and liver cancer in 1996. He died on 16 March 1997 in Hillwood, Tasmania, and was granted a state funeral.

Tasmanian House of Assembly
Preceded by Eric Barnard	Speaker of the Tasmanian House of Assembly; 1975–1976	Succeeded by Glen Davies
Political offices
Preceded by Eric Barnard	Minister for Police and Emergency Services; 1979–1981	Succeeded by Bob Graham
Preceded by Julian Amos	Minister for Water Resources; 1981	Succeeded by Bob Graham
Preceded by Julian Amos	Minister for the Environment; 1981	Succeeded by Bob Graham
Preceded by Michael Field	Minister for Local Government; 1981	Succeeded by Bob Graham
Preceded by Doug Lowe	Treasurer of Tasmania; 1981–1982	Succeeded by Robin Gray
Preceded by Doug Lowe	Premier of Tasmania; 1981–1982	Succeeded by Robin Gray
Party political offices
Preceded by Doug Lowe	Leader of the Labor Party in Tasmania; 1981–1982	Succeeded by Ken Wriedt
