= Members of the Tasmanian House of Assembly, 1959–1964 =

This is a list of members of the Tasmanian House of Assembly between the 2 May 1959 election and the 2 May 1964 election. Prior to this election, each of the five Tasmanian seats had been expanded from 6 to 7 members to provide an odd number of members, due mainly to a series of hung parliaments.

Name	Party	Division	Years in office
Hon Alexander Atkins	Labor	Bass	1946–1948; 1956–1972
Charley Aylett	Labor/Independent	Denison	1946–1964
Eric Barnard	Labor	Franklin	1959–1979
Bill Beattie	Liberal	Bass	1946–1950; 1954–1979
Bert Bessell	Liberal	Wilmot	1956–1976
Angus Bethune	Liberal	Wilmot	1946–1975
Carrol Bramich	Liberal	Braddon	1946–1964
Jack Breheny	Liberal	Braddon	1951–1972
Joseph Britton	Labor	Braddon	1959–1964; 1975–1976
Max Bushby^{[4]}	Liberal	Bass	1961–1986
Hon Douglas Cashion	Labor	Wilmot	1949–1972
Lloyd Costello	Labor	Braddon	1959–1975
Hon John Dwyer^{[5]}	Labor	Franklin	1931–1962
Hon Roy Fagan	Labor	Wilmot	1946–1974
Wallace Fraser^{[3]}	Labor	Bass	1961–1969
Hon Dr John Gaha	Labor	Denison	1950–1964
Lynda Heaven^{[5]}	Labor	Franklin	1962–1964
Bill Hodgman	Liberal/Independent	Denison	1955–1964
Bob Ingamells	Liberal	Wilmot	1959–1976
Tim Jackson	Liberal/Independent	Franklin	1946–1964
Mac Le Fevre	Labor	Bass	1959–1969; 1972–1976
Kevin Lyons	Liberal	Braddon	1948–1972
Thomas McDonald	Labor	Wilmot	1959–1969
James McGowen^{[2]}	Liberal	Bass	1961–1964
Hon Harry McLoughlin	Labor	Denison	1959–1969
Hon William McNeil	Labor	Wilmot	1959–1964
Hon John Madden	Labor	Bass	1936–1956; 1957–1969
Fred Marriott^{[2]}	Liberal	Bass	1946–1961
Mabel Miller	Liberal	Franklin	1955–1964
Hon Bill Neilson	Labor	Franklin	1946–1977
Sir Archibald Park^{[1]}	Liberal	Denison	1949–1955; 1959
Thomas Pearsall	Liberal	Franklin	1950–1966
Hon Eric Reece	Labor	Braddon	1946–1975
John Steer^{[4]}	Liberal	Bass	1950–1961; 1964–1968
Horace Strutt^{[1]}	Liberal	Denison	1946–1959; 1959–1969
Rex Townley	Liberal	Denison	1946–1965
Hon Dr Reg Turnbull^{[3]}	Independent	Bass	1946–1961
Hon Sydney Ward	Labor	Braddon	1956–1976
Bill Wedd	Independent	Denison	1948–1953; 1959–1964
Bill Young	Liberal	Franklin	1959–1969

== Notes ==
^{1} Liberal MHA for Denison, Sir Archibald Park, died on 18 November 1959. A recount on 4 December 1959 resulted in the election of former Liberal MHA Horace Strutt.
^{2} Liberal MHA for Bass, Fred Marriott, resigned on 30 October 1961 to contest the federal election for the seat of Bass, but was unsuccessful. A recount on 10 November 1961 resulted in the election of Liberal candidate James McGowen.
^{3} Independent MHA for Bass, Reg Turnbull, resigned on 30 October 1961 to contest an Australian Senate seat in the federal election, in which he was successful. A recount on 10 November 1961 resulted in the election of Labor candidate Wallace Fraser.
^{4} Liberal MHA for Bass, John Steer, resigned on 22 November 1961 to contest the Council seat of Cornwall, but was unsuccessful. A recount on 1 December 1961 resulted in the election of Liberal candidate Max Bushby.
^{5} Labor MHA for Franklin, John Dwyer, died on 17 January 1962. At a recount on 5 February 1962, former Labor MHA (now Independent) Brian Crawford was elected, but he was disqualified on the grounds of non-residence. A further recount on 9 March 1962 elected Lynda Heaven, the first Labor woman to be elected to the House.

== Sources ==
- Hughes, Colin A.; Graham, B. D. (1976). Voting for the South Australian, Western Australian and Tasmanian Lower Houses, 1890-1964. Canberra: Australian National University. ISBN 0-7081-1334-6.
- Parliament of Tasmania (2006). The Parliament of Tasmania from 1856
