= Max Bingham =

Australian politician (1927–2021)

The Honourable Sir Max Bingham QC
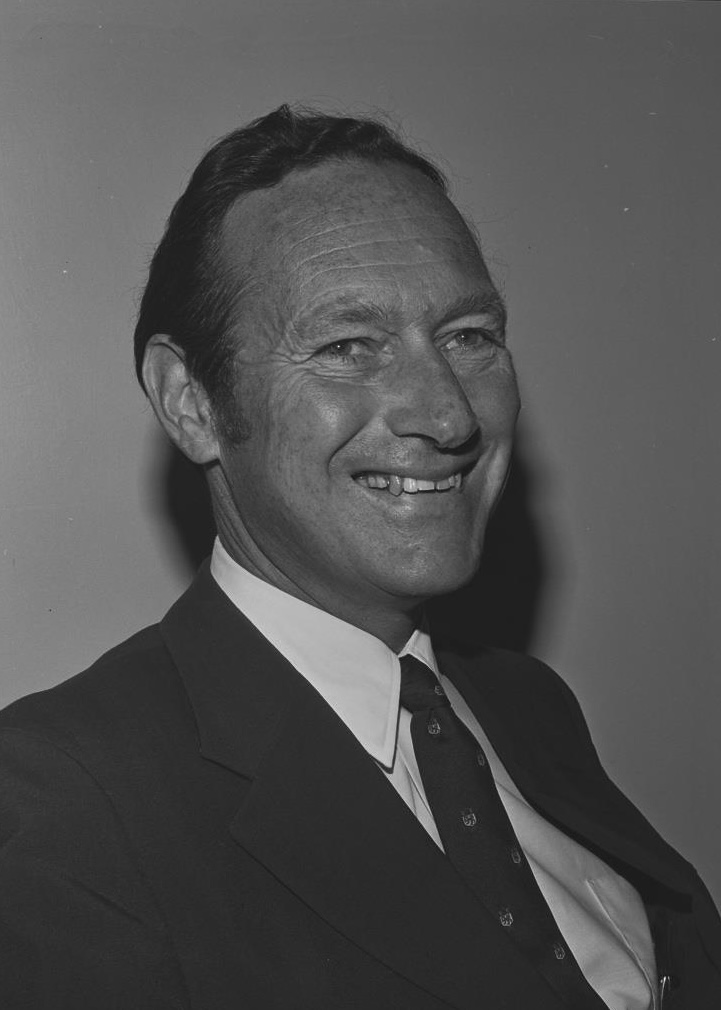
- Bingham in 1973

Deputy Premier of Tasmania
- In office 27 May 1982 – 13 June 1984
- Premier: Robin Gray
- Preceded by: Michael Barnard
- Succeeded by: Geoff Pearsall

Attorney-General of Tasmania
- In office 26 May 1969 – 3 May 1972
- Premier: Angus Bethune
- Preceded by: Roy Fagan
- Succeeded by: Merv Everett
- In office 27 May 1982 – 13 June 1984
- Premier: Robin Gray
- Preceded by: Roy Fagan
- Succeeded by: Merv Everett

Personal details
- Born: Eardley Max Bingham; 18 March 1927 Hobart, Tasmania, Australia
- Died: 30 November 2021 (aged 94) Hobart, Tasmania, Australia
- Party: Liberal Party
- Spouse: Margaret Garrett Jesson
- Education: University of Tasmania (LLB Hons, 1950); Lincoln College, Oxford (BCL, 1953)
- Profession: Lawyer

Military service
- Allegiance: Australia
- Branch/service: Royal Australian Navy
- Years of service: 1945–1946
- Rank: Able Seaman
- Unit: HMAS Bingera; HMAS Cerberus

Sir Eardley Max Bingham QC (18 March 1927 – 30 November 2021), was an Australian politician. He was Deputy Premier and Opposition Leader of Tasmania, who represented the electorate of Denison for the Liberal Party in the Tasmanian House of Assembly from 1969 to 1984.

== Early life and education ==
Born at the Queen Alexandra Hospital in Battery Point, Hobart, Bingham was the only son of Mr and Mrs Thomas Bingham of Sandy Bay. He was educated in New South Wales and Tasmania, completing his secondary schooling with four years at Hobart High School. At the age of 18, he enlisted in the Royal Australian Navy in April 1945, and served as an able seaman at shore stations including HMAS Cerberus, and the auxiliary anti-submarine vessel HMAS Bingera, until his discharge in December 1946.

He was selected as the 1950 Tasmanian Rhodes Scholar. In that year, he graduated with a Bachelor of Laws with honours from the University of Tasmania. Bingham read for and received a Bachelor of Civil Law at Lincoln College, Oxford. Whilst at Oxford, Bingham met and married Margaret Jesson of Staffordshire (he had previously been engaged to Rhonda Harvey). He returned to Hobart in 1953, where he practised alongside Reg Wright, to whom he was articled at the University of Tasmania.

== Political career ==
Bingham entered the Tasmanian Parliament when he was elected as a member for Denison at the 1969 state election on 10 May. On 26 May, he was made a minister in Angus Bethune's cabinet, becoming Attorney-General and Minister Administering the Police Department and the Licensing Act; also briefly holding the Health and Road Safety portfolio from March to May 1972. On 4 May 1972, he was elected leader of the Liberal Party in Tasmania (and opposition leader), following Bethune's resignation.

He contested two elections as opposition leader (1976 and 1979), but stood down as leader after the Liberal Party's two losses. Bingham's replacement as Liberal leader, Geoff Pearsall, resigned and was replaced by Robin Gray in November 1981. Gray led the Liberals to victory in the 1982 election, and Bingham was appointed Deputy Premier and Attorney-General in Gray's cabinet (as well as Minister for Education, Industrial Relations, and Police and Emergency Services).

== After politics ==
Bingham resigned from parliament on 13 June 1984, and subsequently joined the National Crime Authority, a federal law enforcement body focussing on organised crime. In 1989, he was a founding commissioner of the Criminal Justice Commission in Queensland—responsible for a review into the powers of the Queensland Police recommended by the Fitzgerald Inquiry. Bingham's report for the CJC was released in 1994.

In 1996, Bingham was assigned to chair a further review on police powers in Queensland, which he commented were "...unsatisfactory because the police are uncertain of their powers and suspects are uncertain about their rights." The committee's recommendations on legislation of police powers and extensive community consultation led to the passing of the Police Powers and Responsibilities Act 1997.

He died in Hobart on 30 November 2021, at the age of 94.

== Honours ==
Max Bingham was knighted in the Queen's Birthday Honours on 15 June 1988, with the citation "In recognition of service to the law, crime prevention, parliament and the community". He was awarded the Centenary Medal in 2001.

On 15 April 1991, the Governor of Tasmania granted Bingham the right to use the title 'The Honourable' for life.

Coat of arms of Max Bingham
Notes Granted by the College of Arms, 18 March 2013. Crest On a Chapeau Azure turned up Argent charged with Lozenges conjoined throughout Gules the cap encircled by a Wreath of Olive Or tied Gules a Thylacine statant Or striped Sable holding in its mouth a Pair of Scales Argent. Escutcheon Paly wavy extended fesswise Azure and Argent in chief five lozenges conjoined throughout the outer pair issuant from the flanks Gules. Motto Cura Et Contende

Political offices
Preceded by Roy Fagan	Attorney-General of Tasmania; 1969–1972	Succeeded by Merv Everett
Preceded by Nigel Abbott	Minister for Health and Road Safety; 1972	Succeeded by Allan Foster
Preceded by Eric Reece	Leader of the Opposition (Tasmania); 1972–1979	Succeeded by Geoff Pearsall
Preceded by Michael Barnard	Deputy Premier of Tasmania; 1982–1984	Succeeded by Geoff Pearsall
Preceded by Roy Fagan	Attorney-General of Tasmania; 1982–1984	Succeeded by Merv Everett
Preceded by Terry Aulich	Minister for Education; 1982–1984	Succeeded by John Beswick
Preceded by Terry Aulich	Minister for Industrial Relations; 1982–1984	Succeeded by Geoff Pearsall
Preceded by Robert Graham	Minister for Police and Emergency Services; 1982–1983	Succeeded by Roger Groom
Party political offices
Preceded by Angus Bethune	Leader of the Liberal Party in Tasmania; 1972–1979	Succeeded by Geoff Pearsall
