= Speaker of the Tasmanian House of Assembly =

Presiding officer of the lower house in the Parliament of Tasmania

Speaker of the House of Assembly
- Incumbent; Jacquie Petrusma since 19 August 2025
- Style: The Honourable
- Nominator: Tasmanian political parties
- Appointer: Elected by the Tasmanian House of Assembly
- Term length: Parliamentary term
- Inaugural holder: Michael Fenton
- Formation: 2 December 1856

The Speaker of the Tasmanian House of Assembly is the presiding officer of the lower house of the Parliament of Tasmania. The role of Speaker has traditionally been a partisan office, filled by the governing party of the time.

The current speaker is Jacquie Petrusma of the Liberal Party, with her having been elected by 25 votes to 10 on 19 August 2025.

== Speakers of the Tasmanian House of Assembly ==
No.	Member	Party	Term in office
1	Michael Fenton	None	2 December 1856 – 8 May 1861
2	Robert Officer	None	15 August 1861 – 20 April 1877
3	Henry Butler	None	24 April 1877 – 21 July 1885
4	Alfred Dobson	None	21 July 1885 – 31 May 1887
5	Thomas Reibey	None	12 July 1887 – 30 April 1891
6	Nicholas John Brown	None	7 July 1891 – 2 December 1893
7	Stafford Bird	Revenue Tariff Party	28 February 1894 – 8 March 1897
–	Nicholas John Brown	None	9 March 1897 – 22 September 1903
8	John Davies	Anti-Socialist Party	29 September 1903 – 27 December 1912
9	John Evans	Liberal Party	22 April 1913 – 24 March 1914
10	Walter Woods	Labor Party	25 March 1914 – 29 February 1916
–	John Evans	Nationalist Party of Australia	16 May 1916 – 27 July 1925
11	Michael O'Keefe	Labor Party	28 July 1925 – 2 October 1926
–	Walter Woods	Labor Party	13 October 1926 – 16 July 1928
–	John Evans	Nationalist Party of Australia	17 July 1928 – 17 July 1934
12	David O'Keefe	Labor Party	18 July 1934 – 9 February 1942
13	John Dwyer	Labor Party	10 February 1942 – 29 June 1948
14	Peter Pike	Labor Party	29 June 1948 – 3 September 1949
15	Bill Wedd	Independent	13 September 1949 – 6 June 1950
16	Lancelot Spurr	Labor Party	7 June 1950 – 12 April 1955
17	Horace Strutt	Liberal Party	13 April 1955 – 28 October 1956
18	Kevin Lyons	Liberal Party	29 October 1956 – 1 June 1959
19	Charley Aylett	Labor Party	2 June 1959 – 1 May 1964
20	John Madden	Labor Party	25 June 1964 – 9 May 1969
21	Bob Ingamells	Liberal Party	17 June 1969 – 6 June 1972
22	Eric Barnard	Labor Party	7 June 1972 – 6 May 1975
23	Harry Holgate	Labor Party	6 May 1975 – 21 December 1976
24	Glen Davies	Labor Party	14 February 1977 – 10 September 1979
25	Andrew Lohrey	Labor Party	11 September 1979 – 25 February 1980
–	Glen Davies	Labor Party	5 March 1980 – 14 June 1982
26	Max Bushby	Liberal Party	15 June 1982 – 8 February 1986
27	Ron Cornish	Liberal Party	12 March 1986 – 1 November 1988
28	Tony Rundle	Liberal Party	9 November 1988 – 27 June 1989
29	Michael Polley	Labor Party	28 June 1989 – 13 April 1992
30	Graeme Page	Liberal Party	14 April 1992 – 23 February 1996
31	Frank Madill	Liberal Party	23 April 1996 – 5 October 1998
–	Michael Polley	Labor Party	6 October 1998 – 31 March 2014
32	Elise Archer	Liberal Party	31 March 2014 – 2 October 2017
33	Mark Shelton	Liberal Party	17 October 2017 – 1 May 2018
34	Sue Hickey	Liberal Party (Until 22 March 2021); Independent (From 22 March 2021)	1 May 2018 – 22 June 2021
–	Mark Shelton	Liberal Party	22 June 2021 – 14 May 2024
35	Michelle O'Byrne	Labor Party	14 May 2024 – 19 July 2025
36	Jacquie Petrusma	Liberal Party	19 August 2025 – present
