= Mike Gard =

Australian politician

Michael Gard (born 24 January 1952) is a former Australian politician. He was born in Franklin, Tasmania. He was an unsuccessful Labor candidate for Braddon in the 1996 Tasmanian election, but in 1997 he was elected in a countback following the resignation of Michael Field. He was defeated in 1998, when the House was reduced in size.
