= Michael Fenton (politician) =

Australian politician

Captain Michael Fenton

1st Speaker of the Tasmanian House of Assembly
- In office 2 December 1856 – 8 May 1861
- Succeeded by: Robert Officer

Personal details
- Born: 1789 Castletown, County Sligo, Kingdom of Ireland
- Died: 6 April 1874 (aged 84–85) New Norfolk, Tasmania
- Spouse: Elizabeth Campbell (m. 1828–1874)

Military service
- Allegiance: United Kingdom
- Branch/service: British Army
- Years of service: 1807–1828
- Rank: Captain
- Unit: 13th Light Infantry Regiment

Michael Fenton (1789 – 6 April 1874) was a politician in colonial Tasmania. He was the first Speaker of the Tasmanian House of Assembly.

== Biography ==
Michael Fenton was born in Castle Town, County Sligo, Ireland, the third son of Michael Fenton, who served as the high sheriff of Sligo.

Fenton was a captain in the 13th Light Infantry Regiment. After service in India and Burma, he sold his commission and emigrated to Tasmania (then Van Diemen's Land) in 1829, settling on a grant of land at Fenton Forest, near Glenora, on the River Derwent.

He was appointed a member of the nominee Tasmanian Legislative Council by Sir John Franklin in 1840, and was one of the "Patriotic Six" who resigned their seats in the Council in order to frustrate the financial policy of Governor John Eardley-Wilmot, in October 1845. However, he was reappointed by royal warrant in March 1847. In 1851 Fenton became one of the first elected members of the Legislative Council, representing New Norfolk. In 1855 he was elected Speaker in succession to Sir Richard Dry. When responsible government was conceded, he entered the House of Assembly for New Norfolk and was elected the first Speaker in December 1856. Fenton continued to fill the chair of the House until retiring in May 1861. He was succeeded by Robert Officer.

== Personal ==
In 1828 Fenton married Elizabeth Campbell, widow of Captain Neil Campbell, also of the 13th Light Infantry at Calcutta. Her father, Reverend John Russel Knox, was rector of Lifford and Inishmagrath, County Leitrim. They had six children; one son and three daughters survived Fenton. Michael Fenton died at his residence 'Fenton Forest', about 22 kilometres west of New Norfolk, on 6 April 1874 at the age of 85. Elizabeth wrote a journal titled A Narrative of Her Life in India, the Isle of France and Tasmania During the Years 1826–1830. Elizabeth died on 10 March 1876, also at 'Fenton Forest'.
