= Geoff Pearsall =

Australian politician

The Honourable Geoff Pearsall

Deputy Premier of Tasmania
- In office 15 June 1984 – 1 November 1988
- Premier: Robin Gray
- Preceded by: Max Bingham
- Succeeded by: Ray Groom

Member of the Tasmanian House of Assembly for Franklin
- In office 10 May 1969 – 1 November 1988

Personal details
- Born: 15 September 1946 (age 79) Hobart, Tasmania, Australia
- Party: Liberal Party
- Spouse: Heidee Pearsall

Geoffrey Alan "Geoff" Pearsall (born 15 September 1946) is a former Australian politician. A member of the Liberal Party, he served as a member of the Tasmanian House of Assembly from 1969 until 1988 and as Leader of the Opposition (1979–1981). Robin Gray succeeded him in the latter role.

== Early life ==
Pearsall was born in Hobart, Tasmania, to Thomas Pearsall, who had been one of the seven members for Division of Franklin from 1950 to 1966, and served one term as a Federal MP for the same electorate in the House of Representatives. Pearsall's grandfather, Benjamin Pearsall, had also held a Franklin seat for two non-contiguous terms during the Great Depression.

== Career ==
At the 1969 election, Pearsall stood for and won a Franklin seat, which he was to hold for the following 19 years. He failed by one vote in August 1978 to take the deputy leadership from Ray Bonney. After Max Bingham stepped down as Leader of the Opposition following the July 1979 election, which had seen a swing to the incumbent Labor Party in Premier Doug Lowe's first election as leader, Pearsall was elected unopposed as leader on 7 August, with Robin Gray as deputy leader.

The first part of his term was consumed by the electoral crisis which led to the Denison state by-election in 1980. He had an otherwise uneventful term before unexpectedly resigning as party leader for "personal reasons" on 10 November 1981—it was later revealed that powerful conservative elements within the Liberal Party had forced him to resign, after his personal life and breakup of his marriage led to concerns about his image.

His deputy, Robin Gray, was elected unopposed, and went on to become premier at the 1982 election. After the election, Pearsall became Minister for Tourism, National Parks and Recreational Lands, Environment and Licensing. Following Bingham's retirement from parliament, Pearsall became Deputy Premier, losing the two environment portfolios but picking up Police and Emergency Services, Road Safety and Gaming.

== Later life ==
He resigned from parliament on 1 November 1988, announcing that he was moving to the Gold Coast to manage a tourist resort with his private secretary and long-time friend, Peter Sullivan. Pearsall was accorded the title "The Honourable" for life on 20 April 1989.

Political offices
Preceded by Max Bingham	Leader of the Opposition; 1979–1981	Succeeded by Robin Gray
Preceded by Max Bingham	Deputy Premier of Tasmania; 1984–1988	Succeeded by Ray Groom
