= Andrew Lohrey =

Australian politician

The Honourable Dr Andrew Lohrey

Speaker of the Tasmanian House of Assembly
- In office 11 September 1979 – 25 February 1980
- Preceded by: Glen Davies
- Succeeded by: Glen Davies

Member of the Tasmanian House of Assembly for Wilmot/Lyons
- In office 22 April 1972 – 8 February 1986

Personal details
- Born: 15 December 1939 (age 86)
- Party: Labor Party
- Spouse: Amanda Lohrey

Andrew Barnard Keith Lohrey (born 15 December 1939) is a former Australian politician.

Lohrey received a Bachelor of Arts and a PhD before entering politics. He was elected to the Tasmanian House of Assembly as a Labor member for Wilmot in 1972. He served as Speaker from 1979 to 1980 and also served as a minister, but he was defeated in 1986.

He is married to the author Amanda Lohrey.
