= 1996 Tasmanian state election =

State election in Australia

- 24 February 1996

All 35 seats to the House of Assembly 18 seats needed for a majority

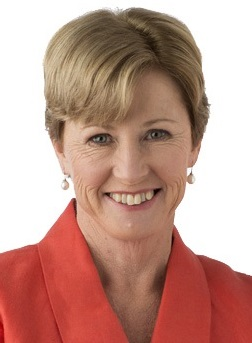
	First party	Second party	Third party
Leader	Ray Groom	Michael Field	Christine Milne
Party	Liberal	Labor	Greens
Leader since	17 December 1991	14 December 1988	1993
Leader's seat	Denison	Braddon	Lyons
Last election	19 seats	11 seats	5 seats
Seats won	16	14	4
Seat change	▼3	▲3	▼1
Popular vote	121,391	119,260	32,813
Percentage	41.21%	40.47%	11.14%
Swing	▼12.91	▲11.62	▼2.09
- Results of the election
Premier before election
Ray Groom
Liberal
Resulting Premier
Tony Rundle
Liberal

The 1996 Tasmanian state election was held on 24 February 1996 in the Australian state of Tasmania to elect 35 members of the Tasmanian House of Assembly. The election used the Hare-Clark proportional representation system — seven members were elected from each of five electorates. The quota required for election was 12.5% in each division.

The Liberal Party, led by Ray Groom, hoped to secure another term in government. The Opposition Labor party was headed by Michael Field and the Tasmanian Greens were headed by Christine Milne.

Prior to the election, the Liberal Party held 19 of the 35 seats, a majority in the House of Assembly. Labor held 11 and the Tasmanian Greens held five.

Before the election, Groom and Field both promised that they would only govern in majority.

== Extremely Greedy 40% Extra Party ==
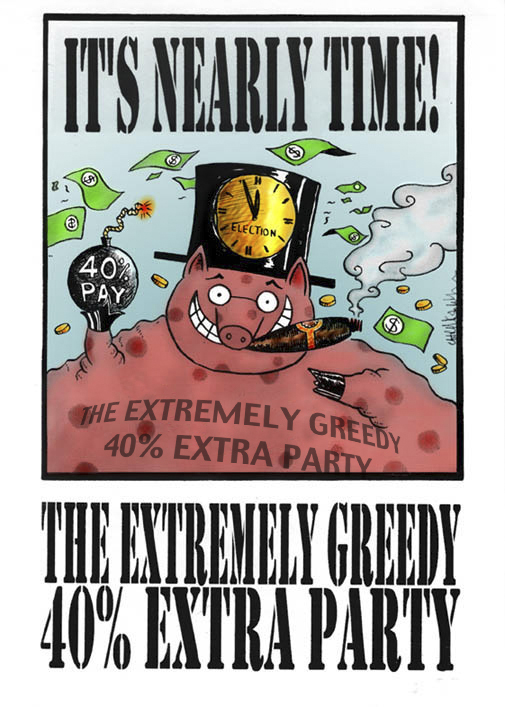

The Extremely Greedy 40% Extra Party was a single-issue political party which contested the election. It was formed to oppose what was seen as an excessive pay rise the Tasmanian Parliament had awarded to itself.

In October 1993, Tasmanian parliamentarians voted to link their pay to 90% of an equivalent federal parliamentarian. This resulted in an immediate 40% pay rise. The legislation took about an hour or so to pass through both houses of Parliament. In the Lower House, the 19 Liberal and 11 Labor members voted for the legislation and the 5 Greens voted against. The Upper House suspended Standing Orders to speed the passage of the bill.

The Extremely Greedy Party was formed in 1993 with an intention to stand candidates at the 1996 election in all electorates. As the increase was made in the early part of Groom's term (hoping the electorate would forget), the strategy of the party was simply to ensure the electorate were reminded of the earlier pay rise incident through the party name being on the ballot papers. Bumper stickers were placed on cars around the state reading "40% never forget" although politicians' wages had been on freeze for some time and the rise was in keeping with inflation.

Six months after the election, the Tasmanian Parliament passed a bill to refer the matter of setting Tasmanian Parliamentary salaries to the Tasmanian Industrial Commission (TIC). The decision of the commission was to reduce the state MP salary to 83% of a federal parliamentarian based on the ratio of average Tasmanian wages to average Australian mainland wages.

== Results ==
The election ended with a swing against the Liberals. A fall of over 10% caused them to lose their parliamentary majority. The Liberals lost four sitting members; Carole Cains, John Barker, Brian Davison and Graeme Page. The Liberals polled strongly in Braddon and Bass but poorly in Franklin.

Labor polled well in the Hobart area (Denison and Franklin). The Tasmanian Greens suffered a statewide swing of over two percent against them and lost one of their seats (Lance Armstrong in Bass) but gained the balance of power because Di Hollister narrowly held onto her seat in Braddon, while the party received a high vote in Denison.

The Extremely Greedy 40% Extra Party polled 0.8% of the vote, well behind winning a seat, but its appearance on the ballot paper succeeded in reminding voters of the previous wage increases. Independent Bruce Goodluck narrowly won a seat at the expense of the Liberals' Paul Harriss. The Australian Democrats ran four candidates in Franklin but were unsuccessful at winning a seat.

Summary of the Results of the 1996 Tasmanian state election, House of Assembly
Party	Votes	%	+/–	Seats	+/–
Liberal	121,391	41.20	▼12.91	16	▼3
Labor	119,260	40.47	▲11.62	14	▲3
Greens	32,813	11.14	▼2.09	4	▼1
Nationals	6,476	2.20	▲2.20	0	Steady
Extremely Greedy 40 Extra	2,251	0.76	New	0	New
Democrats	2,190	0.74	▲0.74	0	Steady
Independents	10,290	3.49	▲2.36	1	▲1
Total	294,671	100.00	–	35	–
Valid votes	294,671	94.60			
Invalid/blank votes	16,815	5.40			
Total votes	311,486	100.00			
Registered voters/turnout	324,556	95.97			

=== Primary vote by division ===
	Bass	Braddon	Denison	Franklin	Lyons
Labor Party	38.9%	34.4%	45.4%	42.7%	40.8%
Liberal Party	47.7%	49.6%	35.4%	32.0%	41.6%
Tasmanian Greens	10.3%	9.1%	14.0%	10.7%	11.4%
Other	3.2%	6.9%	5.2%	14.6%	6.2%

=== Distribution of seats ===
Electorate	Seats won
Bass	
Braddon	
Denison	
Franklin	
Lyons	

Labor
Liberal
Greens
Independent

== Aftermath ==
Labor had the numbers to enter minority government with the Greens, but Field refused to go back on his word to only govern in majority. This left a Liberal minority government as the only realistic option. Groom was not willing to break his own promise to only govern in majority, and was replaced as Liberal leader and premier by Tony Rundle, who reached an informal agreement with the Greens.

This election was the last time that Tasmanians voted 35 members into parliament until 2024, as the seat number was reduced to 25 members in 1998.

== See also ==
- Candidates of the 1996 Tasmanian state election
- Members of the Tasmanian House of Assembly, 1996–1998
