= Ian Cole (politician) =

Australian politician

Ian Kenneth Cole

Member of the Tasmanian House of Assembly for Denison
- In office 1974–1976
- Preceded by: Merv Everett
- Constituency: Denison

Personal details
- Born: October 31, 1947 (age 78)
- Party: Labor

Ian Kenneth Cole (born 31 October 1947) is a former Australian politician.

In 1974, he was elected to the Tasmanian House of Assembly as a Labor member for Denison in a recount following Merv Everett's resignation to contest the Senate. He served as Deputy Chair of Committees, but was defeated at the following election in 1976.
