= Max Bushby =

Australian politician

The Honourable Max Bushby OBE

26th Speaker of the Tasmanian House of Assembly
- In office 15 June 1982 – 8 February 1986
- Preceded by: Glen Davies
- Succeeded by: Ron Cornish

Member of the Tasmanian House of Assembly for Bass
- In office 1 December 1961 – 8 February 1986

Personal details
- Born: Maxwell Holmes Bushby; 19 July 1927 Launceston, Tasmania, Australia
- Died: 21 August 1994 (aged 67) Launceston, Tasmania, Australia
- Party: Liberal Party
- Spouse: Hazel (Elaine) Morris (m. 1954)
- Children: Peter Bushby, Michael Bushby, Wendy Askew, David Bushby, Helen Woodfall
- Occupation: Real Estate Agent and Politician

Maxwell Holmes Bushby OBE (19 July 1927 – 21 August 1994) was an Australian politician. He was elected to the Tasmanian House of Assembly in 1961 as a Liberal member for Bass. He was Chair of Committees from 1966 to 1972 and Speaker from 1982 to 1986. He was defeated at the 1986 election.

His son, David Bushby, was also a politician, serving as a Senator for Tasmania from 2007 to January 2019, before he was appointed as Australia's consul-general in Chicago. Maxwell's daughter, Wendy Askew, was appointed as her brother's replacement, serving as a Senator for Tasmania since 6 March 2019.

Parliament of Tasmania
Preceded by Glen Davies	Speaker of the Tasmanian House of Assembly; 1982–1986	Succeeded by Ron Cornish
