= Carole Cains =

Australian former politician

Carole Susan Cains (born 29 November 1943) is an Australian former politician. She was born in Derby, England. In 1992, she was elected to the Tasmanian House of Assembly representing Braddon for the Liberal Party. She was defeated in 1996, but in 1997 was elected in a countback to replace Roger Groom, who had retired. Cains was again defeated in 1998 after the size of the Assembly was reduced.
