= Michael Barnard (politician) =

Australian politician

Deputy Premier of Tasmania
- In office 29 August 1980 – 27 May 1982
- Premier: Doug Lowe (1980–81); Harry Holgate (1981–82)
- Preceded by: Neil Batt
- Succeeded by: Max Bingham

Personal details
- Born: Michael Thomas Claude Barnard; 27 September 1942 Launceston, Tasmania, Australia
- Died: 11 December 1999 (aged 57) Queensland, Australia
- Party: Labor Party
- Relations: Claude Barnard (grandfather); Lance Barnard (uncle)

Michael Thomas Claude Barnard (27 September 1942 – 11 December 1999) was an Australian politician. He was a member of the Tasmanian House of Assembly from 1969 to 1984, representing Bass for the Labor Party. He was Deputy Premier under two Labor Premiers, Doug Lowe and Harry Holgate from 1980 to 1982, and a long-standing Minister for Tourism (1975–82) and Health (1977–80).

Barnard had numerous family political connections. He was the grandson of Claude Barnard and the nephew of Lance Barnard, who both served in the Australian House of Representatives as federal members for Bass. Claude Barnard had also held the state seat of Bass in the 1950s. Michael Barnard's retirement in 1984 ended the Barnard family's representation in Tasmanian and Australian politics.

Political offices
Preceded by Neil Batt	Deputy Premier of Tasmania; 1980–1982	Succeeded by Max Bingham
