= Merv Everett =

Australian politician and judge

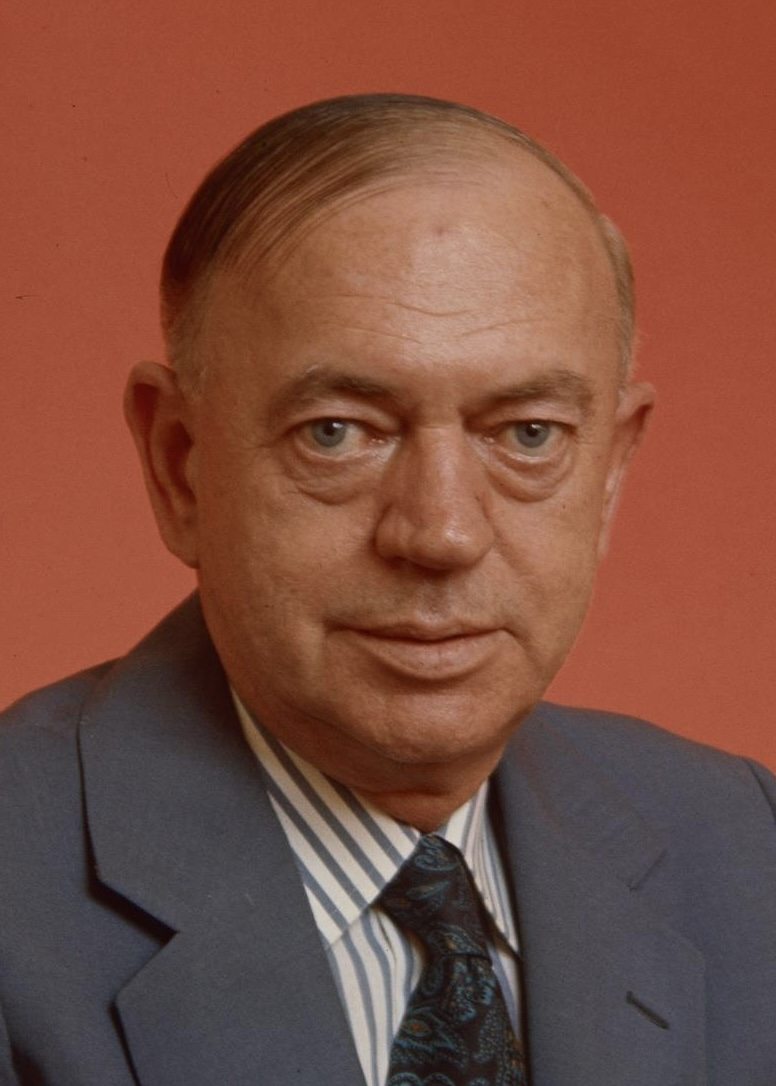
- Everett in 1974

Senator for Tasmania
- In office 18 May 1974 – 11 November 1975

Personal details
- Born: 7 October 1917 Sandy Bay, Tasmania, Australia
- Died: 27 October 1988 (aged 71) Singapore
- Party: Labor
- Education: University of Tasmania
- Profession: Barrister

Mervyn George Everett (7 October 1917 – 27 October 1988) was an Australian politician and judge.

Born in Hobart, Tasmania, Everett was educated at the University of Tasmania before becoming a barrister. In 1964, he was elected to the Tasmanian House of Assembly as the Labor member for Denison. He was Minister for Health 1964–1969, then Deputy Premier, Attorney-General and Minister for Environment, Racing and Gaming 1972–1974.

In July and August 1972, during the controversy over the flooding of Lake Pedder in South West Tasmania, Everett twice resigned as Tasmania's Deputy Premier and Attorney-General, stating at the time, "Because I am Attorney-General I clearly have a traditional duty to act as protector of the public interest." This was in response to state cabinet's refusal to allow a Supreme Court challenge by the Lake Pedder Action Committee (LPAC) over the legality of the inundation of the lake by the state's Hydro-Electric Commission. In late July 1972 the LPAC had sought Attorney-General Everett's fiat for litigation to proceed, and this was opposed by Premier Eric Reece and his cabinet, who wanted instead to introduce retrospective validating legislation.

In 1974, Everett transferred to federal politics, winning a Tasmanian seat in the Australian Senate for the Australian Labor Party. He was defeated in 1975.

After his retirement from politics, Everett returned to the law. He was appointed to the Supreme Court of Tasmania by the Lowe government, serving from 7 November 1978 to 14 March 1984. He was appointed to the Federal Court of Australia by the Hawke Labor government, serving from 27 June 1984 to 4 October 1987. Everett is one of only six politicians to have served in both the Parliament of Australia and the Federal Court of Australia, alongside Nigel Bowen, Robert Ellicott, Tony Whitlam, John Reeves and Duncan Kerr.
