= Ron Cornish =

Australian politician

The Honourable Ron Cornish

27th Speaker of the Tasmanian House of Assembly
- In office 12 March 1986 – 1 November 1988
- Preceded by: Max Bushby
- Succeeded by: Tony Rundle

Member of the Tasmanian House of Assembly for Braddon
- In office 11 December 1976 – 29 August 1998

Personal details
- Born: 21 March 1944 (age 82) Burnie, Tasmania, Australia
- Party: Liberal

Ronald Cornish (born 21 March 1944) is a former Australian politician. He was born in Burnie, Tasmania. In 1976, he was elected to the Tasmanian House of Assembly representing Braddon for the Liberal Party. He served as Speaker of the House from 1986 to 1988 and was a minister from 1988 to 1989 and 1992 to 1998, when he retired.
