= Michael Field (politician) =

Australian politician (born 1948)

The Honourable Michael Field AC

38th Premier of Tasmania
- In office 29 June 1989 – 17 February 1992
- Monarch: Elizabeth II
- Governor: Sir Phillip Bennett
- Deputy: Peter Patmore
- Preceded by: Robin Gray
- Succeeded by: Ray Groom

Chancellor of the University of Tasmania
- In office 1 January 2013 – 30 June 2021
- Preceded by: Damian Bugg
- Succeeded by: Alison Watkins

Member of the Tasmanian House of Assembly for Braddon
- In office 1976–1997
- Preceded by: Joseph Britton
- Succeeded by: Mike Gard

Personal details
- Born: 28 May 1948 (age 78) Latrobe, Tasmania, Australia
- Party: Labor Party
- Spouse: Jan Field
- Education: University of Tasmania
- Occupation: Politician
- Profession: Politics

Michael Walter Field AC (born 28 May 1948 in Latrobe, Tasmania), is a former Australian politician, holding office as the Premier of Tasmania between 1989 and 1992. Field is also a former chancellor of the University of Tasmania, holding that position from January 2013 to 30 June 2021. He was leader of the Tasmanian Branch of the Labor Party from 1988 until his retirement in 1996. Field is best known for operating in minority government with the support of the Independents, Tasmania's nascent Green party, with an agreement known as the Labor–Green Accord.

== Biography ==
Field grew up on the north-west coast of Tasmania, attending Devonport High School. He graduated from the University of Tasmania in 1971 with a Bachelor of Arts in history and political science. He was elected to the Tasmanian House of Assembly for Braddon in 1976 and was at various times a cabinet minister, premier and leader of the opposition.

At the 1989 state election, Labor suffered a one-seat swing. However, the incumbent Liberal government under Robin Gray lost two seats, and in the process lost its majority. The balance of power rested with the Greens who won five seats. Field then reached an agreement with Independent leader Bob Brown, giving Field enough support to form government by one seat.

Gray had initially intended to form a minority government. When the accord was signed on 29 May, Gray asked the Governor, Sir Phillip Bennett for new elections. However, Bennett refused, concluding that Gray no longer had enough support to govern and had therefore lost the right to seek a dissolution. The Greens had also privately assured Field that they would support a Labor minority government. This was tested on the floor of the house and a motion was passed that expressed no confidence in Gray and confidence in Field. Bennett then duly commissioned Field as premier.

Field's government presided over painful fiscal reforms that, while unpopular at the time, helped rehabilitate the state's finances in the long run. The Greens terminated the accord in 1990 but Field was able to survive a confidence vote in 1991. However, at the 1992 state election, Labor was severely punished not only for its fiscal belt-tightening, but for dealing with the Greens. Its popular vote plummeted to 28.9 percent, while the Liberals won a solid majority. Despite this severe defeat, Field was not blamed for the debacle and stayed on as leader.

Field stayed on through a federal intervention in the state Labor Party, and led Labor into the 1996 state election. Field promised that he would only govern in majority. He also promised that if the Liberals were reduced to a minority government, he would not bring it down in its first year. At the election, Labor took three seats. While this cost the Liberals their majority, it was short of what Labor needed to make Field premier once again. Although Labor and the Greens had enough seats between them to form government, Field kept his word and did not seek Green support to govern. This left a Liberal minority government supported by the Greens as the only realistic option. However, Groom had also promised only to govern in majority, and resigned as premier in favour of Tony Rundle, who reached a deal with the Greens.

Since retiring from politics in 1997, Field began working as a management and leadership consultant. In 2003, Field was appointed a Companion of the Order of Australia for his service to the Parliament of Tasmania. He received a Doctor of Laws (honoris causa) from the University of Tasmania in 2000 for his service to the state and the university.

Field was chairman of the Tasmanian Innovations Advisory Board from its inception in 1999.

On 3 July 2012, Field was announced as the chancellor of the University of Tasmania, with effect from January 2013. He stepped down from the role on 30 June 2021.

Field and his wife, Jan, reside on the Tasman Peninsula, and they have three children: Emma Field, Claire Field and Tom Field.

Field's last election as ALP leader in 1996 saw the entrance to Parliament of popular union leader Jim Bacon, who was touted as a potential ALP leader. When Field retired in 1997, Bacon did not hesitate in succeeding him as leader, and Bacon became premier when he led the party back to power a year later in 1998.

Political offices
Preceded by Neil Batt	Leader of the Opposition in Tasmania; 1988–1989	Succeeded by Robin Gray
Preceded by Robin Gray	Premier of Tasmania; 1989–1992	Succeeded by Ray Groom
Preceded by Ray Groom	Leader of the Opposition in Tasmania; 1992–1997	Succeeded by Jim Bacon
Party political offices
Preceded by Neil Batt	Leader of the Labor Party in Tasmania; 1988–1997	Succeeded by Jim Bacon
Academic offices
Preceded by Damian Bugg	Chancellor of the University of Tasmania; 2013–2021	Succeeded by Alison Watkins
