= 1976 Tasmanian state election =

State election in Australia

- 11 December 1976

All 35 seats to the House of Assembly
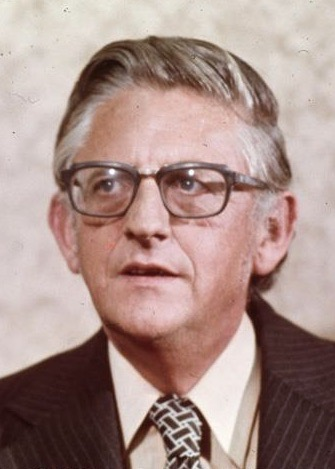

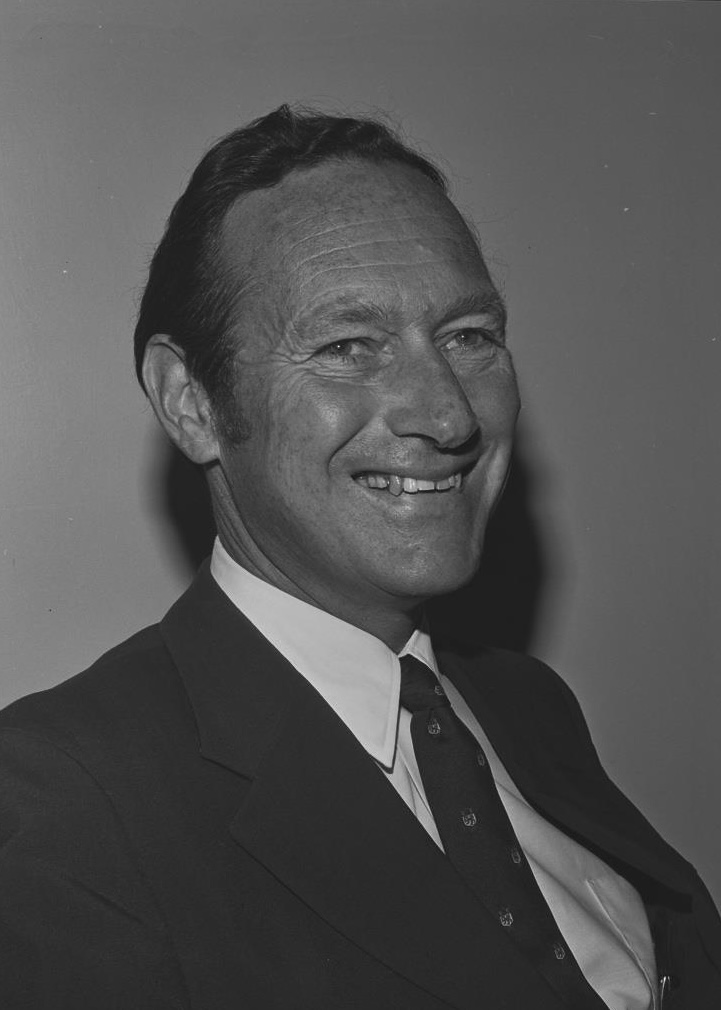
	First party	Second party
Leader	Bill Neilson	Max Bingham
Party	Labor	Liberal
Leader since	31 March 1975	4 May 1972
Leader's seat	Franklin	Denison
Last election	21 seats	14 seats
Seats won	18	17
Seat change	▼3	▲3
Popular vote	123,386	104,613
Percentage	52.48%	44.49%
Swing	▼2.45	▲6.12
- Results of the election
Premier before election
Bill Neilson
Labor
Elected Premier
Bill Neilson
Labor

The 1976 Tasmanian state election was held on 11 December 1976 in the Australian state of Tasmania to elect 35 members of the Tasmanian House of Assembly. The election used the Hare-Clark proportional representation system — seven members were elected from each of five electorates.

The incumbent Labor Party, led by Bill Neilson, won a second term against the opposition Liberal Party, led by Max Bingham.

== Background ==
Labor had won the 1972 election, by a landslide margin of 7 seats, with Labor leader Eric Reece elected as Premier of Tasmania for the second time. Reece retired from Parliament on 31 March 1975, after the ALP introduced a mandatory retirement age of 65. Liberal Party leader Angus Bethune retired three months later, and was replaced by Max Bingham.

== Results ==
Labor won the election, although their majority was reduced to one seat.

Party	Votes	%	+/–	Seats	+/–
Labor	123,386	52.45	-2.45	18	▼3
Liberal	104,613	44.47	+6.12	17	▲3
United Tasmania Group	5,183	2.20	-1.70	0	Steady
Independents	1,424	0.61	-2.19	0	Steady
Workers' Party	524	0.22	New	0	New
Socialist Workers' Party	123	0.05	New	0	New
Total	235,253	100.00	–	35	–
Valid votes	235,253	96.20			
Invalid/blank votes	9,294	3.80	+0.14		
Total votes	244,547	100.00	–		
Registered voters/turnout	258,550	94.58	-0.37		

Popular vote
Labor	52.48%
Liberal	44.49%
United Tasmania Group	2.20%
Workers Party	0.22%
Independents	0.61%

Seats
Labor	51.43%
Liberal	48.57%

== Distribution of votes ==
=== Primary vote by division ===
	Bass	Braddon	Denison	Franklin	Wilmot
Labor Party	48.7%	53.9%	46.8%	59.4%	53.1%
Liberal Party	49.2%	45.9%	46.8%	35.9%	45.0%
Other	2.1%	0.3%	6.5%	4.7%	1.9%

=== Distribution of seats ===
Electorate	Seats won
Bass	
Braddon	
Denison	
Franklin	
Wilmot	

Labor
Liberal

== See also ==
- Members of the Tasmanian House of Assembly, 1976–1979
- Candidates of the 1976 Tasmanian state election
