= Roger Groom =

Australian politician (1936–2024)

Francis Roger Groom (3 November 1936 – 25 August 2024) was an Australian politician.

== Life and career ==
Groom was born in Hobart, Tasmania on 3 November 1936. In 1976, he was elected to the Tasmanian House of Assembly representing Braddon for the Liberal Party. He held his seat until his resignation in 1997, when he was replaced in a countback by Carole Cains. He was a minister from 1982 to 1989 under premier Robin Gray. He had been a minister of Transport, and Health.

Groom died on 25 August 2024, at the age of 87.
