= David Farquhar (politician) =

Australian politician

Hedley David Farquhar (3 March 1927 – 22 June 2009) was an Australian politician.

He was born in Launceston. In 1972 he was elected to the Tasmanian House of Assembly as a Labor member for Bass. He was appointed a minister in 1974, but he lost his seat in 1976.
