= Lloyd Costello =

Australian politician (1922–2001)

The Honourable Lloyd Costello

Member of the Tasmanian House of Assembly for Braddon
- In office 2 May 1959 – 16 May 1975
- Succeeded by: John Coughlan

Personal details
- Born: 10 December 1922 Flowerdale, Tasmania, Australia
- Died: 20 June 2001 (aged 78)
- Party: Labor Party

Military service
- Allegiance: Australia
- Branch/service: Royal Australian Air Force
- Years of service: 1941–1946
- Rank: Corporal

Lloyd Edwin Albert Costello (10 December 1922 – 20 June 2001) was an Australian politician.

He was born in Flowerdale, and served in the Royal Australian Air Force from 1941 to 1946. In 1959 he was elected to the Tasmanian House of Assembly as the Labor member for Braddon. He served as Chair of Committees from 1961 to 1969 and as a minister from 1972 until his resignation from the House in 1975.

Political offices
Preceded by Bill Beattie	Minister for Agriculture and Fisheries; 1972–1975	Succeeded by Eric Barnard
