= Wilfrid Barker =

Australian politician

Wilfrid George Barker CBE (19 June 1907 – 21 January 1988) was an Australian politician.

He was born in Launceston. In 1964 he was elected to the Tasmanian House of Assembly as a Liberal member for Braddon. He held the seat until his retirement in 1976. He was awarded the CBE in 1986.
