= Geoff Chisholm =

Australian politician

The Honourable Geoff Chisholm AM

Member of the Tasmanian House of Assembly for Braddon
- In office 2 May 1964 – 28 July 1979

Personal details
- Born: Geoffrey Donald Chisholm; 8 September 1929 Smithton, Tasmania, Australia
- Died: 13 January 2006 (aged 76) Devonport, Tasmania, Australia
- Party: Labor Party

Geoffrey Donald Chisholm AM (8 September 1929 – 13 January 2006) was an Australian politician.

He was born in Smithton, Tasmania. In 1964, he was elected to the Tasmanian House of Assembly as a Labor member for Braddon. He was Chair of Committees from 1972 to 1974 and a minister from 1974 until his retirement in 1979. He was appointed a Member of the Order of Australia in 1992. His son-in-law, Michael Polley, is also a state Labor politician.

Chisholm died in his sleep, aged 76, at his home in Devonport on 13 January 2006.
