= Allan Foster =

Australian politician (1925–1987)

Allan John Foster (4 September 1925 – 15 January 1987) was an Australian politician

He was born in Scottsdale. In 1969 he was elected to the Tasmanian House of Assembly as a Labor member for Bass. He was appointed a minister in 1972, but resigned in 1974 after being involved in a car accident. He retired from politics in 1976.
