= John Coughlan (politician) =

Australian politician (1934–1991)

John Anthony Coughlan (6 November 1934 – 2 June 1991) was an Australian politician in Tasmania.

He was born in the Melbourne suburb of Chelsea. In 1975 he was elected to the Tasmanian House of Assembly as a Labor member for Braddon in a recount following Lloyd Costello's resignation. He was Chair of Committees from 1977 to 1979 and a minister from 1977 to 1980. In 1986 he was defeated.
