= Doug Lowe (Australian politician) =

Australian politician

The Honourable Doug Lowe AM
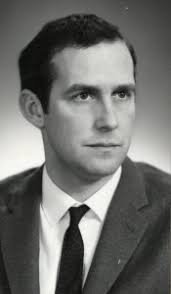

35th Premier of Tasmania
- In office 1 December 1977 – 11 November 1981
- Deputy: Neil Batt; Michael Barnard
- Preceded by: Bill Neilson
- Succeeded by: Harry Holgate

Member of the Tasmanian House of Assembly for Franklin
- In office 10 May 1969 – 8 February 1986

Member of the Tasmanian Legislative Council for Buckingham
- In office 24 May 1986 – 2 May 1992
- Preceded by: Ken Lowrie
- Succeeded by: David Crean

Personal details
- Born: 15 May 1942 (age 84) Hobart, Tasmania, Australia
- Party: Labor (1969–1981); Independent (1981–1992)
- Spouse: Pamela June Grant

Douglas Ackley Lowe AM (born 15 May 1942) was the 35th Premier of Tasmania, from 1 December 1977 to 11 November 1981. His time as Premier coincided with controversy over a proposal to build a dam on Tasmania's Gordon River, which would have flooded parts of the Franklin River. The ensuing crisis saw Lowe overthrown as Premier and resign from the Labor Party, acting as an independent for the remainder of his political career.

Born in Hobart, he was a former electrician by trade. He is married to Pamela June Grant and has four children, two sons and two daughters.

== Early political career ==
Lowe was elected to the Tasmanian House of Assembly representing the electorate of Franklin for the Labor Party on 10 May 1969, at the 1969 state election. He was made a minister in the government of Eric Reece on 3 May 1972, when he became Minister for Housing. In 1975 he became Minister for the Environment and Planning, and was also appointed Deputy Premier. In 1976, he took on the Industrial Relations and Health portfolios. When the then-Premier Bill Neilson resigned as Premier on 1 December 1977, Lowe became Tasmania's 35th Premier.

== Premier of Tasmania ==
At the age of 35 years and 200 days, Lowe was the youngest person ever to become Premier of Tasmania. The first year of his premiership was fairly uneventful, and he retained his seat of Franklin in the 1979 election with the highest ever personal vote in the House of Assembly: 24,971 or 51.2% of the vote (although this was before the Robson Rotation method of printing several variations of ballot papers, so Lowe's vote may have been boosted by his position on the ballot paper).

=== Franklin Dam dispute ===
In 1978, the Hydro-Electric Commission, Tasmania's electricity generator, announced its intention to build a second dam (the Gordon-below-Franklin) on the Gordon River, which given its location would have flooded parts of the environmentally-sensitive Franklin River valley which was joined to the Gordon upstream of the proposed dam site. Noting community concerns over the environmental impact of the proposed dam, Lowe instituted a moratorium on new dam proposals in 1979, and set up the Energy Advisory Council to advise the Cabinet of alternative proposals. The Department of the Environment was instructed to advise the HEC to undertake an environmental impact assessment and report, which when tabled to Parliament recommended proceeding to flood the Franklin. Several alternative proposals were raised: the establishment of a national park on the same site, and a large number of submissions questioning the project and recommending no dam be built at all.

By mid-1980, Tasmania's high levels of unemployment—the highest in the country—were starting to bite economically, and the HEC and elements of the government were adamant that the dam project would alleviate Tasmania's employment and financial problems, although there was considerable public opposition to the dam. Lowe suggested a compromise: the construction of a dam on the Upper Gordon, upstream from the Franklin above the Olga River (Gordon-above-Olga). He also proposed to declare the controversial Lower Gordon area a national park, as suggested by the Department of Parks and Wildlife.

The compromise proposal pleased neither the Hydro-Electric Commission nor the Tasmanian Wilderness Society which was campaigning against the dam. It also caused a deadlock in the Tasmanian Parliament: the House of Assembly rejected the HEC's Lower Gordon (Gordon-below-Franklin) dam, and the Legislative Council rejected the lower house's legislation, and voted against the Upper Gordon (Gordon-above-Olga) dam, insisting they proceed with the original proposal. Lowe, now personally opposed to damming in the region, was successful in the expansion of the existing Frenchmans Cap National Park to include the Franklin, Gordon and Olga Rivers in the Franklin-Gordon Wild Rivers National Park.

=== Referendum and no-confidence motion ===
In an attempt to break the deadlock, the Tasmanian government called a referendum, the Tasmanian power referendum for 12 December 1981. When Lowe announced this to the media, he was asked to clarify if the referendum would include a 'No dams' option, and he indicated it would. The President of the Labor Party in Tasmania, however, wrote to members of parliament and instructed them to withdraw the 'No dams' option, forcing Lowe into a humiliating backdown, and restricting the options to a choice between the two dam proposals.

On 11 November 1981, members of the Labor Party moved a motion of no confidence against Lowe's leadership, petitioning him to resign as Premier and leader of the party, which he did. Harry Holgate was installed as Premier in his place. Instead of joining the backbenches, Lowe resigned from the ALP and joined the cross-benches as an Independent.

== Legislative Council ==
Lowe continued to serve in the House of Assembly as an Independent and was reelected in the 1982 state election, until he retired on 8 February 1986. Shortly afterwards, however, he successfully ran for the Legislative Council representing the electoral district of Buckingham from 24 May 1986 to 2 May 1992 when he retired from politics.

== After politics ==
After leaving politics, Lowe became executive director of the Tasmanian branch of the Australian Medical Association. In 2005, he was temporarily contracted by the state government to secure more specialist staff for the Royal Hobart Hospital.

== Honours ==
Lowe was made a Member of the Order of Australia in the Queen's Birthday Honours in 2000, for service to the community of Tasmania, particularly in the area of social welfare, to the development of health policy, and to the Tasmanian Parliament. He was also awarded a Centenary Medal in 2001.

Political offices
Preceded by Bill Neilson	Premier of Tasmania; 1977–1981	Succeeded by Harry Holgate
Party political offices
Preceded by Bill Neilson	Leader of the Labor Party in Tasmania; 1977–1981	Succeeded by Harry Holgate
Tasmanian Legislative Council
Preceded by Ken Lowrie	Member for Buckingham; 1986–1992	Succeeded by David Crean
