= Joseph Britton (politician) =

Australian politician

Joseph James Britton (18 February 1911 – 28 March 1995) was an Australian politician.

He was born in Launceston. In 1959 he was elected to the Tasmanian House of Assembly as a Labor member for Braddon. He was defeated in 1964. After unsuccessfully running in 1972, he was elected in a countback in 1975 following Eric Reece's resignation. He retired the following year.
