= Glen Davies (politician) =

Australian politician (1943–2003)

Ronald Glen Davies (5 August 1943 – 4 April 2003) was an Australian politician.

He was born in Franklin, Tasmania, the son of federal MP Ron Davies. In 1972 he was elected to the Tasmanian House of Assembly as a Labor member for Braddon. He was Speaker from 1977 to 1979 and from 1980 to 1982. He retired from politics in 1986, and died in Queensland in 2003.
