= Electoral results for the Division of Clark (state, 1972-present) =

This is a list of electoral results for the division of Clark and Denison in Tasmanian elections since 1972.

== Election results ==
=== Elections in the 2020s ===
==== 2025 ====

2025 Tasmanian state election: Clark
| Party | Candidate | Votes | % | ±% |
|---|---|---|---|---|
| Quota | | 8,006 | | |
| Liberal | Marcus Vermey (elected 6) | 5,870 | 9.2 | +3.7 |
| Liberal | Simon Behrakis | 5,122 | 8.0 | −0.1 |
| Liberal | Madeleine Ogilvie (elected 7) | 4,452 | 7.0 | −0.3 |
| Liberal | Marilena di Florio | 1,372 | 2.1 | +2.1 |
| Liberal | Jessica Barnett | 1,154 | 1.8 | +1.8 |
| Liberal | Edwin Johnstone | 1,007 | 1.6 | +1.6 |
| Liberal | David Wan | 647 | 1.0 | +1.0 |
| Labor | Ella Haddad (elected 3) | 5,627 | 8.8 | −2.1 |
| Labor | Josh Willie (elected 4) | 5,552 | 8.7 | −0.2 |
| Labor | Luke Martin | 1,997 | 3.1 | +3.1 |
| Labor | John Kamara | 1,826 | 2.9 | +0.2 |
| Labor | Tessa McLaughlin | 898 | 1.4 | +1.4 |
| Labor | Liam McLaren | 793 | 1.2 | +1.2 |
| Labor | Craig Shirley | 605 | 0.9 | +0.9 |
| Greens | Vica Bayley (elected 2) | 5,793 | 9.0 | −0.9 |
| Greens | Helen Burnet (elected 5) | 4,469 | 7.0 | +1.6 |
| Greens | Janet Shelley | 1,250 | 2.0 | +0.3 |
| Greens | Peter Jones | 898 | 1.4 | +0.1 |
| Greens | Nathan Volf | 657 | 1.0 | 0.0 |
| Greens | Angus Templeton | 542 | 0.9 | +0.9 |
| Greens | Pat Caruana | 518 | 0.8 | +0.8 |
| Independent | Kristie Johnston (elected 1) | 9,629 | 15.0 | +7.3 |
| Independent | Elise Archer | 2,141 | 3.3 | +3.3 |
| Independent | Steven Phipps | 564 | 0.9 | +0.9 |
| Independent | Jags Goldsmith | 359 | 0.6 | +0.6 |
| Independent | John MacGowan | 300 | 0.5 | +0.5 |
| Total formal votes | | 64,042 | 95.4 | +0.8 |
| Informal votes | | 3,115 | 4.6 | −0.8 |
| Turnout | | 67,157 | 90.3 | −0.3 |
Party total votes
| Liberal | | 19,624 | 30.6 | +3.5 |
| Labor | | 17,298 | 27.0 | -3.5 |
| Greens | | 14,127 | 22.0 | +1.1 |
| Independent | Kristie Johnston | 9,629 | 15.0 | +7.3 |
| Independent | Elise Archer | 2,141 | 3.3 | +3.3 |
| Independent | Steven Phipps | 564 | 0.9 | +0.9 |
| Independent | Jags Goldsmith | 359 | 0.6 | +0.6 |
| Independent | John MacGowan | 300 | 0.5 | +0.5 |

==== 2024 ====
2024 Tasmanian state election: Clark
| Party | Candidate | Votes | % | ±% |
|---|---|---|---|---|
| Quota | | 7,951 | | |
| Labor | Ella Haddad (elected 1) | 6,944 | 10.9 | −1.6 |
| Labor | Josh Willie (elected 3) | 5,670 | 8.9 | +8.9 |
| Labor | Stuart Benson | 1,929 | 3.0 | +3.0 |
| Labor | John Kamara | 1,689 | 2.7 | +2.7 |
| Labor | Rebecca Prince | 1,441 | 2.3 | +2.3 |
| Labor | Simon Davis | 852 | 1.3 | −1.8 |
| Labor | Susan Wallace | 850 | 1.3 | +1.3 |
| Liberal | Simon Behrakis (elected 6) | 5,168 | 8.1 | +2.3 |
| Liberal | Madeleine Ogilvie (elected 7) | 4,623 | 7.3 | +1.0 |
| Liberal | Marcus Vermey | 3,513 | 5.5 | +5.5 |
| Liberal | Jon Gourlay | 1,434 | 2.3 | +2.3 |
| Liberal | Mohammad Aldergham | 878 | 1.4 | +1.4 |
| Liberal | Catherine Searle | 828 | 1.3 | +1.3 |
| Liberal | Emma Atterbury | 800 | 1.3 | +1.3 |
| Greens | Vica Bayley (elected 2) | 6,313 | 9.9 | +7.8 |
| Greens | Helen Burnet (elected 5) | 3,422 | 5.4 | +5.4 |
| Greens | Janet Shelley | 1,076 | 1.7 | +1.7 |
| Greens | Peter Jones | 821 | 1.3 | +1.3 |
| Greens | Nathan Volf | 629 | 1.0 | +0.3 |
| Greens | Trenton Hoare | 545 | 0.9 | +0.9 |
| Greens | James Zalotockyj | 459 | 0.7 | +0.7 |
| Independent | Kristie Johnston (elected 4) | 4,925 | 7.7 | −3.2 |
| Independent | Sue Hickey | 3,117 | 4.9 | −4.9 |
| Independent | Ben Lohberger | 1,702 | 2.7 | +2.7 |
| Independent | Louise Elliot | 1,160 | 1.8 | +1.8 |
| Animal Justice | Casey Davies | 1,088 | 1.7 | +1.7 |
| Shooters, Fishers, Farmers | Adrian Pickin | 521 | 0.8 | +0.8 |
| Shooters, Fishers, Farmers | Lorraine Bennett | 408 | 0.6 | +0.2 |
| Local Network | David Nunn | 147 | 0.2 | +0.2 |
| Local Network | Frank Formby | 129 | 0.2 | +0.2 |
| Local Network | Sam Campbell | 112 | 0.2 | +0.2 |
| Local Network | Ranae Zollner | 88 | 0.1 | +0.1 |
| Independent | Stefan Vogel | 162 | 0.3 | +0.3 |
| Independent | Angela Triffitt | 90 | 0.1 | +0.1 |
| Independent | John Michael Forster | 70 | 0.1 | +0.1 |
| Total formal votes | | 63,603 | 94.6 | −0.4 |
| Informal votes | | 3,655 | 5.4 | +0.4 |
| Turnout | | 67,258 | 90.6 | −0.1 |
Party total votes
| Labor | | 19,375 | 30.5 | +8.4 |
| Liberal | | 17,244 | 27.1 | −4.7 |
| Greens | | 13,265 | 20.9 | +0.8 |
| Independent | Kristie Johnston | 4,925 | 7.7 | −3.2 |
| Independent | Sue Hickey | 3,117 | 4.9 | −4.9 |
| Independent | Ben Lohberger | 1,702 | 2.7 | +2.7 |
| Independent | Louise Elliot | 1,160 | 1.8 | +1.8 |
| Animal Justice | | 1,088 | 1.7 | +1.7 |
| Shooters, Fishers, Farmers | | 929 | 1.5 | +0.1 |
| Local Network | | 476 | 0.7 | +0.7 |
| Independent | Stefan Vogel | 162 | 0.3 | +0.3 |
| Independent | Angela Triffitt | 90 | 0.1 | +0.1 |
| Independent | John Michael Forster | 70 | 0.1 | +0.1 |

==== 2021 ====
2021 Tasmanian state election: Clark
| Party | Candidate | Votes | % | ±% |
|---|---|---|---|---|
| Quota | | 10,626 | | |
| Liberal | Elise Archer (elected 2) | 9,402 | 14.7 | −1.6 |
| Liberal | Madeleine Ogilvie (elected 4) | 3,992 | 6.3 | +6.3 |
| Liberal | Simon Behrakis | 3,722 | 5.8 | +2.3 |
| Liberal | Will Coats | 1,690 | 2.7 | +2.7 |
| Liberal | Harvey Lennon | 1,488 | 2.3 | +2.3 |
| Labor | Ella Haddad (elected 3) | 7,998 | 12.5 | +4.4 |
| Labor | Simon Davis | 1,986 | 3.1 | +3.1 |
| Labor | Chris Clark | 1,597 | 2.5 | +2.5 |
| Labor | Sam Mitchell | 1,294 | 2.0 | +2.0 |
| Labor | Deb Carnes | 1,191 | 1.9 | +1.9 |
| Greens | Cassy O'Connor (elected 1) | 9,469 | 14.9 | +2.4 |
| Greens | Vica Bayley | 1,372 | 2.2 | +2.2 |
| Greens | Bec Taylor | 943 | 1.5 | +1.5 |
| Greens | Tim Smith | 546 | 0.9 | +0.9 |
| Greens | Nathan Volf | 442 | 0.7 | +0.7 |
| Independent | Kristie Johnston (elected 5) | 6,994 | 11.0 | +11.0 |
| Independent | Sue Hickey | 6,261 | 9.8 | +9.8 |
| Animal Justice | Tim Westcott | 902 | 1.4 | +1.4 |
| Shooters, Fishers, Farmers | Andrew Large | 588 | 0.9 | +0.9 |
| Shooters, Fishers, Farmers | Lorraine Bennett | 310 | 0.5 | +0.5 |
| Independent | Mike Dutta | 615 | 1.0 | +1.0 |
| Independent | Jax Ewin | 537 | 0.8 | +0.8 |
| Independent | Lisa Gershwin | 260 | 0.4 | +0.4 |
| Federation | Justin Stringer | 154 | 0.2 | +0.2 |
| Total formal votes | | 63,753 | 95.0 | −0.9 |
| Informal votes | | 3,378 | 5.0 | +0.9 |
| Turnout | | 67,131 | 90.7 | −0.7 |
Party total votes
| Liberal | | 20,294 | 31.8 | −5.9 |
| Labor | | 14,066 | 22.1 | −19.8 |
| Greens | | 12,772 | 20.0 | +2.5 |
| Independent | Kristie Johnston | 6,994 | 11.0 | +11.0 |
| Independent | Sue Hickey | 6,261 | 9.8 | +9.8 |
| Animal Justice | | 902 | 1.4 | +1.4 |
| Shooters, Fishers, Farmers | | 898 | 1.4 | +1.4 |
| Independent | Mike Dutta | 615 | 1.0 | +1.0 |
| Independent | Jax Ewin | 537 | 0.8 | +0.8 |
| Independent | Lisa Gershwin | 260 | 0.4 | +0.4 |
| Federation | | 154 | 0.2 | +0.2 |
| Liberal hold | | Swing | –1.6 | |
| Liberal hold | | Swing | +6.3 | |
| Labor hold | | Swing | +4.4 | |
| Greens hold | | Swing | +2.4 | |
| Independent gain from Labor | | Swing | +11.0 | |

=== Elections in the 2010s ===
==== 2018 ====
2018 Tasmanian state election: Denison
| Party | Candidate | Votes | % | ±% |
|---|---|---|---|---|
| Quota | | 10,866 | | |
| Labor | Scott Bacon (elected 1) | 11,798 | 18.1 | −4.5 |
| Labor | Ella Haddad (elected 5) | 5,288 | 8.1 | +8.1 |
| Labor | Madeleine Ogilvie | 4,340 | 6.7 | +3.3 |
| Labor | Tim Cox | 3,860 | 5.9 | +5.9 |
| Labor | Zelinda Sherlock | 1,998 | 3.1 | +3.1 |
| Liberal | Elise Archer (elected 2) | 10,627 | 16.3 | +5.8 |
| Liberal | Sue Hickey (elected 4) | 7,142 | 11.0 | +11.0 |
| Liberal | Kristy Johnson | 3,234 | 5.0 | +5.0 |
| Liberal | Simon Behrakis | 2,317 | 3.6 | +3.6 |
| Liberal | Dean Young | 1,260 | 1.9 | +1.9 |
| Greens | Cassy O'Connor (elected 3) | 8,095 | 12.4 | −2.7 |
| Greens | Helen Burnet | 1,532 | 2.4 | +2.4 |
| Greens | Mel Fitzpatrick | 733 | 1.1 | +1.1 |
| Greens | Rose Kokkoris | 603 | 0.9 | +0.9 |
| Greens | Aaron Benham | 465 | 0.7 | +0.7 |
| Shooters, Fishers, Farmers | Lorraine Bennett | 1,190 | 1.8 | +1.8 |
| Tasmanians 4 Tasmania | Rob Newitt | 362 | 0.6 | +0.6 |
| Tasmanians 4 Tasmania | Alan Barnett | 347 | 0.5 | +0.5 |
| Total formal votes | | 65,191 | 95.8 | +0.6 |
| Informal votes | | 2,835 | 4.2 | −0.6 |
| Turnout | | 68,026 | 91.4 | −1.3 |
Party total votes
| Labor | | 27,284 | 41.9 | +8.1 |
| Liberal | | 24,580 | 37.7 | −0.6 |
| Greens | | 11,428 | 17.5 | −3.7 |
| Shooters, Fishers, Farmers | | 1,190 | 1.8 | +1.8 |
| Tasmanians 4 Tasmania | | 709 | 1.1 | +1.1 |
| Labor hold | | Swing | –4.5 | |
| Labor hold | | Swing | +8.1 | |
| Liberal hold | | Swing | +5.8 | |
| Liberal hold | | Swing | +11.0 | |
| Greens hold | | Swing | –2.7 | |

==== 2014 ====
2014 Tasmanian state election: Denison
| Party | Candidate | Votes | % | ±% |
|---|---|---|---|---|
| Quota | | 10,660 | | |
| Liberal | Matthew Groom (elected 2) | 13,829 | 21.6 | +6.5 |
| Liberal | Elise Archer (elected 4) | 6,701 | 10.5 | +5.8 |
| Liberal | Robert Mallett | 2,080 | 3.3 | +3.3 |
| Liberal | Deborah De Williams | 1,052 | 1.6 | +1.6 |
| Liberal | René Kling | 823 | 1.3 | +1.3 |
| Labor | Scott Bacon (elected 1) | 14,469 | 22.6 | +11.1 |
| Labor | Madeleine Ogilvie (elected 5) | 2,156 | 3.4 | +2.4 |
| Labor | Julian Amos | 1,917 | 3.0 | +3.0 |
| Labor | Alphonse Mulumba | 1,587 | 2.5 | +2.5 |
| Labor | Sharon Carnes | 1,482 | 2.3 | +2.3 |
| Greens | Cassy O'Connor (elected 3) | 9,694 | 15.2 | −1.0 |
| Greens | Bill Harvey | 1,614 | 2.5 | +2.5 |
| Greens | Penelope Ann | 934 | 1.5 | +0.2 |
| Greens | Philip Cocker | 695 | 1.1 | +1.1 |
| Greens | Alan Whykes | 615 | 1.0 | +1.0 |
| Palmer United | Barbara Etter | 737 | 1.2 | +1.2 |
| Palmer United | Rob Newitt | 369 | 0.6 | +0.6 |
| Palmer United | Justin Stringer | 357 | 0.6 | +0.6 |
| Palmer United | Charles Forrest | 303 | 0.5 | +0.5 |
| Palmer United | Mark Grube | 254 | 0.4 | +0.4 |
| Independent | Marti Zucco | 788 | 1.2 | +1.2 |
| Independent | Hans Willink | 413 | 0.6 | +0.6 |
| Socialist Alliance | Shaine Stephen | 300 | 0.5 | +0.5 |
| Independent | Leo Foley | 207 | 0.3 | +0.3 |
| National | Vlad Gala | 75 | 0.1 | +0.1 |
| National | Julian Edwards | 61 | 0.1 | +0.1 |
| National | Domenic Allocca | 48 | 0.1 | +0.1 |
| Independent | Freddy Hill | 152 | 0.2 | +0.2 |
| Independent | Lucas Noyes | 130 | 0.2 | +0.2 |
| Independent | Michael Swanton | 114 | 0.2 | +0.2 |
| Total formal votes | | 63,956 | 95.2 | −1.0 |
| Informal votes | | 3,218 | 4.8 | +1.0 |
| Turnout | | 67,174 | 92.7 | −0.3 |
Party total votes
| Liberal | | 24,485 | 38.3 | +8.5 |
| Labor | | 21,611 | 33.8 | −2.5 |
| Greens | | 13,552 | 21.2 | −3.7 |
| Palmer United | | 2,020 | 3.2 | +3.2 |
| Independent | Marti Zucco | 788 | 1.2 | +1.2 |
| Independent | Hans Willink | 413 | 0.6 | +0.6 |
| Socialist Alliance | | 300 | 0.5 | −0.1 |
| Independent | Leo Foley | 207 | 0.3 | +0.3 |
| National | | 184 | 0.3 | +0.3 |
| Independent | Freddy Hill | 152 | 0.2 | +0.2 |
| Independent | Lucas Noyes | 130 | 0.2 | +0.2 |
| Independent | Michael Swanton | 114 | 0.2 | +0.2 |
| Liberal hold | | Swing | +6.5 | |
| Liberal hold | | Swing | +5.8 | |
| Labor hold | | Swing | +11.1 | |
| Labor hold | | Swing | +2.4 | |
| Greens hold | | Swing | –1.0 | |

==== 2010 ====
2010 Tasmanian state election: Denison
| Party | Candidate | Votes | % | ±% |
|---|---|---|---|---|
| Quota | | 10,630 | | |
| Labor | David Bartlett (elected 2) | 10,169 | 15.9 | +2.9 |
| Labor | Scott Bacon (elected 4) | 7,356 | 11.5 | +11.5 |
| Labor | Lisa Singh | 3,833 | 6.0 | −3.4 |
| Labor | Graeme Sturges | 1,185 | 1.9 | −7.7 |
| Labor | Madeleine Ogilvie | 608 | 1.0 | +1.0 |
| Liberal | Matthew Groom (elected 3) | 9,602 | 15.1 | +15.1 |
| Liberal | Richard Lowrie | 3,138 | 4.9 | +1.3 |
| Liberal | Elise Archer (elected 5) | 2,999 | 4.7 | +1.5 |
| Liberal | Matt Stevenson | 1,834 | 2.9 | +2.9 |
| Liberal | Jenny Branch | 1,428 | 2.2 | +2.2 |
| Greens | Cassy O'Connor (elected 1) | 10,336 | 16.2 | +12.3 |
| Greens | Helen Burnet | 3,142 | 4.9 | +4.9 |
| Greens | Peter Cover | 875 | 1.4 | +1.4 |
| Greens | Penelope Ann | 811 | 1.3 | +1.3 |
| Greens | Kartika Franks | 713 | 1.1 | +1.1 |
| Independent | Andrew Wilkie | 5,382 | 8.4 | +8.4 |
| Socialist Alliance | Melanie Barnes | 365 | 0.6 | +0.6 |
| Total formal votes | | 63,776 | 96.2 | +0.5 |
| Informal votes | | 2,541 | 3.8 | −0.5 |
| Turnout | | 66,317 | 93.0 | +0.7 |
Party total votes
| Labor | | 23,151 | 36.3 | −10.5 |
| Liberal | | 19,001 | 29.8 | +3.1 |
| Greens | | 15,877 | 24.9 | +0.8 |
| Independent | Andrew Wilkie | 5,382 | 8.4 | +8.4 |
| Socialist Alliance | | 365 | 0.6 | +0.2 |

=== Elections in the 2000s ===
==== 2006 ====
2006 Tasmanian state election: Denison
| Party | Candidate | Votes | % | ±% |
|---|---|---|---|---|
| Quota | | 10,257 | | |
| Labor | David Bartlett (elected 3) | 7,982 | 13.0 | +8.7 |
| Labor | Graeme Sturges (elected 5) | 5,922 | 9.6 | +4.9 |
| Labor | Lisa Singh (elected 4) | 5,760 | 9.4 | +9.4 |
| Labor | Louise Sullivan | 4,067 | 6.6 | +6.6 |
| Labor | Julie Collins | 3,703 | 6.0 | +6.0 |
| Labor | Joe Ritchie | 1,449 | 2.4 | +2.4 |
| Liberal | Michael Hodgman (elected 2) | 7,436 | 12.1 | +5.1 |
| Liberal | Fabian Dixon | 3,596 | 5.8 | +5.8 |
| Liberal | Richard Lowrie | 2,239 | 3.6 | +3.6 |
| Liberal | Elise Archer | 1,939 | 3.2 | +3.2 |
| Liberal | John Klonaris | 1,130 | 1.8 | +1.8 |
| Greens | Peg Putt (elected 1) | 11,338 | 18.4 | −1.6 |
| Greens | Cassy O'Connor | 2,426 | 3.9 | +3.9 |
| Greens | Marrette Corby | 371 | 0.6 | +0.6 |
| Greens | Bill Harvey | 364 | 0.6 | +0.6 |
| Greens | Toby Rowallan | 313 | 0.5 | +0.5 |
| Group F | Michael Fracalossi | 309 | 0.5 | +0.5 |
| Group F | Paul Glover | 89 | 0.1 | +0.1 |
| Group F | Ken Higgs | 43 | 0.1 | +0.1 |
| Tasmania First | Kevin Pelham | 190 | 0.3 | +0.3 |
| Tasmania First | Eric Zeppenfeld | 135 | 0.2 | +0.2 |
| Independent | Leo Foley | 271 | 0.4 | +0.4 |
| Socialist Alliance | Linda Seaborn | 237 | 0.4 | +0.4 |
| Independent | Hugh Miller | 229 | 0.4 | +0.4 |
| Total formal votes | | 61,538 | 95.7 | 0.0 |
| Informal votes | | 2,747 | 4.3 | 0.0 |
| Turnout | | 64,285 | 94.2 | +1.6 |
Party total votes
| Labor | | 28,883 | 47.0 | −3.9 |
| Liberal | | 16,340 | 26.5 | +3.6 |
| Greens | | 14,812 | 24.0 | −0.4 |
| Group F | | 441 | 0.7 | +0.7 |
| Tasmania First | | 325 | 0.5 | +0.5 |
| Independent | Leo Foley | 271 | 0.4 | +0.4 |
| Socialist Alliance | | 237 | 0.4 | +0.4 |
| Independent | Hugh Miller | 229 | 0.4 | +0.4 |

==== 2002 ====
2002 Tasmanian state election: Denison
| Party | Candidate | Votes | % | ±% |
|---|---|---|---|---|
| Quota | | 10,040 | | |
| Labor | Jim Bacon (elected 1) | 21,391 | 35.5 | +3.7 |
| Labor | Graeme Sturges (elected 5) | 2,849 | 4.7 | +4.7 |
| Labor | David Bartlett | 2,554 | 4.2 | +4.2 |
| Labor | James Crotty | 2,281 | 3.8 | +3.8 |
| Labor | Judy Jackson (elected 4) | 1,551 | 2.6 | −2.4 |
| Greens | Peg Putt (elected 2) | 12,036 | 20.0 | +9.5 |
| Greens | Jo Hall | 720 | 1.2 | +1.2 |
| Greens | Mat Hines | 710 | 1.2 | +1.2 |
| Greens | Tim Graham | 651 | 1.1 | +1.1 |
| Greens | Cath Hughes | 643 | 1.1 | +1.1 |
| Liberal | Bob Cheek | 4,622 | 7.7 | −5.2 |
| Liberal | Michael Hodgman (elected 3) | 4,205 | 7.0 | 0.0 |
| Liberal | Jan Kuplis | 1,925 | 3.2 | +3.2 |
| Liberal | Steve Mav | 1,863 | 3.1 | +3.1 |
| Liberal | Tony Steven | 811 | 1.3 | +1.3 |
| Liberal | Matt Woolnough | 396 | 0.7 | +0.7 |
| Group E | Frank Nicklason | 462 | 0.8 | +0.8 |
| Group E | Steve Poulton | 143 | 0.2 | +0.2 |
| Socialist Alliance | Alex Bainbridge | 224 | 0.4 | +0.4 |
| Socialist Alliance | Shua Garfield | 178 | 0.3 | +0.3 |
| Total formal votes | | 60,235 | 95.7 | −0.6 |
| Informal votes | | 2,724 | 4.3 | +0.6 |
| Turnout | | 62,959 | 92.6 | −1.2 |
Party total votes
| Labor | | 30,626 | 50.8 | +4.5 |
| Greens | | 14,760 | 24.5 | +11.4 |
| Liberal | | 13,822 | 22.9 | −13.3 |
| Group E | | 605 | 1.0 | +1.0 |
| Socialist Alliance | | 422 | 0.7 | +0.7 |

=== Elections in the 1990s ===
==== 1998 ====
1998 Tasmanian state election: Denison
| Party | Candidate | Votes | % | ±% |
|---|---|---|---|---|
| Quota | | 9,899 | | |
| Labor | Jim Bacon (elected 1) | 18,901 | 31.8 | +17.1 |
| Labor | Judy Jackson (elected 2) | 2,968 | 5.0 | −1.5 |
| Labor | Gwynn Mac Carrick | 1,854 | 3.1 | +3.1 |
| Labor | Andy Bennett | 1,281 | 2.2 | +2.2 |
| Labor | Stuart Slade | 1,093 | 1.8 | +0.1 |
| Labor | Luigi Bini | 797 | 1.3 | +1.3 |
| Labor | Deb Carnes | 608 | 1.0 | +1.0 |
| Liberal | Bob Cheek (elected 3) | 7,652 | 12.9 | +6.3 |
| Liberal | Ray Groom (elected 4) | 6,430 | 10.8 | −5.4 |
| Liberal | Michael Hodgman | 4,141 | 7.0 | +0.3 |
| Liberal | John Remess | 2,843 | 4.8 | +4.8 |
| Liberal | Steven Mavrigiannakis | 435 | 0.7 | +0.7 |
| Greens | Peg Putt (elected 5) | 6,263 | 10.5 | +0.9 |
| Greens | Dick Friend | 462 | 0.8 | −1.2 |
| Greens | Trish Moran | 460 | 0.8 | +0.3 |
| Greens | Simon Baptist | 306 | 0.5 | +0.5 |
| Greens | Mat Hines | 298 | 0.5 | +0.5 |
| Tasmania First | John Presser | 464 | 0.8 | +0.8 |
| Tasmania First | Geoff Churchill | 303 | 0.5 | +0.5 |
| Tasmania First | Frank Hesman | 223 | 0.4 | +0.4 |
| Tasmania First | Inez McCarthy | 192 | 0.3 | +0.3 |
| Tasmania First | Barbara Woods | 187 | 0.3 | +0.3 |
| Democrats | Chris Ivory | 354 | 0.6 | +0.6 |
| Democrats | Brent Blackburn | 345 | 0.6 | +0.6 |
| Independent | Bob Elliston | 186 | 0.3 | +0.3 |
| Independent | Informal | 103 | 0.2 | −0.3 |
| Group B | Jenny Forward | 65 | 0.1 | +0.1 |
| Group B | Mathew Munro | 37 | 0.1 | +0.1 |
| Independent | Matthew D. Piscioneri | 56 | 0.1 | +0.1 |
| Independent | Bob Campbell | 44 | 0.1 | +0.1 |
| Independent | Gregory Broszczyk | 39 | 0.1 | +0.1 |
| Total formal votes | | 59,390 | 96.3 | +1.5 |
| Informal votes | | 2,310 | 3.7 | −1.5 |
| Turnout | | 61,700 | 93.8 | −1.4 |
Party total votes
| Labor | | 27,502 | 46.3 | +0.9 |
| Liberal | | 21,501 | 36.2 | +0.8 |
| Greens | | 7,789 | 13.1 | −0.9 |
| Tasmania First | | 1,369 | 2.3 | +2.3 |
| Democrats | | 699 | 1.2 | +1.2 |
| Independent | Bob Elliston | 186 | 0.3 | +0.3 |
| Independent | Informal | 103 | 0.2 | −0.3 |
| Group B | | 102 | 0.2 | +0.2 |
| Independent | Matthew D. Piscioneri | 56 | 0.1 | +0.1 |
| Independent | Bob Campbell | 44 | 0.1 | +0.1 |
| Independent | Gregory Broszczyk | 39 | 0.1 | +0.1 |

==== 1996 ====
1996 Tasmanian state election: Denison
| Party | Candidate | Votes | % | ±% |
|---|---|---|---|---|
| Quota | | 7,453 | | |
| Labor | Jim Bacon (elected 2) | 8,766 | 14.7 | +14.7 |
| Labor | John White (elected 3) | 6,809 | 11.4 | +2.9 |
| Labor | Judy Jackson (elected 6) | 3,858 | 6.5 | −3.2 |
| Labor | Julian Amos | 3,721 | 6.2 | +0.5 |
| Labor | Cora Trevarthen | 1,541 | 2.6 | +2.6 |
| Labor | Stuart Slade | 1,038 | 1.7 | +1.7 |
| Labor | Pam Wright | 888 | 1.5 | +1.5 |
| Labor | Bob Riep | 424 | 0.7 | +0.7 |
| Liberal | Ray Groom (elected 1) | 9,637 | 16.2 | −10.6 |
| Liberal | Michael Hodgman (elected 7) | 3,994 | 6.7 | −5.5 |
| Liberal | Bob Cheek (elected 5) | 3,946 | 6.6 | +6.6 |
| Liberal | Jane Goodluck | 1,922 | 3.2 | +3.2 |
| Liberal | John Barker | 998 | 1.7 | +0.1 |
| Liberal | Nell Ames | 429 | 0.7 | +0.7 |
| Liberal | Hans Willink | 207 | 0.3 | +0.3 |
| Greens | Peg Putt (elected 4) | 5,738 | 9.6 | +7.8 |
| Greens | Dick Friend | 1,211 | 2.0 | +2.0 |
| Greens | Ann Wessing | 308 | 0.5 | +0.5 |
| Greens | Kath Hughes | 299 | 0.5 | +0.5 |
| Greens | Trish Moran | 277 | 0.5 | +0.5 |
| Greens | Peter Jones | 272 | 0.5 | +0.5 |
| Greens | Margie Law | 258 | 0.4 | +0.4 |
| National | Kevin Pelham | 462 | 0.8 | +0.8 |
| National | Ian Coggins | 292 | 0.5 | +0.5 |
| Extremely Greedy 40% | Chris Kelly | 435 | 0.7 | +0.7 |
| Extremely Greedy 40% | Jenny Sheridan | 267 | 0.4 | +0.4 |
| Independent | Austra Maddox | 698 | 1.2 | +1.2 |
| Group F | Jeff Briscoe | 551 | 0.9 | +0.9 |
| Group F | Sharon Howett | 35 | 0.1 | +0.1 |
| Group D | Informal | 285 | 0.5 | +0.5 |
| Group D | Janet Locke | 52 | 0.1 | +0.1 |
| Total formal votes | | 59,618 | 94.8 | +0.8 |
| Informal votes | | 3,240 | 5.2 | −0.8 |
| Turnout | | 62,858 | 95.2 | +1.7 |
Party total votes
| Labor | | 27,045 | 45.4 | +12.1 |
| Liberal | | 21,333 | 35.4 | −8.5 |
| Greens | | 8,363 | 14.0 | −3.9 |
| National | | 754 | 1.3 | +1.3 |
| Extremely Greedy 40% | | 702 | 1.2 | +1.2 |
| Independent | Austra Maddox | 698 | 1.2 | +1.2 |
| Group F | | 586 | 1.0 | +1.0 |
| Group D | | 337 | 0.6 | +0.6 |

==== 1992 ====
1992 Tasmanian state election: Denison
| Party | Candidate | Votes | % | ±% |
|---|---|---|---|---|
| Quota | | 6,839 | | |
| Liberal | Ray Groom (elected 1) | 14,654 | 26.8 | +8.8 |
| Liberal | Michael Hodgman (elected 3) | 6,654 | 12.2 | +12.2 |
| Liberal | John Barker (elected 5) | 858 | 1.6 | −1.1 |
| Liberal | Joy Cairns | 822 | 1.5 | +1.5 |
| Liberal | Peter Dobromilsky | 377 | 0.7 | +0.7 |
| Liberal | Ingrid Wren | 346 | 0.6 | +0.6 |
| Liberal | Chris Gibson | 332 | 0.6 | −0.3 |
| Labor | Judy Jackson (elected 4) | 5,310 | 9.7 | +2.4 |
| Labor | John White (elected 6) | 4,648 | 8.5 | +0.3 |
| Labor | David Crean | 3,176 | 5.8 | −1.8 |
| Labor | Julian Amos (elected 7) | 3,142 | 5.7 | +5.7 |
| Labor | Charles Touber | 1,030 | 1.9 | −0.8 |
| Labor | Andrew Daniels | 640 | 1.2 | −1.3 |
| Labor | Rosalind Escott | 267 | 0.5 | +0.5 |
| Independent Greens | Bob Brown (elected 2) | 8,255 | 15.1 | −6.6 |
| Independent Greens | Peg Putt | 958 | 1.8 | +1.8 |
| Independent Greens | Rob Valentine | 210 | 0.4 | +0.4 |
| Independent Greens | Karen Weldrick | 137 | 0.3 | +0.3 |
| Independent Greens | Mary Jenkins | 101 | 0.2 | +0.2 |
| Independent Greens | Stuart Baird | 89 | 0.2 | +0.2 |
| Independent Greens | Dave Heatley | 66 | 0.1 | +0.1 |
| Advance Tasmania | Hank Petrusma | 1,928 | 3.5 | +3.5 |
| Advance Tasmania | Ruth Butler | 90 | 0.2 | +0.2 |
| More Jobs | Brian Sampson | 201 | 0.4 | +0.4 |
| More Jobs | Gordon Dunsby | 155 | 0.3 | +0.3 |
| Independent | Ken Harvey | 111 | 0.2 | +0.2 |
| Independent | Mary Guy | 104 | 0.2 | +0.2 |
| Independent | Doug Fenton | 46 | 0.1 | +0.1 |
| Total formal votes | | 54,707 | 95.6 | +0.4 |
| Informal votes | | 2,508 | 4.4 | −0.4 |
| Turnout | | 57,215 | 93.5 | +2.1 |
Party total votes
| Liberal | | 24,043 | 43.9 | +5.5 |
| Labor | | 18,213 | 33.3 | −3.6 |
| Independent Greens | | 9,816 | 17.9 | −5.6 |
| Advance Tasmania | | 2,018 | 3.7 | +3.7 |
| More Jobs | | 356 | 0.7 | +0.7 |
| Independent | Ken Harvey | 111 | 0.2 | +0.2 |
| Independent | Mary Guy | 104 | 0.2 | +0.2 |
| Independent | Doug Fenton | 46 | 0.1 | +0.1 |

=== Elections in the 1980s ===
==== 1989 ====
1989 Tasmanian state election: Denison
| Party | Candidate | Votes | % | ±% |
|---|---|---|---|---|
| Quota | | 6,783 | | |
| Liberal | Ray Groom (elected 2) | 9,775 | 18.0 | +1.7 |
| Liberal | John Bennett (elected 3) | 7,525 | 13.9 | +5.1 |
| Liberal | John Barker (elected 4) | 1,486 | 2.7 | +0.1 |
| Liberal | Nell Ames | 597 | 1.1 | +1.1 |
| Liberal | Chris Gibson | 515 | 0.9 | +0.9 |
| Liberal | Tony Steven | 469 | 0.9 | +0.9 |
| Liberal | Beth Darcey | 443 | 0.8 | +0.8 |
| Labor | John White (elected 6) | 4,472 | 8.2 | +2.0 |
| Labor | David Crean (elected 7) | 4,114 | 7.6 | +7.6 |
| Labor | Judy Jackson (elected 5) | 3,942 | 7.3 | +0.5 |
| Labor | Neil Batt | 3,889 | 7.2 | +0.3 |
| Labor | Charles Touber | 1,483 | 2.7 | +2.7 |
| Labor | Andrew Daniels | 1,356 | 2.5 | +2.5 |
| Labor | Catherine Cuthbert | 779 | 1.4 | +1.4 |
| Independent Greens | Bob Brown (elected 1) | 11,755 | 21.7 | +6.1 |
| Independent Greens | Michael Lynch | 537 | 1.0 | +1.0 |
| Independent Greens | Patsy Jones | 236 | 0.4 | +0.4 |
| Independent Greens | Sheena Brookman | 197 | 0.4 | +0.4 |
| Democrats | Robert Bell | 360 | 0.7 | +0.7 |
| Democrats | June Francis | 120 | 0.2 | +0.2 |
| Democrats | Wendy Cuskelly | 101 | 0.2 | +0.2 |
| Independent | Anthony Delara | 106 | 0.2 | +0.2 |
| Total formal votes | | 54,257 | 95.2 | +1.3 |
| Informal votes | | 2,746 | 4.8 | −1.3 |
| Turnout | | 57,003 | 91.4 | −1.3 |
Party total votes
| Liberal | | 20,810 | 38.4 | −5.2 |
| Labor | | 20,035 | 36.9 | +6.1 |
| Independent Greens | | 12,725 | 23.5 | +4.9 |
| Democrats | | 581 | 1.1 | +1.1 |
| Independent | Anthony Delara | 106 | 0.2 | +0.2 |

==== 1986 ====
1986 Tasmanian state election: Denison
| Party | Candidate | Votes | % | ±% |
|---|---|---|---|---|
| Quota | | 6,464 | | |
| Liberal | Ray Groom (elected 1) | 8,406 | 16.3 | +16.3 |
| Liberal | John Bennett (elected 3) | 4,547 | 8.8 | +8.8 |
| Liberal | Geoff Davis (elected 5) | 2,570 | 5.0 | 0.0 |
| Liberal | Carmel Holmes | 2,489 | 4.8 | +3.4 |
| Liberal | John Barker | 1,339 | 2.6 | +2.6 |
| Liberal | Peter Walker | 1,193 | 2.3 | −2.4 |
| Liberal | Clem Hoggett | 1,078 | 2.1 | +2.1 |
| Liberal | Andrew Hurburgh | 946 | 1.8 | +1.8 |
| Labor | Neil Batt (elected 6) | 3,578 | 6.9 | +6.9 |
| Labor | Judy Jackson (elected 4) | 3,516 | 6.8 | +6.8 |
| Labor | John White (elected 7) | 3,203 | 6.2 | +6.2 |
| Labor | Julian Amos | 2,017 | 3.9 | −4.6 |
| Labor | Bob Gordon | 1,795 | 3.5 | +3.5 |
| Labor | Bob Graham | 1,437 | 2.8 | −1.6 |
| Labor | Dee Alty | 389 | 0.8 | +0.8 |
| Independent Greens | Bob Brown (elected 2) | 8,056 | 15.6 | +7.4 |
| Independent Greens | Judy Richter | 171 | 0.3 | +0.3 |
| Independent | Brian Miller | 3,374 | 6.5 | +6.5 |
| Group D | Gabriel Haros | 1,269 | 2.5 | +2.5 |
| Group D | Bernard Devine | 124 | 0.2 | +0.2 |
| Independent | Chris Munday | 214 | 0.4 | +0.4 |
| Total formal votes | | 51,711 | 93.9 | −0.5 |
| Informal votes | | 3,374 | 6.1 | +0.5 |
| Turnout | | 55,085 | 92.7 | 0.0 |
Party total votes
| Liberal | | 22,568 | 43.6 | −5.2 |
| Labor | | 15,935 | 30.8 | +2.2 |
| Independent Greens | | 8,227 | 15.9 | +7.6 |
| Independent | Brian Miller | 3,374 | 6.5 | +6.5 |
| Group D | | 1,393 | 2.7 | +2.7 |
| Independent | Chris Munday | 214 | 0.4 | +0.4 |

==== 1982 ====
1982 Tasmanian state election: Denison
| Party | Candidate | Votes | % | ±% |
|---|---|---|---|---|
| Quota | | 6,201 | | |
| Liberal | Max Bingham (elected 1) | 12,068 | 24.3 | −1.4 |
| Liberal | Gabriel Haros (elected 4) | 2,803 | 5.7 | +0.9 |
| Liberal | Geoff Davis (elected 5) | 2,478 | 5.0 | +2.1 |
| Liberal | John Stopp | 2,433 | 4.9 | +4.9 |
| Liberal | Peter Walker (elected 6) | 2,350 | 4.7 | +4.7 |
| Liberal | Richard Mulcahy | 1,388 | 2.8 | +2.8 |
| Liberal | Carmel Holmes | 708 | 1.4 | +1.4 |
| Labor | Julian Amos (elected 2) | 4,213 | 8.5 | −3.5 |
| Labor | John Devine (elected 3) | 3,760 | 7.6 | −4.1 |
| Labor | Bob Graham | 2,201 | 4.4 | −0.7 |
| Labor | Colin Brown | 1,362 | 2.7 | +2.7 |
| Labor | Ian Cuthbertson | 762 | 1.5 | +1.5 |
| Labor | Marjorie Luck | 711 | 1.4 | +1.4 |
| Labor | Ron Snashall | 686 | 1.4 | +1.4 |
| Labor | Arnold Sierink | 498 | 1.0 | +1.0 |
| Democrats | Norm Sanders (elected 7) | 4,275 | 8.6 | +4.4 |
| Democrats | Angela Devine | 275 | 0.6 | +0.6 |
| Democrats | Mark Clough | 204 | 0.4 | +0.4 |
| Democrats | Peter Creet | 182 | 0.4 | +0.4 |
| Democrats | Rod Broadby | 175 | 0.4 | −2.4 |
| Independent Greens | Bob Brown | 4,064 | 8.2 | +8.2 |
| Independent Greens | Tina Fraser | 209 | 0.4 | +0.4 |
| Group A | Brian Hoyle | 504 | 1.0 | +1.0 |
| Group A | Mike Brown | 336 | 0.7 | +0.7 |
| Independent | Nigel Abbott | 545 | 1.1 | +1.1 |
| Independent | Peter Bell | 131 | 0.3 | +0.3 |
| Independent | Verne Reid | 129 | 0.3 | +0.3 |
| Independent | Harvey Wallace-Williams | 63 | 0.1 | +0.1 |
| Independent | Reg Johnston | 59 | 0.1 | +0.1 |
| Independent | Emery Thierjung | 29 | 0.1 | +0.1 |
| Total formal votes | | 49,601 | 94.4 | −1.9 |
| Informal votes | | 2,965 | 5.6 | +1.9 |
| Turnout | | 52,566 | 92.7 | +0.3 |
Party total votes
| Liberal | | 24,228 | 48.8 | +6.8 |
| Labor | | 14,193 | 28.6 | −22.1 |
| Democrats | | 5,111 | 10.3 | +2.9 |
| Independent Greens | | 4,273 | 8.6 | +8.6 |
| Group A | | 840 | 1.7 | +1.7 |
| Independent | Nigel Abbott | 545 | 1.1 | +1.1 |
| Independent | Peter Bell | 131 | 0.3 | +0.3 |
| Independent | Verne Reid | 129 | 0.3 | +0.3 |
| Independent | Harvey Wallace-Williams | 63 | 0.1 | +0.1 |
| Independent | Reg Johnston | 59 | 0.1 | +0.1 |
| Independent | Emery Thierjung | 29 | 0.1 | +0.1 |

=== Elections in the 1970s ===
==== 1979 ====
1979 Tasmanian state election: Denison
| Party | Candidate | Votes | % | ±% |
|---|---|---|---|---|
| Quota | | 6,048 | | |
| Labor | Neil Batt (elected 2) | 6,106 | 12.6 | −5.8 |
| Labor | Julian Amos (elected 3) | 5,808 | 12.0 | +5.2 |
| Labor | John Devine (elected 4) | 5,664 | 11.7 | +11.7 |
| Labor | John Green (elected 5) | 3,771 | 7.8 | +2.1 |
| Labor | Bob Graham | 2,444 | 5.1 | +5.1 |
| Labor | Des Lavey | 540 | 1.1 | −1.6 |
| Labor | Norm Hanscombe | 183 | 0.4 | +0.4 |
| Liberal | Max Bingham (elected 1) | 12,432 | 25.7 | −5.3 |
| Liberal | Gabriel Haros | 2,320 | 4.8 | +4.8 |
| Liberal | Robert Mather (elected 6) | 1,845 | 3.8 | +1.0 |
| Liberal | Geoff Davis | 1,449 | 3.0 | +3.0 |
| Liberal | Bob Baker (elected 7) | 837 | 1.7 | −1.4 |
| Liberal | Max Robinson | 667 | 1.4 | +0.4 |
| Liberal | John Avery | 533 | 1.1 | +1.1 |
| Liberal | Terry Bower | 218 | 0.5 | +0.5 |
| Democrats | Norm Sanders | 2,044 | 4.2 | +4.2 |
| Democrats | Rod Broadby | 1,360 | 2.8 | +2.8 |
| Democrats | Robert MacFie | 155 | 0.3 | +0.3 |
| Total formal votes | | 48,376 | 96.3 | +0.1 |
| Informal votes | | 1,871 | 3.7 | −0.1 |
| Turnout | | 50,247 | 92.4 | −0.6 |
Party total votes
| Labor | | 24,516 | 50.7 | +3.9 |
| Liberal | | 20,301 | 42.0 | −4.8 |
| Democrats | | 3,559 | 7.4 | +7.4 |

==== 1976 ====
1976 Tasmanian state election: Denison
| Party | Candidate | Votes | % | ±% |
|---|---|---|---|---|
| Quota | | 5,854 | | |
| Liberal | Max Bingham (elected 1) | 14,521 | 31.0 | +7.1 |
| Liberal | Hank Petrusma | 1,777 | 3.8 | +2.0 |
| Liberal | Bob Baker (elected 6) | 1,466 | 3.1 | −0.7 |
| Liberal | Robert Mather (elected 5) | 1,305 | 2.8 | −1.8 |
| Liberal | David Brownlow | 1,297 | 2.8 | +2.8 |
| Liberal | Rudge Townley | 839 | 1.8 | +1.8 |
| Liberal | Max Robinson (elected 7) | 474 | 1.0 | +1.0 |
| Liberal | Basil Giffard | 230 | 0.5 | +0.5 |
| Labor | Neil Batt (elected 2) | 8,639 | 18.4 | +9.7 |
| Labor | Julian Amos (elected 3) | 3,167 | 6.8 | +6.8 |
| Labor | John Green (elected 4) | 2,668 | 5.7 | −4.5 |
| Labor | Ian Cole | 1,887 | 4.0 | +0.4 |
| Labor | Margaret Thurstans | 1,831 | 3.9 | +3.9 |
| Labor | Thomas Gascoigne | 1,316 | 2.8 | +2.8 |
| Labor | Des Lavey | 1,269 | 2.7 | +2.7 |
| Labor | Ken Austin | 1,132 | 2.4 | −6.2 |
| United Tasmania | Rod Broadby | 1,525 | 3.3 | +3.3 |
| United Tasmania | Helen Gee | 352 | 0.8 | +0.8 |
| United Tasmania | Patricia Armstrong | 290 | 0.6 | +0.6 |
| United Tasmania | Patricia Jones | 265 | 0.6 | +0.6 |
| United Tasmania | William Hickson | 96 | 0.2 | +0.2 |
| United Tasmania | Kevin Hazelwood | 73 | 0.2 | +0.2 |
| United Tasmania | David Stephen | 64 | 0.1 | +0.1 |
| Workers | Lance Buckingham | 199 | 0.4 | +0.4 |
| Workers | Peter Mollon | 26 | 0.1 | +0.1 |
| Socialist Workers | Rosanne Fidler | 72 | 0.2 | +0.2 |
| Socialist Workers | John Tully | 51 | 0.1 | +0.1 |
| Total formal votes | | 46,831 | 96.2 | 0.0 |
| Informal votes | | 1,828 | 3.8 | 0.0 |
| Turnout | | 48,659 | 93.0 | −1.3 |
Party total votes
| Liberal | | 21,909 | 46.8 | +6.8 |
| Labor | | 21,909 | 46.8 | +0.5 |
| United Tasmania | | 2,665 | 5.7 | −1.2 |
| Workers | | 225 | 0.5 | +0.5 |
| Socialist Workers | | 123 | 0.3 | +0.3 |

==== 1972 ====
1972 Tasmanian state election: Denison
| Party | Candidate | Votes | % | ±% |
|---|---|---|---|---|
| Quota | | 5,039 | | |
| Labor | Merv Everett (elected 2) | 6,060 | 15.0 | +2.1 |
| Labor | Neil Batt (elected 4) | 3,519 | 8.7 | +1.1 |
| Labor | Ken Austin (elected 5) | 3,485 | 8.6 | +0.4 |
| Labor | Kevin Corby (elected 7) | 2,136 | 5.3 | +5.3 |
| Labor | Ian Cole | 1,466 | 3.6 | +3.6 |
| Labor | Gabriel Klok | 884 | 2.2 | +2.2 |
| Labor | Kath Venn | 607 | 1.5 | +1.5 |
| Labor | John Green | 489 | 1.2 | +1.2 |
| Liberal | Max Bingham (elected 1) | 9,630 | 23.9 | +16.3 |
| Liberal | Robert Mather (elected 3) | 1,865 | 4.6 | −3.2 |
| Liberal | Bob Baker (elected 6) | 1,523 | 3.8 | −0.3 |
| Liberal | George Brown | 887 | 2.2 | −1.7 |
| Liberal | Ronald Banks | 792 | 2.0 | −3.5 |
| Liberal | Hank Petrusma | 724 | 1.8 | +1.8 |
| Liberal | Fred Johnson | 485 | 1.2 | +1.2 |
| Liberal | Kathleen Sargison | 228 | 0.6 | +0.6 |
| United Tasmania | Norman Laird | 1,073 | 2.7 | +2.7 |
| United Tasmania | Alfred White | 739 | 1.8 | +1.8 |
| United Tasmania | Ian Milne | 536 | 1.3 | +1.3 |
| United Tasmania | Kevin Scott | 431 | 1.1 | +1.1 |
| Independent | Nigel Abbott | 1,193 | 3.0 | +3.0 |
| Independent | Bill Wedd | 851 | 2.1 | −4.0 |
| Independent | Harry McLoughlin | 600 | 1.5 | +1.5 |
| Independent | Elvie Cobern | 63 | 0.2 | +0.2 |
| Independent | Joseph Armstrong | 45 | 0.1 | +0.1 |
| Total formal votes | | 40,311 | 96.2 | +1.2 |
| Informal votes | | 1,572 | 3.8 | −1.2 |
| Turnout | | 41,883 | 94.3 | +1.4 |
Party total votes
| Labor | | 18,646 | 46.3 | +2.6 |
| Liberal | | 16,134 | 40.0 | −7.4 |
| United Tasmania | | 2,779 | 6.9 | +6.9 |
| Independent | Nigel Abbott | 1,193 | 3.0 | +3.0 |
| Independent | Bill Wedd | 851 | 2.1 | −4.0 |
| Independent | Harry McLoughlin | 600 | 1.5 | +1.5 |
| Independent | Elvie Cobern | 63 | 0.2 | +0.2 |
| Independent | Joseph Armstrong | 45 | 0.1 | +0.1 |
