= Results of the 1979 Tasmanian state election =

Tasmanian state election, 18 July 1979 House of Assembly << 1976–1982 >>
Enrolled voters	265,428				
Votes cast	248,866		Turnout	93.76	–0.78
Informal votes	9,582		Informal	3.85	+0.05
Summary of votes by party
Party	Primary votes	%	Swing	Seats	Change
Labor	129,973	54.32	+1.84	20	+ 2
Liberal	98,845	41.31	–3.18	15	– 2
Democrats	6,858	2.87	+2.87	0	± 0
Independent	3,608	1.51	+0.68	0	± 0
Total	239,284			35	

This is a list of House of Assembly results for the 1979 Tasmanian election.

== Results by division ==
=== Bass ===
1979 Tasmanian state election: Bass
Party	Candidate	Votes	%	±%
Quota		6,046		
Labor	Harry Holgate (elected 2)	9,286	19.2	+11.2
Labor	Gill James (elected 3)	5,297	11.0	+1.9
Labor	Michael Barnard (elected 4)	4,288	8.9	−10.4
Labor	Mary Willey (elected 5)	2,874	5.9	+5.9
Labor	Mikel Powell	1,516	3.1	+3.1
Labor	Geoff Sweet	769	1.6	+1.6
Labor	Ernie Mitchell	282	0.6	+0.6
Liberal	Neil Robson (elected 1)	10,700	22.1	+15.5
Liberal	Max Bushby (elected 7)	3,036	6.3	−0.5
Liberal	George Brookes	2,405	5.0	+5.0
Liberal	John Beswick (elected 6)	2,077	4.3	−0.1
Liberal	Jim Mooney	1,925	4.0	−2.9
Liberal	Graeme Davis	744	1.5	+1.5
Liberal	Tony Stonjek	715	1.5	+1.5
Independent	Neil Pitt	2,007	4.1	+4.1
Group C	Karoly Hegedus	277	0.6	+0.6
Group C	Jim Garratt	169	0.3	+0.3
Total formal votes		48,367	95.7	−0.1
Informal votes		2,163	4.3	+0.1
Turnout		50,530	94.3	0.0
Party total votes
Labor		24,312	50.3	+1.6
Liberal		21,602	44.7	−4.5
Independent	Neil Pitt	2,007	4.1	+4.1
Group C		446	0.9	+0.9

=== Braddon ===
1979 Tasmanian state election: Braddon
Party	Candidate	Votes	%	±%
Quota		5,755		
Labor	John Coughlan (elected 1)	7,731	16.8	+6.7
Labor	Michael Field (elected 3)	5,481	11.9	+4.8
Labor	Glen Davies (elected 5)	4,547	9.9	−6.0
Labor	Michael Weldon (elected 6)	2,423	5.3	+5.3
Labor	Maurice Dart	2,022	4.4	+1.5
Labor	Geoff Chisholm	1,903	4.1	−4.2
Labor	Wendy Faulkes	849	1.8	+1.8
Liberal	Ray Bonney (elected 2)	7,548	16.4	+3.5
Liberal	Roger Groom (elected 4)	3,752	8.1	+1.4
Liberal	Ron Cornish (elected 7)	3,464	7.5	−0.5
Liberal	Tony Fletcher	2,837	6.2	+6.2
Liberal	Terry Stuart	787	1.7	+1.7
Liberal	Bill French	699	1.5	+1.5
Liberal	Anne Gribbin	584	1.3	+1.3
Democrats	Lynton Viant	783	1.7	+1.7
Democrats	Des Kynaston	134	0.3	+0.3
Independent	Ted Vickers	465	1.0	+1.0
Independent	Philip Treagus	30	0.1	+0.1
Total formal votes		46,039	96.2	−0.4
Informal votes		1,806	3.8	+0.4
Turnout		47,845	93.1	−1.2
Party total votes
Labor		24,956	54.2	+0.3
Liberal		19,671	42.7	−3.2
Democrats		917	2.0	+2.0
Independent	Ted Vickers	465	1.0	+1.0
Independent	Philip Treagus	30	0.1	+0.1

=== Denison ===
1979 Tasmanian state election: Denison
Party	Candidate	Votes	%	±%
Quota		6,048		
Labor	Neil Batt (elected 2)	6,106	12.6	−5.8
Labor	Julian Amos (elected 3)	5,808	12.0	+5.2
Labor	John Devine (elected 4)	5,664	11.7	+11.7
Labor	John Green (elected 5)	3,771	7.8	+2.1
Labor	Bob Graham	2,444	5.1	+5.1
Labor	Des Lavey	540	1.1	−1.6
Labor	Norm Hanscombe	183	0.4	+0.4
Liberal	Max Bingham (elected 1)	12,432	25.7	−5.3
Liberal	Gabriel Haros	2,320	4.8	+4.8
Liberal	Robert Mather (elected 6)	1,845	3.8	+1.0
Liberal	Geoff Davis	1,449	3.0	+3.0
Liberal	Bob Baker (elected 7)	837	1.7	−1.4
Liberal	Max Robinson	667	1.4	+0.4
Liberal	John Avery	533	1.1	+1.1
Liberal	Terry Bower	218	0.5	+0.5
Democrats	Norm Sanders	2,044	4.2	+4.2
Democrats	Rod Broadby	1,360	2.8	+2.8
Democrats	Robert MacFie	155	0.3	+0.3
Total formal votes		48,376	96.3	+0.1
Informal votes		1,871	3.7	−0.1
Turnout		50,247	92.4	−0.6
Party total votes
Labor		24,516	50.7	+3.9
Liberal		20,301	42.0	−4.8
Democrats		3,559	7.4	+7.4

=== Franklin ===
1979 Tasmanian state election: Franklin
Party	Candidate	Votes	%	±%
Quota		6,096		
Labor	Doug Lowe (elected 1)	24,971	51.2	+36.5
Labor	Eric Barnard (elected 3)	1,538	3.2	−2.9
Labor	Michael Aird (elected 4)	1,321	2.7	−3.4
Labor	Bill McKinnon	1,037	2.1	+0.7
Labor	Dick Adams (elected 5)	327	0.7	+0.7
Labor	Stan Joiner	225	0.5	+0.5
Labor	Doreen Andrews	217	0.4	+0.4
Liberal	Geoff Pearsall (elected 2)	7,673	15.7	+7.3
Liberal	John Beattie (elected 6)	3,641	7.5	−5.3
Liberal	John Cleary (elected 7)	1,846	3.8	+3.8
Liberal	Chris Guesdon	1,361	2.8	+2.8
Liberal	Steve Gilmour	1,009	2.1	−3.2
Liberal	Bev Wills	580	1.2	+1.2
Liberal	Richard James	415	0.9	+0.9
Democrats	Peter Brown	2,142	4.4	+4.4
Democrats	John Harrison	161	0.3	+0.3
Democrats	Bruce Kent	79	0.2	+0.2
Independent	Tony Jackson	128	0.3	+0.3
Independent	Doris Wright	95	0.2	+0.2
Total formal votes		48,766	96.7	+0.5
Informal votes		1,675	3.3	−0.5
Turnout		50,441	94.5	−0.8
Party total votes
Labor		29,636	60.8	+1.4
Liberal		16,525	33.9	−2.0
Democrats		2,382	4.9	+4.9
Independent	Tony Jackson	128	0.3	+0.3
Independent	Doris Wright	95	0.2	+0.2

=== Wilmot ===
1979 Tasmanian state election: Wilmot
Party	Candidate	Votes	%	±%
Labor	Michael Polley (elected 2)	7,090	14.9	−2.0
Labor	Darrel Baldock (elected 3)	6,183	13.0	−0.2
Labor	Andrew Lohrey (elected 4)	5,642	11.8	+4.0
Labor	Terry Aulich (elected 7)	3,690	7.7	+4.6
Labor	Geoffrey Woods	2,051	4.3	+4.3
Labor	Brian Smith	1,180	2.5	+2.5
Labor	Ken Smith	717	1.5	+1.5
Liberal	Robin Gray (elected 1)	10,615	22.2	+12.5
Liberal	Ian Braid (elected 5)	4,173	8.7	+0.5
Liberal	Graeme Page (elected 6)	2,192	4.6	−1.1
Liberal	Geoff Squibb	1,548	3.2	+3.2
Liberal	Margaret Peacock	1,387	2.9	+2.9
Liberal	David Rubock	449	0.9	+0.9
Liberal	Stephen Salter	382	0.8	+0.8
Independent	Fred Woods	437	0.9	+0.9
Total formal votes		47,736	95.8	−0.3
Informal votes		2,067	4.2	+0.3
Turnout		49,803	94.6	−1.1
Party total votes
Labor		26,553	55.6	+2.5
Liberal		20,746	43.5	−1.5
Independent	Fred Woods	437	0.9	+0.9

== See also ==
- 1979 Tasmanian state election
- Members of the Tasmanian House of Assembly, 1979–1982
- Candidates of the 1979 Tasmanian state election
