= Results of the 1982 Tasmanian state election =

Tasmanian state election, 15 May 1982 House of Assembly << 1979–1986 >>
Enrolled voters	283,549				
Votes cast	265,101		Turnout	93.49	–0.27
Informal votes	15,055		Informal	5.66%	+1.81%
Summary of votes by party
Party	Primary votes	%	Swing	Seats	Change
Liberal	121,346	48.52	+7.21	19	+ 4
Labor	92,184	36.86	–17.46	14	– 6
Democrats	13,476	5.39	+2.52	1	+ 1
Ind. Labor	12,432	4.97	+4.97	1	+ 1
Ind. Green^{[1]}	4,273	1.71	+1.71	0	± 0
Independent	6,385	2.55	+1.05	0	± 0
Total	250,096			35	

This is a list of House of Assembly results for the 1982 Tasmanian election.

== Results by division ==
=== Bass ===
1982 Tasmanian state election: Bass
Party	Candidate	Votes	%	±%
Quota		6,274		
Liberal	Neil Robson (elected 1)	12,103	24.1	+2.0
Liberal	John Beswick (elected 4)	3,301	6.6	+2.3
Liberal	Max Bushby (elected 5)	3,019	6.0	−0.3
Liberal	Brendan Lyons (elected 6)	2,619	5.2	+5.2
Liberal	George Brookes	2,412	4.8	−0.2
Liberal	Brian Coogan	945	1.9	+1.9
Liberal	Ivan Williams	852	1.7	+1.7
Labor	Harry Holgate (elected 2)	6,606	13.2	−6.0
Labor	Gill James (elected 3)	4,276	8.5	−2.5
Labor	Michael Barnard (elected 7)	2,946	5.9	−3.0
Labor	William Zeeman	2,572	5.1	+5.1
Labor	Peter Patmore	1,046	2.1	+2.1
Labor	Wendy Carnicelli	589	1.2	+1.2
Labor	Paul Driscoll	330	0.7	+0.7
Group C	Mary Willey	2,863	5.7	+5.7
Group C	Nigel Davies	1,363	2.7	+2.7
Group C	Dawn Rhodes	411	0.8	+0.8
Democrats	Nick Goldie	454	0.9	+0.9
Democrats	Rae Saxon	293	0.6	+0.6
Democrats	Pat Stride	275	0.5	+0.5
Democrats	Gillean Munro	267	0.5	+0.5
Democrats	Max Lubke	244	0.5	+0.5
Democrats	Joan Bell	206	0.4	+0.4
Democrats	Rick Rolls	194	0.4	+0.4
Total formal votes		50,186	94.2	−1.5
Informal votes		3,106	5.8	+1.5
Turnout		53,292	93.9	+0.4
Party total votes
Liberal		25,251	50.3	+5.6
Labor		18,365	36.6	−13.7
Group C		4,637	9.2	+9.2
Democrats		1,933	3.9	+3.9

=== Braddon ===
1982 Tasmanian state election: Braddon
Party	Candidate	Votes	%	±%
Quota		6,074		
Liberal	Ray Bonney (elected 1)	7,069	14.5	−1.9
Liberal	Roger Groom (elected 2)	5,174	10.6	+2.5
Liberal	Ron Cornish (elected 3)	4,933	10.2	+2.7
Liberal	Vince Smith (elected 5)	3,138	6.5	+6.5
Liberal	Tony Rundle	1,808	3.7	+3.7
Liberal	Malcolm Fenton	1,204	2.5	+2.5
Liberal	Barbara Lamberton	849	1.7	+1.7
Labor	John Coughlan (elected 4)	5,050	10.4	−6.4
Labor	Michael Field (elected 6)	4,569	9.4	−2.5
Labor	Glen Davies (elected 7)	3,577	7.4	−2.5
Labor	Michael Weldon	3,011	6.2	+0.9
Labor	Steve Daley	1,646	3.4	+3.4
Labor	Bruce Duhig	1,179	2.4	+2.4
Labor	Peter Blizzard	1,037	2.1	+2.1
Democrats	Margaret Duthoit	739	1.5	+1.5
Democrats	Allan McDonald	679	1.4	+1.4
Democrats	Gavin Bugg	521	1.1	+1.1
Group D	Kerry Berwick	914	1.9	+1.9
Group D	Ronald Machen	647	1.3	+1.3
Group C	James Hay	193	0.4	+0.4
Group C	Graham Gee	146	0.3	+0.3
Independent	Terrence Reid	315	0.6	+0.6
Independent	Michael Boylan	136	0.3	+0.3
Independent	Ivan Walsh	56	0.1	+0.1
Total formal votes		48,590	95.0	−1.2
Informal votes		2,579	5.0	+1.2
Turnout		51,169	92.7	−0.4
Party total votes
Liberal		24,175	49.8	+7.1
Labor		20,069	41.3	−12.9
Democrats		1,939	4.0	+2.0
Group D		1,561	3.2	+3.2
Group C		339	0.7	+0.7
Independent	Terrence Reid	315	0.6	+0.6
Independent	Michael Boylan	136	0.3	+0.3
Independent	Ivan Walsh	56	0.1	+0.1

=== Denison ===
1982 Tasmanian state election: Denison
Party	Candidate	Votes	%	±%
Quota		6,201		
Liberal	Max Bingham (elected 1)	12,068	24.3	−1.4
Liberal	Gabriel Haros (elected 4)	2,803	5.7	+0.9
Liberal	Geoff Davis (elected 5)	2,478	5.0	+2.1
Liberal	John Stopp	2,433	4.9	+4.9
Liberal	Peter Walker (elected 6)	2,350	4.7	+4.7
Liberal	Richard Mulcahy	1,388	2.8	+2.8
Liberal	Carmel Holmes	708	1.4	+1.4
Labor	Julian Amos (elected 2)	4,213	8.5	−3.5
Labor	John Devine (elected 3)	3,760	7.6	−4.1
Labor	Bob Graham	2,201	4.4	−0.7
Labor	Colin Brown	1,362	2.7	+2.7
Labor	Ian Cuthbertson	762	1.5	+1.5
Labor	Marjorie Luck	711	1.4	+1.4
Labor	Ron Snashall	686	1.4	+1.4
Labor	Arnold Sierink	498	1.0	+1.0
Democrats	Norm Sanders (elected 7)	4,275	8.6	+4.4
Democrats	Angela Devine	275	0.6	+0.6
Democrats	Mark Clough	204	0.4	+0.4
Democrats	Peter Creet	182	0.4	+0.4
Democrats	Rod Broadby	175	0.4	−2.4
Independent Greens	Bob Brown	4,064	8.2	+8.2
Independent Greens	Tina Fraser	209	0.4	+0.4
Group A	Brian Hoyle	504	1.0	+1.0
Group A	Mike Brown	336	0.7	+0.7
Independent	Nigel Abbott	545	1.1	+1.1
Independent	Peter Bell	131	0.3	+0.3
Independent	Verne Reid	129	0.3	+0.3
Independent	Harvey Wallace-Williams	63	0.1	+0.1
Independent	Reg Johnston	59	0.1	+0.1
Independent	Emery Thierjung	29	0.1	+0.1
Total formal votes		49,601	94.4	−1.9
Informal votes		2,965	5.6	+1.9
Turnout		52,566	92.7	+0.3
Party total votes
Liberal		24,228	48.8	+6.8
Labor		14,193	28.6	−22.1
Democrats		5,111	10.3	+2.9
Independent Greens		4,273	8.6	+8.6
Group A		840	1.7	+1.7
Independent	Nigel Abbott	545	1.1	+1.1
Independent	Peter Bell	131	0.3	+0.3
Independent	Verne Reid	129	0.3	+0.3
Independent	Harvey Wallace-Williams	63	0.1	+0.1
Independent	Reg Johnston	59	0.1	+0.1
Independent	Emery Thierjung	29	0.1	+0.1

=== Franklin ===
1982 Tasmanian state election: Franklin
Party	Candidate	Votes	%	±%
Quota		6,427		
Liberal	Geoff Pearsall (elected 3)	6,719	13.1	−2.6
Liberal	John Cleary (elected 4)	5,470	10.6	+6.8
Liberal	Graham Woodward	3,983	7.7	+7.7
Liberal	John Beattie (elected 7)	3,982	7.7	+0.2
Liberal	Bern Cuthbertson	910	1.8	+1.8
Liberal	Mrs S Dixson	775	1.5	+1.5
Liberal	Joan Ellims	296	0.6	+0.6
Labor	Ken Wriedt (elected 1)	13,250	25.8	+25.8
Labor	Bill McKinnon (elected 6)	1,190	2.3	+0.2
Labor	Michael Aird (elected 5)	1,143	2.3	−0.4
Labor	Dick Adams	1,093	2.1	+1.4
Labor	Stan Bell	819	1.6	+1.6
Labor	Kerry Fogarty	432	0.8	+0.8
Labor	Einstein Jager	350	0.7	+0.7
Labor	Murray Delphin	258	0.5	+0.5
Group D	Doug Lowe (elected 2)	7,458	14.5	+14.5
Group D	Dale Eagling	337	0.7	+0.7
Democrats	Peter Brown	1,838	3.6	−0.8
Democrats	June Francis	267	0.5	+0.5
Democrats	John Thompson	238	0.5	+0.5
Democrats	Bruce Kent	168	0.3	+0.1
Democrats	Malcolm Gregory	162	0.3	+0.3
Independent	Bill Spencer	164	0.3	+0.3
Independent	Alan Barnett	63	0.1	+0.1
Independent	Anthony Oldfield	31	0.1	+0.1
Independent	Edward Dyer	14	0.1	+0.1
Total formal votes		51,410	94.0	−2.7
Informal votes		3,270	6.0	+2.7
Turnout		54,680	94.0	−0.5
Party total votes
Liberal		22,135	43.1	+9.2
Labor		18,535	36.1	−24.7
Group D		7,795	15.2	+15.2
Democrats		2,673	5.2	+0.3
Independent	Bill Spencer	164	0.3	+0.3
Independent	Alan Barnett	63	0.1	+0.1
Independent	Anthony Oldfield	31	0.1	+0.1
Independent	Edward Dyer	14	0.1	+0.1

=== Wilmot ===
1982 Tasmanian state election: Wilmot
Party	Candidate	Votes	%	±%
Quota		6,289		
Liberal	Robin Gray (elected 1)	16,233	32.3	+10.1
Liberal	Ian Braid (elected 2)	3,935	7.8	−0.9
Liberal	Graeme Page (elected 5)	1,935	3.8	−0.8
Liberal	Bruce Stewart	1,140	2.3	+2.3
Liberal	Stephen Salter (elected 6)	1,031	2.0	+1.2
Liberal	Edyth Langham	719	1.4	+1.4
Liberal	Kim Oswin	564	1.1	+1.1
Labor	Michael Polley (elected 4)	5,996	11.9	−3.0
Labor	Darrel Baldock (elected 3)	5,751	11.4	−1.6
Labor	Terry Aulich	3,619	7.2	−0.5
Labor	Andrew Lohrey (elected 7)	2,723	5.4	−6.4
Labor	Chris Batt	1,168	2.3	+2.3
Labor	Marguerite Scott	674	1.3	+1.3
Labor	Ken Smith	564	1.1	−0.4
Labor	Tony Beckerath	527	1.0	+1.0
Democrats	Liz Holloway	1,058	2.1	+2.1
Democrats	Nigel Burch	762	1.5	+1.5
Group C	Jeff Weston	729	1.4	+1.4
Group C	John Reed	379	0.8	+0.8
Independent	Gregory Suitor	324	0.6	+0.6
Independent	Len De Kok	196	0.4	+0.4
Independent	Adrian Brettingham-Moore	192	0.4	+0.4
Independent	John Clune	90	0.2	+0.2
Total formal votes		50,309	94.2	−1.6
Informal votes		3,085	5.8	+1.6
Turnout		53,394	94.2	−0.4
Party total votes
Liberal		25,557	50.8	+7.3
Labor		21,022	41.8	−13.8
Democrats		1,820	3.6	+3.6
Group C		1,108	2.2	+2.2
Independent	Gregory Suitor	324	0.6	+0.6
Independent	Len De Kok	196	0.4	+0.4
Independent	Adrian Brettingham-Moore	192	0.4	+0.4
Independent	John Clune	90	0.2	+0.2

== See also ==
- 1982 Tasmanian state election
- Members of the Tasmanian House of Assembly, 1982–1986
- Candidates of the 1982 Tasmanian state election
