= Candidates of the 1986 Tasmanian state election =

The 1986 Tasmanian state election was held on 8 February 1986.

== Retiring Members ==
=== Liberal ===
- Ray Bonney MLA (Braddon)

=== Independent ===
- Doug Lowe MLA (Franklin)

== House of Assembly ==
Sitting members are shown in bold text. Tickets that elected at least one MHA are highlighted in the relevant colour. Successful candidates are indicated by an asterisk (*).

=== Bass ===
Seven seats were up for election. The Labor Party was defending three seats. The Liberal Party was defending four seats.

| Labor candidates | Liberal candidates | Democrats candidates |
|---|---|---|
| Wendy Carcinelli; Geoff Carr; David Hanlon; **Harry Holgate***; **Gill James***; John McDonald; **Peter Patmore*** | **John Beswick***; **Max Bushby**; Don Jones; **Brendan Lyons**; Frank Madill*; Peter Rae*; **Neil Robson*** | Nick Goldie; Kathleen Maxwell; Michael Preece |

=== Braddon ===
Seven seats were up for election. The Labor Party was defending three seats. The Liberal Party was defending four seats.

| Labor candidates | Liberal candidates | Democrats candidates | Ungrouped candidates |
|---|---|---|---|
| **John Coughlan**; **Glen Davies**; **Michael Field***; Robin Lohrey; Marjorie Luck; Greg Peart*; Michael Weldon* | Bill Bonde*; **Ron Cornish***; **Roger Groom***; Gerald O'Dea; Tony Rundle*; **Vince Smith**; Carol Thomson | Greg Sergeant; Kent Taylor | Les Woods |

=== Denison ===
Seven seats were up for election. The Labor Party was defending two seats. The Liberal Party was defending four seats, although sitting MP Gabriel Haros had been expelled from the party. The Australian Democrats had won a seat in 1982, but that seat had been filled in a recount by Independent Green Bob Brown.

| Labor candidates | Liberal candidates | Green Inds candidates | Group D candidates | Ungrouped candidates |
|---|---|---|---|---|
| Dee Alty; **Julian Amos**; Neil Batt*; Bob Gordon; **Bob Graham**; Judy Jackson*; John White* | John Barker; John Bennett*; **Geoff Davis***; Ray Groom*; Clem Hoggett; **Carmel Holmes**; Andrew Hurburgh; **Peter Walker** | **Bob Brown***; Judy Richter | Bernard Devine; **Gabriel Haros** | Brian Miller; Chris Munday |

=== Franklin ===
Seven seats were up for election. The Labor Party was defending three seats. The Liberal Party was defending three seats. One seat was held by the Independent former premier, Doug Lowe.

| Labor candidates | Liberal candidates | Green Inds candidates |
|---|---|---|
| **Michael Aird**; Fran Bladel*; John Forster; Unc Jager; **Bill McKinnon**; Nick Sherry; **Ken Wriedt*** | **John Beattie***; **John Cleary**; Nick Evers*; Peter Hodgman*; Colin Howlett; **Geoff Pearsall***; Ivan Pearson | Gerry Bates*; Patsy Harmsen |

=== Lyons ===
Seven seats were up for election. The Labor Party was defending three seats. The Liberal Party was defending four seats.

| Labor candidates | Liberal candidates | Ungrouped candidates |
|---|---|---|
| **Darrel Baldock***; Chris Batt; Lynden Leppard; David Llewellyn*; **Andrew Lohrey**; **Michael Polley***; Fritz Robinson | **Ian Braid***; Helen Brock; **Robin Gray***; Jim Hay; Bob Mainwaring*; **Graeme Page***; **Stephen Salter** | Bill Chugg |

== See also ==
- Members of the Tasmanian House of Assembly, 1982–1986
- Members of the Tasmanian House of Assembly, 1986–1989
- Results of the Tasmanian state election, 1986
