= Candidates of the 1982 Tasmanian state election =

The 1982 Tasmanian state election was held on 15 May 1982.

== Retiring Members ==
=== Liberal ===
- Robert Mather MLA (Denison)

== House of Assembly ==
Sitting members are shown in bold text. Tickets that elected at least one MHA are highlighted in the relevant colour. Successful candidates are indicated by an asterisk (*).

=== Bass ===
Seven seats were up for election. The Labor Party was defending four seats, although Mary Willey had left the party to sit as an independent. The Liberal Party was defending three seats.

Labor candidates	Liberal candidates	Democrats candidates	Group C candidates
**Michael Barnard***; Wendy Carcinelli; Paul Driscoll; **Harry Holgate***; **Gill James***; Peter Patmore; William Zeeman	**John Beswick***; George Brookes; **Max Bushby***; Brian Coogan; Brendan Lyons*; **Neil Robson***; Ivan Williams	Joan Bell; Nick Goldie; Max Lubke; Gillean Munro; Rick Rolls; Rae Saxon; Pat Stride	Nigel Davies; Dawn Rhodes; **Mary Willey**

=== Braddon ===
Seven seats were up for election. The Labor Party was defending four seats. The Liberal Party was defending three seats.

Labor candidates	Liberal candidates	Democrats candidates	Group C candidates	Group D candidates	Ungrouped candidates
Peter Blizzard; **John Coughlan***; Steve Daley; **Glen Davies***; Bruce Duhig; **Michael Field***; **Michael Weldon**	**Ray Bonney***; **Ron Cornish***; Malcolm Fenton; **Roger Groom***; Barbara Lamberton; Tony Rundle; Vince Smith*	Gavin Bugg; Margaret Duthoit; Allan McDonald	Graham Gee; James Hay	Kerry Berwick; Ronald Machen	Michael Boylan; Terrence Reid; Ivan Walsh

=== Denison ===
Seven seats were up for election. The Labor Party was defending three seats. The Liberal Party was defending three seats. The Australian Democrats were defending one seat.

Labor candidates	Liberal candidates	Democrats candidates	Green Inds candidates	Group A candidates	Ungrouped candidates
**Julian Amos***; Colin Brown; Ian Cuthbertson; **John Devine***; **Bob Graham**; Marjorie Luck; Arnold Sierink; Ron Snashall	**Max Bingham***; Geoff Davis*; **Gabriel Haros***; Carmel Holmes; Richard Mulcahy; John Stopp; Peter Walker*	Rod Broadby; Mark Clough; Peter Creet; Angela Devine; **Norm Sanders***	Bob Brown; Tina Fraser	Mike Brown; Brian Hoyle	Nigel Abbott; Peter Bell; Reg Johnston; Verne Reid; Emery Thierjung; Harvey Wallace-Williams

=== Franklin ===
Seven seats were up for election. The Labor Party was defending four seats, although former premier Doug Lowe had left the party to sit as an independent. The Liberal Party was defending three seats.

Labor candidates	Liberal candidates	Democrats candidates	Group D candidates	Ungrouped candidates
**Dick Adams**; **Michael Aird***; Stan Bell; Murray Delphin; Kerry Fogarty; Einstein Jager; **Bill McKinnon***; Ken Wriedt*	**John Beattie***; **John Cleary***; Bern Cuthbertson; S Dixson; Joan Ellims; **Geoff Pearsall***; Graham Woodward	Peter Brown; June Francis; Malcolm Gregory; Bruce Kent; John Thomson	Dale Eagling; **Doug Lowe***	Alan Barnett; Edward Dyer; Anthony Oldfield; Bill Spencer

=== Wilmot ===
Seven seats were up for election. The Labor Party was defending four seats. The Liberal Party was defending three seats.

Labor candidates	Liberal candidates	Democrats candidates	Group C candidates	Ungrouped candidates
**Terry Aulich**; **Darrel Baldock***; Chris Batt; Tony Beckerath; **Andrew Lohrey***; **Michael Polley***; Marguerite Scott; Ken Smith	**Ian Braid***; **Robin Gray***; Edyth Langham; Kim Oswin; **Graeme Page***; Stephen Salter*; Bruce Stewart	Nigel Burch; Liz Holloway	John Reid; Jeff Weston	Adrian Brettingham-Moore; John Clune; Len de Kok; Gregory Suitor

== See also ==
- Members of the Tasmanian House of Assembly, 1979–1982
- Members of the Tasmanian House of Assembly, 1982–1986
