= Candidates of the 1979 Tasmanian state election =

The 1979 Tasmanian state election was held on 18 July 1979.

== Retiring Members ==
=== Labor ===
- Ray Sherry MHA (Franklin)

=== Liberal ===
- Bill Beattie MHA (Bass)

== House of Assembly ==
Sitting members are shown in bold text. Tickets that elected at least one MHA are highlighted in the relevant colour. Successful candidates are indicated by an asterisk (*).

=== Bass ===
Seven seats were up for election. The Labor Party was defending three seats. The Liberal Party was defending four seats.

Labor candidates	Liberal candidates	Group C candidates	Ungrouped candidates
**Harry Holgate***; Geoff Sweet; Ernie Mitchell; Mikel Powell; **Gill James***; Mary Willey*; **Michael Barnard***	**Neil Robson***; John Beswick*; Graeme Davis; **Max Bushby***; **Jim Mooney**; George Brookes; Tony Stonjek	Jim Garratt; Karoly Hegedus	Neil Pitt

=== Braddon ===
Seven seats were up for election. The Labor Party was defending four seats. The Liberal Party was defending three seats.

Labor candidates	Liberal candidates	Democrats candidates	Ungrouped candidates
**John Coughlan***; **Michael Field***; Michael Weldon*; **Geoff Chisholm**; Wendy Faulkes; Maurice Dart; **Glen Davies***	**Ray Bonney***; Terry Stuart; **Roger Groom***; **Ron Cornish***; Anne Gribbin; Bill French; Tony Fletcher	Lynton Viant; Des Kynaston	Ted Vickers; Philip Treagus

=== Denison ===
Seven seats were up for election. The Labor Party was defending three seats. The Liberal Party was defending four seats.

Labor candidates	Liberal candidates	Democrats candidates
**Julian Amos***; John Devine*; Des Lavey; **Neil Batt***; **John Green***; Norm Hanscombe; Bob Graham	**Max Bingham***; Tony Bower; **Bob Baker***; **Max Robinson**; Gabriel Haros; Geoff Davis; John Avery; **Robert Mather***	Rod Broadby; Robert MacFie; Norm Sanders

=== Franklin ===
Seven seats were up for election. The Labor Party was defending four seats. The Liberal Party was defending three seats.

Labor candidates	Liberal candidates	Democrats candidates	Ungrouped candidates
**Doug Lowe***; Dick Adams*; Stan Joiner; **Bill McKinnon**; **Eric Barnard***; Michael Aird*; Doreen Andrews	Chris Guesdon; Bev Wills; **Steve Gilmour**; John Cleary*; **John Beattie***; Richard James; **Geoff Pearsall***	Peter Brown; John Harrison; Bruce Kent	Doris Wright; Tony Jackson

=== Wilmot ===
Seven seats were up for election. The Labor Party was defending four seats. The Liberal Party was defending three seats.

Labor candidates	Liberal candidates	Ungrouped candidates
Geoffrey Woods; Ken Smith; **Michael Polley***; Brian Smith; **Terry Aulich***; **Darrel Baldock***; **Andrew Lohrey***	**Robin Gray***; **Graeme Page***; Margaret Peacock; David Rubock; Stephen Salter; **Ian Braid***; Geoff Squibb	Fred Woods

== See also ==
- Members of the Tasmanian House of Assembly, 1976–1979
- Members of the Tasmanian House of Assembly, 1979–1982
