= Members of the Tasmanian House of Assembly, 1982–1986 =

This is a list of members of the Tasmanian House of Assembly, elected at the 1982 state election:

Name	Party	Electorate	Years in office
Michael Aird	Labor	Franklin	1979–1986, 1989–1995
Dr Julian Amos	Labor	Denison	1976–1986, 1992–1996
Darrel Baldock	Labor	Wilmot	1972–1987
Michael Barnard^{[4]}	Labor	Bass	1969–1984
John Beattie	Liberal	Franklin	1972–1989
John Beswick	Liberal	Bass	1979–1998
Max Bingham^{[2]}	Liberal	Denison	1969–1984
Ray Bonney	Liberal	Braddon	1972–1986
Ian Braid	Liberal	Wilmot	1969–1972, 1975–1995
Bob Brown^{[1]}	Ind. Green	Denison	1983–1993
Max Bushby	Liberal	Bass	1964–1986
John Cleary	Liberal	Franklin	1979–1986, 1988–1998
Ron Cornish	Liberal	Braddon	1976–1998
John Coughlan	Labor	Braddon	1975–1986
Glen Davies	Labor	Braddon	1972–1986
Geoff Davis	Liberal	Denison	1982–1987
John Devine^{[3]}	Labor	Denison	1979–1984
Michael Field	Labor	Braddon	1976–1997
Bob Graham^{[3]}	Labor	Denison	1980–1982, 1984–1986
Robin Gray	Liberal	Wilmot	1976–1995
Roger Groom	Liberal	Braddon	1976–1997
Gabriel Haros^{[5]}	Liberal	Denison	1980–1986
Harry Holgate	Labor	Bass	1974–1992
Carmel Holmes^{[2]}	Liberal	Denison	1984–1986
Gill James	Labor	Bass	1976–1989, 1992–2002
Andrew Lohrey	Labor	Wilmot	1972–1986
Doug Lowe	Independent	Franklin	1969–1986
Brendan Lyons	Liberal	Bass	1982–1986
Bill McKinnon	Labor	Franklin	1977–1979, 1979–1986
Graeme Page	Liberal	Wilmot	1976–1996
Peter Patmore^{[4]}	Labor	Bass	1984–2002
Geoff Pearsall	Liberal	Franklin	1969–1988
Michael Polley	Labor	Wilmot	1972–2014
Neil Robson	Liberal	Bass	1976–1992
Stephen Salter	Liberal	Wilmot	1982–1986
Norm Sanders^{[1]}	Democrat	Denison	1980–1983
Vince Smith	Liberal	Braddon	1982–1986
Peter Walker	Liberal	Denison	1982–1986
Ken Wriedt	Labor	Franklin	1982–1986

^{1} Denison Democrat MHA Norm Sanders resigned in late 1982 to run for the Australian Senate at the 1983 federal election. Independent green candidate Bob Brown, then briefly jailed as a result of protests against the Franklin Dam, was elected as his replacement on 4 January 1983. This was an unprecedented event in Tasmanian politics, as recounts virtually always result in the election of a member of the same party. However, as Sanders was more well known for his environmentalist activism than his work with the Democrats, his preferences passed to fellow activist Brown ahead of the other Democrat candidates.
^{2} Denison Liberal MHA Max Bingham resigned in early 1984. Carmel Holmes was elected as his replacement on 25 June.
^{3} Denison Labor MHA John Devine resigned in early 1984. Bob Graham was elected as his replacement on 25 June.
^{4} Bass Labor MHA Michael Barnard resigned in mid–1984. Peter Patmore was elected as his replacement on 10 August.
^{5} In 1983, Denison Liberal MHA Gabriel Haros was convicted for attempted false pretences and struck off as a legal practitioner. Despite maintaining Premier Gray's support, in mid-November 1985, he failed to be endorsed for the seat by the Liberal Party and stood unsuccessfully as an independent at the 1986 election.
