= Results of the 1989 Tasmanian state election =

Tasmanian state election, 13 May 1989 House of Assembly << 1986–1992 >>
Enrolled voters	310,066				
Votes cast	288,575		Turnout	93.07	–0.74
Informal votes	15,438		Informal	5.35	–0.58
Summary of votes by party
Party	Primary votes	%	Swing	Seats	Change
Liberal	128,143	46.92	–7.28	17	– 2
Labor	90,003	34.71	–0.43	13	– 1
Ind. Green	46,797	17.13	+11.58	5	+ 3
Democrats	2,451	0.90	–1.16	0	± 0
Independent	937	0.34	–2.71	0	± 0
Total	273,137			35	

This is a list of House of Assembly results for the 1989 Tasmanian election.

== Results by division ==
=== Bass ===
1989 Tasmanian state election: Bass
Party	Candidate	Votes	%	±%
Quota		6,740		
Liberal	Frank Madill (elected 1)	9,180	17.0	+8.4
Liberal	John Beswick (elected 6)	4,516	8.4	+1.1
Liberal	Peter Rae	4,440	8.2	−12.5
Liberal	Neil Robson (elected 7)	4,032	7.5	−1.0
Liberal	Leon Miller	1,978	3.7	+3.7
Liberal	Malcolm Carins	825	1.5	+1.5
Liberal	David Fry	533	1.0	+1.0
Labor	Peter Patmore (elected 3)	4,853	9.0	−1.2
Labor	Harry Holgate (elected 4)	3,683	6.8	−4.3
Labor	Jim Cox (elected 5)	3,288	6.1	+6.1
Labor	Gill James	3,036	5.6	−1.8
Labor	Richard Taylor	2,125	3.9	+3.9
Labor	Helen Polley	1,537	2.9	+2.9
Labor	Geoff Sweet	1,369	2.5	+2.5
Labor	John Swallow	298	0.6	+0.6
Independent Greens	Lance Armstrong (elected 2)	6,527	12.1	+12.1
Independent Greens	Patricia Ratcliff	651	1.2	+1.2
Independent Greens	John Ball	433	0.8	+0.8
Democrats	Kathy Maxwell-Petrovsky	325	0.6	−1.1
Democrats	Michelle-Ronwyn Dowlman	286	0.5	+0.5
Total formal votes		53,915	93.9	+0.5
Informal votes		3,505	6.1	−0.5
Turnout		57,240	92.8	−0.7
Party total votes
Liberal		25,504	47.3	−8.9
Labor		20,189	37.4	0.0
Independent Greens		7,611	14.1	+14.1
Democrats		611	1.1	−5.3

=== Braddon ===
1989 Tasmanian state election: Braddon
Party	Candidate	Votes	%	±%
Quota		6,817		
Liberal	Roger Groom (elected 1)	9,881	18.1	−0.7
Liberal	Tony Rundle (elected 3)	6,807	12.5	+1.7
Liberal	Ron Cornish (elected 4)	5,437	10.0	−1.0
Liberal	Bill Bonde (elected 5)	5,342	9.8	+2.3
Liberal	Carole Cains	1,727	3.2	+3.2
Liberal	Heather Wall	1,157	2.1	+2.1
Liberal	Ron Nankervis	977	1.8	+1.8
Labor	Michael Field (elected 2)	8,486	15.6	+6.9
Labor	Michael Weldon (elected 7)	3,009	5.5	−2.1
Labor	Greg Peart	2,520	4.6	−4.7
Labor	David Currie	884	1.6	+1.6
Labor	Tom Eggleston	775	1.4	+1.4
Labor	David Nettleton	340	0.6	+0.6
Labor	Bruce Tivendale	269	0.5	+0.5
Independent Greens	Di Hollister (elected 6)	5,657	10.4	+10.4
Independent Greens	Peter Walford	339	0.6	+0.6
Independent Greens	Arnold Rowlands	267	0.5	+0.5
Independent	Lawrence Edwards	322	0.6	+0.6
Independent	Ted Nielsen	161	0.3	+0.3
Independent	Heather Benjamin	117	0.2	+0.2
Independent	George Lee	55	0.1	+0.1
Total formal votes		54,529	94.8	0.0
Informal votes		3,017	5.2	0.0
Turnout		57,546	93.6	−1.2
Party total votes
Liberal		31,328	57.5	+2.6
Labor		16,283	29.9	−4.2
Independent Greens		6,263	11.5	+11.5
Independent	Lawrence Edwards	322	0.6	+0.6
Independent	Ted Nielsen	161	0.3	+0.3
Independent	Heather Benjamin	117	0.2	+0.2
Independent	George Lee	55	0.1	+0.1

=== Denison ===
1989 Tasmanian state election: Denison
Party	Candidate	Votes	%	±%
Quota		6,783		
Liberal	Ray Groom (elected 2)	9,775	18.0	+1.7
Liberal	John Bennett (elected 3)	7,525	13.9	+5.1
Liberal	John Barker (elected 4)	1,486	2.7	+0.1
Liberal	Nell Ames	597	1.1	+1.1
Liberal	Chris Gibson	515	0.9	+0.9
Liberal	Tony Steven	469	0.9	+0.9
Liberal	Beth Darcey	443	0.8	+0.8
Labor	John White (elected 6)	4,472	8.2	+2.0
Labor	David Crean (elected 7)	4,114	7.6	+7.6
Labor	Judy Jackson (elected 5)	3,942	7.3	+0.5
Labor	Neil Batt	3,889	7.2	+0.3
Labor	Charles Touber	1,483	2.7	+2.7
Labor	Andrew Daniels	1,356	2.5	+2.5
Labor	Catherine Cuthbert	779	1.4	+1.4
Independent Greens	Bob Brown (elected 1)	11,755	21.7	+6.1
Independent Greens	Michael Lynch	537	1.0	+1.0
Independent Greens	Patsy Jones	236	0.4	+0.4
Independent Greens	Sheena Brookman	197	0.4	+0.4
Democrats	Robert Bell	360	0.7	+0.7
Democrats	June Francis	120	0.2	+0.2
Democrats	Wendy Cuskelly	101	0.2	+0.2
Independent	Anthony Delara	106	0.2	+0.2
Total formal votes		54,257	95.2	+1.3
Informal votes		2,746	4.8	−1.3
Turnout		57,003	91.4	−1.3
Party total votes
Liberal		20,810	38.4	−5.2
Labor		20,035	36.9	+6.1
Independent Greens		12,725	23.5	+4.9
Democrats		581	1.1	+1.1
Independent	Anthony Delara	106	0.2	+0.2

=== Franklin ===
1989 Tasmanian state election: Franklin
Party	Candidate	Votes	%	±%
Quota		6,948		
Liberal	Peter Hodgman (elected 2)	10,132	18.2	+0.5
Liberal	Nick Evers (elected 3)	5,628	10.1	+2.0
Liberal	John Cleary (elected 4)	3,693	6.6	−0.2
Liberal	Brian Davison	884	1.6	+1.6
Liberal	Edyth Langham	855	1.5	+1.5
Liberal	John Peers	642	1.2	+1.2
Liberal	Jane Malecky	466	0.8	+0.8
Labor	Ken Wriedt (elected 6)	4,467	8.0	−8.9
Labor	Paul Lennon	4,267	7.7	+7.7
Labor	Michael Aird (elected 7)	4,197	7.6	+3.5
Labor	Fran Bladel (elected 5)	4,030	7.3	+1.9
Labor	Tony Reidy	2,460	4.4	+4.4
Labor	Ian Abbott	1,458	2.6	+2.6
Labor	Noela Foxcroft	399	0.7	+0.7
Independent Greens	Gerry Bates (elected 1)	10,143	18.2	+7.4
Independent Greens	Megan James	486	0.9	+0.9
Independent Greens	Flora Fox	342	0.6	+0.6
Democrats	Patsy Harmsen	369	0.7	+0.7
Democrats	Kent Rayner	303	0.5	+0.5
Democrats	Peter Walker	184	0.3	+0.3
Independent	Robin Griffiths	176	0.3	+0.3
Total formal votes		55,581	95.1	+0.8
Informal votes		2,860	4.9	−0.8
Turnout		58,441	93.6	−0.4
Party total votes
Liberal		22,300	40.1	−11.5
Labor		21,278	38.3	+1.8
Independent Greens		10,971	19.7	+7.8
Democrats		856	1.5	+1.5
Independent	Robin Griffiths	176	0.3	+0.3

=== Lyons ===
1989 Tasmanian state election: Lyons
Party	Candidate	Votes	%	±%
Quota		6,857		
Liberal	Robin Gray (elected 1)	19,585	35.7	−6.5
Liberal	The Duke of Avram (elected 6)	1,881	3.4	+3.4
Liberal	Ian Braid (elected 4)	1,792	3.3	−0.8
Liberal	Bob Mainwaring	1,435	2.6	−0.3
Liberal	Graeme Page (elected 5)	1,258	2.3	−0.6
Liberal	Ron Limb	1,158	2.1	+2.1
Liberal	Stephen Salter	1,092	2.0	−1.1
Labor	Michael Polley (elected 3)	5,874	10.7	−2.0
Labor	David Llewellyn (elected 7)	3,856	7.0	−2.2
Labor	Terry Field	2,990	5.5	+5.5
Labor	Chris Batt	2,246	4.1	+0.9
Labor	Wendy Carnicelli	1,010	1.8	+1.8
Labor	Gary Whitney	700	1.3	+1.3
Labor	Carole Coppleman	348	0.6	+0.6
Independent Greens	Christine Milne (elected 2)	8,868	16.2	+16.2
Independent Greens	Diane Masters	209	0.4	+0.4
Independent Greens	Laurie Goldsworthy	150	0.3	+0.3
Democrats	Liz Holloway	202	0.4	+0.4
Democrats	Sarah Hancock	201	0.4	+0.4
Total formal votes		54,855	94.3	+0.3
Informal votes		3,310	5.7	−0.3
Turnout		58,165	93.9	−0.3
Party total votes
Liberal		28,201	51.4	−8.0
Labor		17,024	31.0	−5.9
Independent Greens		9,227	16.8	+16.8
Democrats		403	0.7	+0.7

== See also ==
- 1989 Tasmanian state election
- Members of the Tasmanian House of Assembly, 1989–1992
