= Candidates of the 1992 Tasmanian state election =

The 1992 Tasmanian state election was held on 1 February 1992.

== Retiring Members ==
=== Liberal ===
- Neil Robson MHA (Bass)

== House of Assembly ==
Sitting members are shown in bold text. Tickets that elected at least one MHA are highlighted in the relevant colour. Successful candidates are indicated by an asterisk (*).

=== Bass ===
Seven seats were up for election. The Labor Party was defending three seats. The Liberal Party was defending three seats. The Tasmanian Greens were defending one seat.

Labor candidates	Liberal candidates	Greens candidates	Advance Tas candidates	Ungrouped candidates
Charles Barnard; Max Brown; **Jim Cox**; Peter Daniel; Terry Field; **Harry Holgate**; Gill James*; **Peter Patmore***	Rod Beaumont; Tony Benneworth*; **John Beswick***; David Fry; **Frank Madill***; Brian Mantach; Sue Napier*	**Lance Armstrong***; Ross Barwick; John Chester; Nye Evans; Marion Fry; Kristina Hesketh; Kay Thompson	Robin McKendrick; Eric Petrusma	Tony Le Fevre

=== Braddon ===
Seven seats were up for election. The Labor Party was defending two seats. The Liberal Party was defending four seats. The Tasmanian Greens were defending one seat.

Labor candidates	Liberal candidates	Greens candidates	Advance Tas candidates	Ungrouped candidates
Jim Altimira; Colin Berry; **Michael Field***; Neil McConnell; Greg Richardson; Sid Sidebottom; **Michael Weldon**	**Bill Bonde***; Carole Cains*; **Ron Cornish***; **Roger Groom***; Gerald Heathcote; **Tony Rundle***; Tony Van Rooyen	Ian Clare; Richard Donaghey; Nicki Fletcher; **Di Hollister***; Jon Paice; George Sanders; Peter Walford	Gordon Ibbott; Ken Last	Guy Coughlan; Peter Rettke; Wayne Smith

=== Denison ===
Seven seats were up for election. The Labor Party was defending three seats. The Liberal Party was defending three seats. The Tasmanian Greens were defending one seat.

Labor candidates	Liberal candidates	Greens candidates	More Jobs candidates	Advance Tas candidates	Ungrouped candidates
Julian Amos*; **David Crean**; Andrew Daniels; Rosalind Escott; **Judy Jackson***; Charles Touber; **John White***	**John Barker***; Joy Cairns; Peter Dobromilsky; **Chris Gibson**; **Ray Groom***; Michael Hodgman*; Ingrid Wren	Stuart Baird; **Bob Brown***; Dave Heatley; Mary Jenkins; Peg Putt; Rob Valentine; Karen Weldrick	Gordon Dunsby; Brian Sampson	Ruth Butler; Hank Petrusma	Doug Fenton; Mary Guy; Ken Harvey

=== Franklin ===
Seven seats were up for election. The Labor Party was defending three seats. The Liberal Party was defending three seats. The Tasmanian Greens were defending one seat.

Labor candidates	Liberal candidates	Greens candidates	Advance Tas candidates	Ungrouped candidates
**Michael Aird***; **Fran Bladel***; **Paul Lennon***; Andrew MacLeod; Darren Purcell; John Sheppard; David Traynor	**John Cleary***; Claude Conlan; **Brian Davison***; Nigel Grace; **Peter Hodgman***; Tony Shanny; Jane Shoobridge	**Gerry Bates***; Charles Ellis; Mike Foley; Penny King; Eilean Robinson; Eva Ruzicka; Lorraine Wiltshire	Clive Attwater; Philip French; Harry Grimsey	Nigel Abbott; Jane Flach; Grant Goodwin; Malcolm Muir; Chris Munday

=== Lyons ===
Seven seats were up for election. The Labor Party was defending two seats. The Liberal Party was defending four seats. The Tasmanian Greens were defending one seat.

Labor candidates	Liberal candidates	Greens candidates	Advance Tas candidates	Ungrouped candidates
Eugene Alexander; Chris Batt; Peter Gilmore; **David Llewellyn***; **Michael Polley***; Brian Smith; Pat Tate	**Ian Braid***; Malcolm Cleland; **Robin Gray***; **The Duke of Avram**; Bob Mainwaring*; **Graeme Page***; Denise Swan	Phil Forward; Laurie Goldsworthy; Noel Harper; Diane Masters; **Christine Milne***; Jeremy Pearce; Tess Schramm	Bill Chugg; Simon Edmunds; Dudley Parker; Les Whittle	John Davidson; Ian Jamieson

== See also ==
- Members of the Tasmanian House of Assembly, 1989–1992
- Members of the Tasmanian House of Assembly, 1992–1996
