= Members of the Tasmanian House of Assembly, 1979–1982 =

This is a list of members of the Tasmanian House of Assembly, elected at the 1979 state election:

Name	Party	Electorate	Years in office
Dick Adams	Labor	Franklin	1979–1982
Michael Aird	Labor	Franklin	1979–1986, 1989–1995
Dr Julian Amos	Labor	Denison	1976–1986, 1992–1996
Terry Aulich	Labor	Wilmot	1976–1982
Bob Baker^{[2]}	Liberal	Denison	1969–1980
Darrel Baldock	Labor	Wilmot	1972–1987
Eric Barnard^{[1]}	Labor	Franklin	1959–1979
Michael Barnard	Labor	Bass	1969–1986
Neil Batt^{[3]}	Labor	Denison	1969–1980, 1986–1989
John Beattie	Liberal	Franklin	1972–1989
John Beswick	Liberal	Bass	1979–1998
Max Bingham	Liberal	Denison	1969–1984
Ray Bonney	Liberal	Braddon	1972–1986
Ian Braid	Liberal	Wilmot	1969–1972, 1975–1995
Max Bushby	Liberal	Bass	1964–1986
John Cleary	Liberal	Franklin	1979–1986, 1988–1998
Ron Cornish	Liberal	Braddon	1976–1998
John Coughlan	Labor	Braddon	1975–1986
Glen Davies	Labor	Braddon	1972–1986
John Devine	Labor	Denison	1979–1984
Michael Field	Labor	Braddon	1976–1997
Bob Graham^{[3]}	Labor	Denison	1980–1982, 1984–1986
Robin Gray	Liberal	Wilmot	1976–1995
John Green^{[2]}	Labor	Denison	1974–1980
Roger Groom	Liberal	Braddon	1976–1997
Gabriel Haros^{[2]}	Liberal	Denison	1980–1986
Harry Holgate	Labor	Bass	1974–1992
Gill James	Labor	Bass	1976–1989, 1992–2002
Andrew Lohrey	Labor	Wilmot	1972–1986
Doug Lowe	Labor/Independent^{[4]}	Franklin	1969–1986
Robert Mather	Liberal	Denison	1964–1982
Bill McKinnon^{[1]}	Labor	Franklin	1977–1979, 1979–1986
Graeme Page	Liberal	Wilmot	1976–1996
Geoff Pearsall	Liberal	Franklin	1969–1988
Michael Polley	Labor	Wilmot	1972–2014
Neil Robson	Liberal	Bass	1976–1992
Norm Sanders^{[2]}	Democrat	Denison	1980–1983
Michael Weldon	Labor	Braddon	1979–1982, 1986–1992
Mary Willey	Labor/Independent^{[4]}	Bass	1979–1982

^{1} Labor MHA Eric Barnard resigned on 7 August 1979. Bill McKinnon was elected on the resulting countback.
^{2} The results of the 1979 state election in the seat of Denison were overturned by the Supreme Court of Tasmania on 18 December 1979. A by-election was thus held on 16 February 1980. Five members were re-elected, but Labor MHA John Green and Liberal MHA Bob Baker lost their seats to Democrat Norm Sanders and Liberal Gabriel Haros.
^{3} Labor MHA Neil Batt resigned on 29 August 1980. Bob Graham was elected in the resulting countback.
^{4} Labor Premier Doug Lowe was deposed by his caucus on 11 November 1981 and replaced by Harry Holgate. Lowe and fellow Labor MHA Mary Willey immediately resigned from the party in protest and served out their term as an independents.
