= 1980 Denison state by-election =

- 16 February 1980

All 7 seats for the Division of Denison in the House of Assembly 4 seats needed for a majority
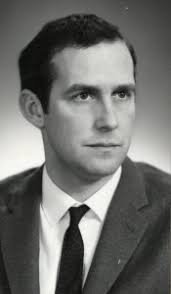

	First party	Second party	Third party
			DEM
Leader	Doug Lowe	Geoff Pearsall	Norm Sanders
Party	Labor	Liberal	Democrats
Seats before	4 seats	3 seats	0 seats
Seats won	3	3	1
Seat change	▼1	Steady	▲1
First preference vote	21,615	20,309	4,292
Percentage	46.4%	43.6%	9.2%
Swing	▼4.3pp	▲1.6pp	▲1.8pp

A by-election for the Tasmanian House of Assembly was held in the Division of Denison in the Australian state of Tasmania on Saturday 16 February 1980.

== Background ==
The election was the first to use the Robson Rotation, a method of rotating names on ballot papers. In previous elections, candidates were listed in alphabetical order by surname.

By-elections are not usually held in the Tasmanian House of Assembly because casual vacancies are filled by a countback of votes, a system that has been in place since 1917.

On 18 December 1979 the Supreme Court of Tasmania ordered that the election of three candidates in the 1979 election be declared void. The court found that Julian Amos, John Devine and John Green had exceeded their spending limits. As a result, all elected members for the electorate of Denison were required to face another election.

== Elected members ==
The election resulted in two previously elected members losing their seats: John Green from the Labor Party and Bob Baker from the Liberal Party. Elected in their place were Norm Sanders from the Democrats and Liberal Gabriel Haros.

The following candidates were elected, listed in order of election:

Order	Name	Party
1	Neil Batt	Labor
2	Max Bingham	Liberal
3	Gabriel Haros	Liberal
4	Julian Amos	Labor
5	John Devine	Labor
6	Robert Mather	Liberal
7	Norm Sanders	Democrats

== Result ==
1980 Denison state by-election
Party	Candidate	Votes	%	±%
Quota		5,819		
Labor	Neil Batt (elected 1)	8,272	17.8	+5.2
Labor	John Devine (elected 5)	4,346	9.3	−2.4
Labor	Julian Amos (elected 4)	3,928	8.4	−3.6
Labor	John Green	2,325	5.0	−2.8
Labor	Bob Graham	2,108	4.5	−0.6
Labor	Stan Joiner	332	0.7	+0.7
Labor	Norm Hanscombe	304	0.7	+0.3
Liberal	Max Bingham (elected 2)	5,960	12.8	−12.9
Liberal	Gabriel Haros (elected 3)	5,658	12.2	+7.4
Liberal	Robert Mather (elected 6)	2,160	4.6	+0.8
Liberal	Geoff Davis	1,616	3.5	+0.5
Liberal	Bob Baker	1,540	3.3	+1.6
Liberal	Max Robinson	1,364	2.9	+1.5
Liberal	Doug Clark	1,194	2.6	+2.6
Liberal	Terry Bower	462	1.0	+0.5
Liberal	Alan Hughes	355	0.8	+0.8
Democrats	Norm Sanders (elected 7)	2,798	6.0	+1.8
Democrats	Peter Brown	466	1.0	+1.0
Democrats	Rod Broadby	422	0.9	−1.9
Democrats	Elizabeth Holloway	206	0.4	+0.4
Democrats	Andrew Langlinger	149	0.3	+0.3
Democrats	John Harrison	130	0.3	+0.3
Democrats	Bruce Kent	121	0.3	+0.3
Christian Democrats	Hellen Kelly	168	0.4	+0.4
Christian Democrats	Stephen Shelley	167	0.4	+0.4
Total formal votes		46,551	94.8	−1.5
Informal votes		2,538	5.2	+1.5
Turnout		49,089	90.0	−2.4
Party total votes
Labor		21,615	46.4	−4.3
Liberal		20,309	43.6	+1.6
Democrats		4,292	9.2	+1.8
Christian Democrats		335	0.7	+0.7
