= Members of the Tasmanian House of Assembly, 1989–1992 =

This is a list of members of the Tasmanian House of Assembly, elected at the 1989 state election:

Name	Party	Electorate	Years in office
Michael Aird	Labor	Franklin	1979–1986, 1989–1995
Lance Armstrong	Greens	Bass	1989–1996
The Duke of Avram	Liberal	Lyons	1989–1992
John Barker	Liberal	Denison	1987–1996
Gerry Bates	Greens^{[1]}	Franklin	1986–1995
John Bennett^{[2]}	Liberal	Denison	1986–1990
John Beswick	Liberal	Bass	1979–1998
Fran Bladel	Labor	Franklin	1986–2002
Bill Bonde	Liberal	Braddon	1986–2002
Ian Braid	Liberal	Lyons	1969–1972, 1975–1995
Bob Brown	Greens^{[1]}	Denison	1983–1993
John Cleary	Liberal	Franklin	1979–1986, 1988–1998
Ron Cornish	Liberal	Braddon	1976–1998
Jim Cox	Labor	Bass	1989–1992, 1996–2010
David Crean	Labor	Denison	1989–1992
Brian Davison^{[3]}	Liberal	Franklin	1990–1996
Nick Evers^{[3]}	Liberal	Franklin	1986–1990
Michael Field	Labor	Braddon	1976–1997
Chris Gibson^{[2]}	Liberal	Denison	1990–1992
Robin Gray	Liberal	Lyons	1976–1995
Ray Groom	Liberal	Denison	1986–2001
Roger Groom	Liberal	Braddon	1976–1997
Peter Hodgman	Liberal	Franklin	1986–2001
Harry Holgate	Labor	Bass	1974–1992
Di Hollister	Greens^{[1]}	Braddon	1989–1998
Judy Jackson	Labor	Denison	1986–2006
Paul Lennon^{[4]}	Labor	Franklin	1990–2008
David Llewellyn	Labor	Lyons	1986–2010, 2014–2018
Frank Madill	Liberal	Bass	1986–2000
Christine Milne	Greens^{[1]}	Lyons	1989–1998
Graeme Page	Liberal	Lyons	1976–1996
Peter Patmore	Labor	Bass	1984–2002
Michael Polley	Labor	Lyons	1972–2014
Neil Robson	Liberal	Bass	1976–1992
Tony Rundle	Liberal	Braddon	1986–2002
Michael Weldon	Labor	Braddon	1979–1982, 1986–1992
John White	Labor	Denison	1986–1998
Ken Wriedt^{[4]}	Labor	Franklin	1982–1990

^{1} The five cross-bench members were elected as environment-oriented independents, but officially united together to form the Tasmanian Greens during the course of this parliament.
^{2} Liberal member John Bennett resigned in early 1990. Chris Gibson was elected as his replacement on 15 February.
^{3} Liberal member Nick Evers resigned in mid–1990. Brian Davison was elected as his replacement on 6 August.
^{4} Labor member Ken Wriedt resigned in late 1990. Paul Lennon was elected as his replacement on 15 October.
