= 1982 Tasmanian state election =

State election in Australia

- 15 May 1982

All 35 seats to the House of Assembly 18 seats needed for a majority
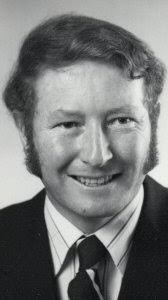

	First party	Second party	Third party
			DEM
Leader	Robin Gray	Harry Holgate	Norm Sanders
Party	Liberal	Labor	Democrats
Leader since	10 November 1981	11 November 1981
Leader's seat	Wilmot	Bass	Denison
Last election	15 seats	20 seats	0 seats
Seats won	19	14	1
Seat change	▲4	▼6	▲1
Percentage	48.52%	36.86%	5.39%
Swing	▲7.21	▼17.46	▲2.52
- Results of the election
Premier before election
Harry Holgate
Labor
Elected Premier
Robin Gray
Liberal

The 1982 Tasmanian state election was held on 15 May 1982 in the Australian state of Tasmania to elect 35 members of the Tasmanian House of Assembly. The election used the Hare-Clark proportional representation system — seven members were elected from each of five electorates. The quota required for election was 12.5% in each division.

The incumbent Labor Party, in power since 1972 and led by Premier Harry Holgate, was defeated in a landslide by the opposition Liberal Party, led by Robin Gray.

== Background ==
=== Franklin Dam controversy, ouster of Doug Lowe ===
In 1978, the Hydro-Electric Commission (HEC) proposed the construction of a hydroelectricity dam on the Gordon River. The location of the proposed dam was below the Gordon's junction with the Franklin River, and the flooding caused by damming the river would have destroyed the environmentally sensitive Franklin River valley area. Responding to community concern over the proposal, Labor Premier Doug Lowe ordered a moratorium on dam construction and an environmental impact study.

With the community polarised over the proposed dam's environmental impact and Tasmania's economic and employment needs, Lowe proposed a compromise: to construct the dam at a different point on the Gordon, above the junction with the Olga River (Gordon-above-Olga). Lowe was successful in getting the Gordon-above-Olga plan through the Tasmanian House of Assembly, however the more conservative upper house, the Tasmanian Legislative Council, voted to block the legislation and insisted on the HEC's original Gordon-below-Franklin plan.

With a parliamentary deadlock over the issue, Lowe was left with no option but to call for a referendum for December 1981. When announcing the referendum to the media, he was questioned as to whether it would include a 'No Dams' option and he indicated it would. The President of the Labor Party in Tasmania wrote to all Labor MHAs instructing them to withdraw that option, and Lowe was forced into an embarrassing backdown.

About a month before the referendum was held, the Labor caucus passed a no-confidence motion in Doug Lowe on 11 November 1981. Lowe resigned as Premier, then left the Labor party to become an independent, along with Labor whip, Mary Willey. The Labor government lost its majority in the House.

The Labor caucus selected Harry Holgate as the new Premier. The December referendum resulted in the Gordon-below-Franklin dam option receiving the most votes. Holgate, who had prorogued the House while the referendum was conducted, pledged the government would proceed with the dam construction.

=== Vote of no confidence ===
When the parliament resumed on 26 March 1982, Democrat MHA Dr Norm Sanders moved a motion of no-confidence in Holgate's government. Independents Doug Lowe and Mary Willey joined Sanders and the Liberal opposition to bring down the government by a vote of 18-16. Holgate advised Governor Sir Stanley Burbury to dissolve the House for an early election on 15 May 1982.

== Results ==
The Australian Democrats contested all electorates. Independent Green candidates contested the electorate of Denison only.

The pro-dam Liberal Party won a comfortable majority. Not only was this only the second time in 48 years that Labor had been out of office in Tasmania, but it was the first time in 51 years that the main non-Labor party in Tasmania had won an outright majority at an election. The Democrats' Norm Sanders retained his seat, which had originally been won at the Denison state by-election in 1980. Former Labor premier Doug Lowe also retained his seat as an independent.

Party	Votes	%	+/–	Seats	+/–
Liberal	121,346	48.52	+7.21	19	▲4
Labor	92,184	36.86	-17.46	14	▼6
Democrats	13,476	5.39	+2.52	1	▲1
Ind. Labor^{[a]}	12,432	4.97	+4.97	1	▲1
Independents	6,385	2.55	+1.05	0	Steady
Ind. Green^{[b]}	4,273	1.71	+1.71	0	Steady
Total	250,096	100.00	–	35	–
Valid votes	250,096	94.32			
Invalid/blank votes	15,055	5.68	+1.81		
Total votes	265,151	100.00	–		
Registered voters/turnout	283,549	93.51	-0.27		

Popular vote
Liberal	48.52%
Labor	36.86%
Democrats	5.39%
Independents	9.23%

Seats
Liberal	54.29%
Labor	40.00%
Democrats	2.86%
Independents	2.86%

^{a} The Independent Labor label refers to the separate campaigns by former Premier Doug Lowe and Labor MHA Mary Willey.
^{b} The Green vote referred to here is Bob Brown's campaign in the seat of Denison, where he attained 8.6% of the vote.

== Distribution of votes ==
=== Primary vote by division ===
	Bass	Braddon	Denison	Franklin	Wilmot
Labor Party	36.6%	41.3%	28.6%	36.1%	41.8%
Liberal Party	50.3%	49.8%	48.8%	43.1%	50.8%
Democrats	3.9%	4.0%	10.3%	5.2%	3.6%
Other	9.2%	4.9%	12.3%	15.7%	3.8%

=== Distribution of seats ===
Electorate	Seats won
Bass	
Braddon	
Denison	
Franklin	
Wilmot	

Labor
Liberal
Democrats
Independent

== Aftermath ==
Harry Holgate was succeeded by former federal Labor minister Ken Wriedt as Labor leader on 27 May.

Democrat Norm Sanders resigned in late 1982 and independent Green Bob Brown was elected as his replacement after a recount of votes.

== See also ==
- Members of the Tasmanian House of Assembly, 1982–1986
- Candidates of the 1982 Tasmanian state election
