= Chris Gibson (Australian politician) =

Australian politician

Christopher Arthur Gibson (born 24 May 1951) is a former Australian politician. He was born in Cessnock, New South Wales. Having moved to Tasmania, he contested the 1989 state election as a Liberal candidate for Denison, but was unsuccessful. However, sitting Liberal member John Bennett resigned in 1990 and Gibson was elected in the countback held on 19 February. He held the seat until his defeat at the 1992 state election.
