= 1979 Tasmanian state election =

State election in Australia

- 28 July 1979

All 35 seats to the House of Assembly 18 seats needed for a majority
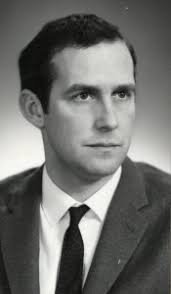

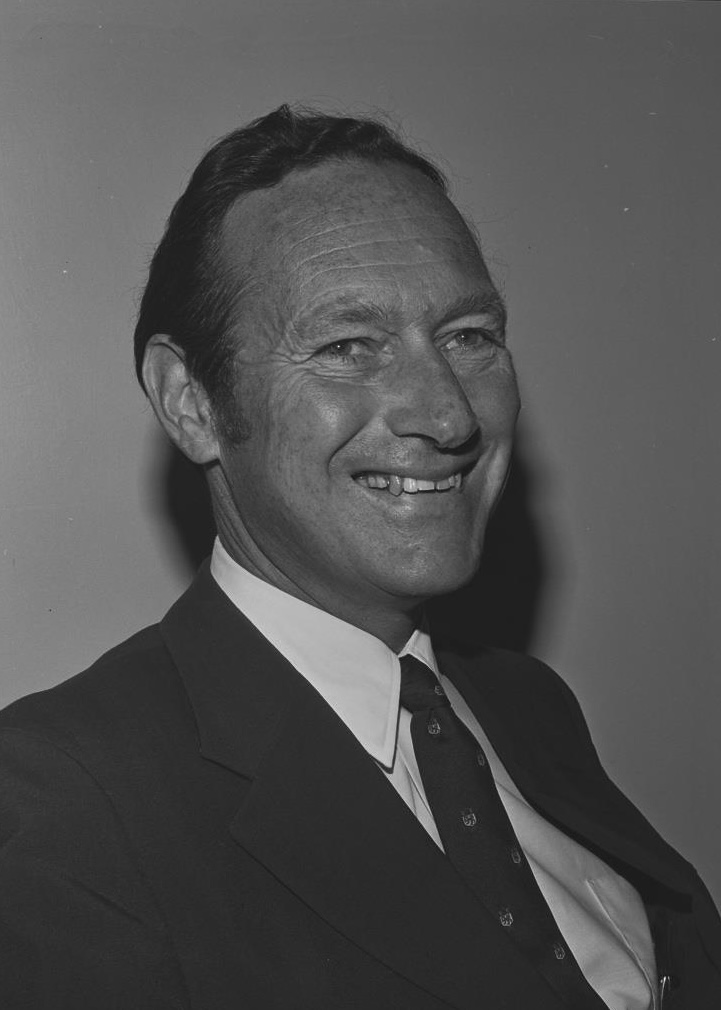
	First party	Second party
Leader	Doug Lowe	Max Bingham
Party	Labor	Liberal
Leader since	1 December 1977	4 May 1972
Leader's seat	Franklin	Denison
Last election	18 seats	17 seats
Seats won	20	15
Seat change	▲2	▼2
Percentage	54.32%	41.31%
Swing	▲1.84	▼3.18
- Results of the election
Premier before election
Doug Lowe
Labor
Elected Premier
Doug Lowe
Labor

The 1979 Tasmanian state election was held on 28 July 1979 in the Australian state of Tasmania to elect 35 members of the Tasmanian House of Assembly. The election used the Hare-Clark proportional representation system — seven members were elected from each of five electorates. The quota required for election was 12.5% in each division.

The incumbent Labor Party, led by Doug Lowe, won a third term in office against the opposition Liberal Party, led by Max Bingham.

== Background ==
Bill Neilson, leader of the Labor Party and Premier of Tasmania, had retired on 1 December 1977 and been replaced by Doug Lowe.

The United Tasmania Group, which had contested the two previous elections, did not field any candidates for the 1979 election. Instead a new party, the Australian Democrats, founded by Don Chipp in 1977, emerged as the most significant minor party.

== Results ==
The Labor Party won the election, increasing its majority in the House of Assembly from one seat to five.

Doug Lowe received the highest personal vote ever in the House of Assembly: 24,971 or 51.2% of the vote in the seat of Franklin.

Party	Votes	%	+/–	Seats	+/–
Labor	129,973	54.32	+1.84	20	▲2
Liberal	98,845	41.31	-3.18	15	▼2
Democrats	6,858	2.87	New	0	New
Independents	3,608	1.51	+0.68	0	Steady
Total	239,284	100.00	–	35	–
Valid votes	239,284	96.15			
Invalid/blank votes	9,582	3.85	+0.05		
Total votes	248,866	100.00	–		
Registered voters/turnout	265,428	93.76	-0.78		

Popular vote
Labor	54.32%
Liberal	41.31%
Democrats	2.87%
Independents	1.51%

Seats
Labor	57.14%
Liberal	42.86%

== Distribution of votes ==
=== Primary vote by division ===
	Bass	Braddon	Denison	Franklin	Wilmot
Labor Party	50.3%	54.2%	50.7%	60.8%	55.6%
Liberal Party	44.7%	42.7%	42.0%	33.9%	43.5%
Other	5.0%	3.1%	7.4%	5.4%	0.9%

=== Distribution of seats ===
Electorate	Seats won
Bass	
Braddon	
Denison	
Franklin	
Wilmot	

Labor
Liberal

== Aftermath ==
Max Bingham resigned as opposition leader after losing his second election, and was replaced by Geoff Pearsall.

The election of three Labor MPs for Denison (Julian Amos, John Devine and John Green) was ruled invalid, due to the enforcement of a previously ignored rule limiting campaign expenditure to $1,500. A by-election was arranged for Denison in February 1980. The placement of the Labor candidates on the ballot paper, which placed Deputy Premier Neil Batt fourth, was believed to have led to the introduction of the Robson Rotation method of randomising ballot ordering.

== See also ==
- Members of the Tasmanian House of Assembly, 1979–1982
- Candidates of the 1979 Tasmanian state election
