= Bob Baker (politician) =

Australian politician (9 April 1917 – 3 July 1985)

Bob Baker QC

Member of the Tasmanian House of Assembly for Denison
- In office 10 May 1969 – 16 February 1980
- Succeeded by: Gabriel Haros

Personal details
- Born: Robert Wilfred Baker; 9 April 1917 Adelaide, South Australia
- Died: 3 July 1985 (aged 68) Hobart, Tasmania
- Party: Liberal
- Spouse: Alison Burton (m. 1946; died 1985)
- Children: Barbara Baker
- Education: University of Tasmania; Lincoln College, Oxford
- Profession: Lawyer • legal scholar

Military service
- Allegiance: Australia
- Branch/service: Royal Australian Navy
- Years of service: 1940–1945
- Rank: Lieutenant

Robert Wilfred Baker (9 April 1917 – 3 July 1985) was an Australian lawyer, legal scholar and politician, who was elected to the Tasmanian House of Assembly in 1969 as a Liberal member for Denison. He held his seat until 1980, when the results of the 1979 state election were voided and a by-election was held, in which Baker lost his seat to fellow Liberal Gabriel Haros.

== Early life and education ==
Baker was born in Adelaide, South Australia in April 1917 to labour relations manager Cecil Roy Baker and author Alice Daisy Turner. The family moved to Tasmania in 1919, where Baker was educated at Moonah State School and Hobart High School, before gaining a Bachelor of Laws from the University of Tasmania in 1939 whilst working as an articled clerk. In December that year, Baker was selected as Tasmania's Rhodes Scholar for 1940, but postponed his studies to enlist in the Royal Australian Navy from 1940 to 1945 during World War II, obtaining the rank of lieutenant. After the war, Baker returned to Oxford to study a Bachelor of Civil Law (1946) and Bachelor of Letters (1947) at Lincoln College.

== Legal career ==
Following his graduation from Oxford, Baker returned to Tasmania where he worked as a lawyer and joined the University of Tasmania in 1947 as a professor in the law faculty where he worked until 1959, also spending two years in the United States as a visiting scholar under the Carnegie Travel Award.

In 1958, Baker joined the Hobart law firm Piggott, Jennings & Wood (later Piggott Wood & Baker). He was named Queen's Counsel in 1977, and returned to the University of Tasmania in 1981 to work as a lecturer at the law school and then at the School of Legal Practice at the Tasmanian College of Advanced Education from 1982 until his death in 1985.

== Bibliography ==
As a requirement for his Bachelor of Letters degree, Baker completed a thesis under the supervision of Arthur Lehman Goodhart. His thesis, The Hearsay Rule, was accepted and was published by Pitman in 1950.

In 1983, Baker wrote and self-published a memoir, Tasmania Now and Again.

== Personal life ==
Baker was an amateur but accomplished sportsman, in spite of a partly disabled right forearm which prevented him from joining the British military during World War II. He played Australian rules football, but specialised in tennis, both the lawn and royal tennis varieties. In 1946, he and partner Tim Miles played in the first round of the 1946 Wimbledon Championships – Men's Doubles. He left Oxford with a full blue in lawn tennis, having captained the university's team.

During his navy service, Baker met fellow tennis player Alison Burton in Melbourne, and they married in Oxford when he returned there to study. Their daughter, Barbara Baker, became the 29th Governor of Tasmania in June 2021.
