= Vince Smith (politician) =

Australian politician

Vincent John "Vince" Smith (28 February 1938 – 24 April 2008) was an Australian politician.

Smith was born in London. In 1982 he was elected to the Tasmanian Legislative Assembly as a Liberal member for Braddon, serving until his defeat in 1986.
