= Nigel Abbott =

Australian politician (1920 – 2011)

The Honourable Nigel Abbott AM

Minister for Health and Road Safety
- In office 26 May 1969 – 21 March 1972
- Preceded by: Merv Everett (as Minister for Health)
- Succeeded by: Max Bingham

Member of the Tasmanian House of Assembly for Denison
- In office 2 May 1964 – 22 April 1972

Personal details
- Born: Nigel Drury Gresley Abbott; 29 March 1920 Clunes, Victoria
- Died: 13 November 2011 (aged 91) Hobart, Tasmania
- Party: Liberal Party
- Spouse: Jocelyn Ruth Butler (m. 1948)
- Education: Hutchins School; St Peter's College, Adelaide; University of Tasmania; University of Adelaide
- Profession: Medical doctor

Military service
- Allegiance: Australia
- Branch/service: Australian Army
- Years of service: 1942–1948, 1968
- Rank: Lieutenant Colonel
- Unit: British Commonwealth Occupation Force, 10th Field Ambulance
- Battles/wars: World War II; Vietnam War

Nigel Drury Gresley Abbott AM (29 March 1920 – 13 November 2011) was an Australian politician. He was a Liberal member of the Tasmanian House of Assembly from 1964 to 1972, representing the seat of Denison. Tasmania's first Minister for Road Safety, he resigned from the Liberal Party to stand as an independent after failing to get his road safety measures approved by the party.

== Early life and education ==
Abbott was born in the town of Clunes, near Ballarat in Victoria. He moved to Tasmania with his family when his father, a doctor, started a medical practice in the Huon Valley. He was educated at a public high school in Geeveston, then at the Anglican private school Hutchins in Hobart, and completing his secondary education at St Peter's College, Adelaide in 1937.

Following his father into a medical career, Abbott studied the first year of a medical degree at the University of Tasmania before moving to the University of Adelaide, from where he graduated MBBS in 1944. During his studies, he played six games of Australian rules football for South Adelaide in the SANFL.
He was later involved for many years with the Hobart Football Club as the club's doctor, also serving a term as President of the club in 1960 and was still involved in the club for his medical help as late as 1999.

== Military service ==
In January 1942 in Adelaide, Abbott enlisted in the Australian Army and served as a private in the 6th Cavalry Ambulance unit. In July 1945 in Brighton, Tasmania, he enlisted in the Australian Imperial Force (AIF), and saw service with the British Commonwealth Occupation Force in post-war Japan. Upon his discharge with the rank of captain in July 1948, he joined the Citizen Military Forces and was commanding officer of the 10th Field Ambulance.

As a lieutenant colonel, Abbott served for three months in 1968 as head of a military aid mission during the Vietnam War. He implemented a new malaria prophylaxis regimen, which was later adopted across all Australian and American forces in Vietnam.

== Medical career ==
Following his military service, Abbott returned to Tasmania where he resumed his medical career, working as a consulting physician at the Royal Hobart Hospital and later Queenstown Hospital. He then worked as a general practitioner at Zeehan before returning to Hobart to operate a GP practice at Kingston.

== Political career ==
Abbott entered politics at a local government level, serving as an alderman on the Hobart City Council from 1962 to 1964.

At the Tasmanian state election in 1964, Abbott was elected as a member of the Tasmanian House of Assembly, representing the electorate of Denison for the Liberal Party.

When the Liberal Party led by Angus Bethune formed an alliance with Kevin Lyons' Centre Party in 1969, the Labor government of Eric Reece lost its majority in the House of Assembly, and Bethune became Premier of Tasmania. Abbott was appointed to Bethune's cabinet, serving as Minister for Health and taking on a new portfolio of Road Safety.

On 27 September 1971, Abbott announced he had resigned as road safety minister after the Tasmanian Legislative Council voted down what he saw as vital legislation on road safety, introducing on-the-spot fines for traffic offences and a demerit point system. He had previously promised to resign if he could not successfully lower the state's road toll, which by September had already exceeded the number of road deaths in 1970. Bethune's cabinet met the next day, and after a two-and-a-half hour meeting, convinced Abbott to withdraw his resignation and return to work.

Five months later, the Liberal–Centre coalition collapsed when Lyons resigned as Deputy Premier and withdrew his support for the Liberals, triggering the 1972 election. In the week after Lyons' resignation, Abbott also resigned as a minister after not getting the assurance of support he sought from the party for his road safety reforms. Abbott's portfolios were assigned to the state attorney-general Max Bingham until the election. Abbott announced he would not contest the 1972 election, but ended up contesting Denison as an ungrouped independent candidate, however he was not elected.

He returned to local government in 1988, serving as an alderman on Kingborough Council until 1996. In the Queen's Birthday Honours in 1994, he was made a Member of the Order of Australia (AM) for service to the community, particularly through local government and to the Tasmanian Parliament.

== Personal life ==
Abbott's father, also named Dr Nigel Abbott, was a medical doctor who was involved with the conservative Nationalist Party (a precursor to the Liberal Party)—Abbott senior was an endorsed Nationalist candidate for the seat of Franklin at the 1934 Tasmanian state election, but failed to nominate by the deadline.

On 27 August 1948, Abbott married Jocelyn Ruth Butler at South Yarra, Melbourne. They had six children: Tony, Deb, Clive, Geoff, Rick and Felicity. Felicity was killed in a road accident in 1952, which inspired Abbott's commitment to road safety as a campaigner and later as a government minister.

Political offices
Preceded by Merv Everett as Minister for Health	Minister for Health and Road Safety; 1969–1972	Succeeded by Max Bingham
