= Judy Jackson =

Australian politician

Judith Louise Jackson AM (born 31 August 1947 in Hobart) is an Australian former Labor Party politician, in Tasmania from 1986 to 2006. She was the first female attorney-general of Tasmania and also served as the Minister for Environment in the Tasmanian Government. During her time in parliament, she was a member of the Hobart-based seat of Denison.

== Political career ==
Before her entry into parliament, Jackson graduate from the University of Tasmania with a Bachelor of Arts, Diploma of Education and Bachelor of Laws. Jackson commenced work as a school teacher. She entered parliament in 1986, despite not coming from a union or political family. She held a number of portfolios including; Minister for Community Services (1989), Minister for Roads and Transport (1991), Shadow Attorney-General (1996–1998) and Minister for Health and Human Services. Jackson is a committed feminist and has worked tirelessly to bring equal opportunity to women in Tasmania. As Attorney-General, Jackson drafted several laws including The Family Violence Act which outlawed domestic violence in Tasmania and the Relationships Act which made it possible for non-married (including homosexual) couples to register a union and obtain similar rights as married couples.

=== Criticism ===
Jackson had many critics; the Risdon prison siege in 2005 caused much controversy and she was widely blamed as not handling the situation.

In 2005 the Family Violence Act she drafted was criticised by judges as one of the provisions in the legislation prevented courts from granting bail to alleged domestic violence offenders, as well as the points system used discriminating against people of different ethnic or lower socio-economic backgrounds. However Jackson remained firm about the issue and the legislation was introduced, unchanged.

In 2005 the government also drafted the Sex Regulation Act which sought to further legalise and regulate prostitution. Under the legislation, brothels in Tasmania would be legal and could be owned by any individual except convicted criminals, patrons of prostitution would be required by law to wear a condom. However Jackson was unable to convince the community and members of the Tasmanian Legislative Council rejected her bill. As a result, she made a back flip; abandoning her legislation and banning brothels in Tasmania. Jackson faced criticism from both sides; sex workers and supporters fearing that prostitution will go underground and others for supporting prostitution in the first place. Jackson, in a statement, revealed how she felt that regulation of the industry was better than banning it altogether.

As Environment Minister she was highly criticised by the Tasmanian Greens for inaction over the devil facial tumour disease, a transmissible cancer that occurs in Tasmanian devils.

=== Retirement ===
In 2005, Jackson announced she would not contest her seat during the 2006 state election and retired when her term ended on 17 March 2006.

== Recognition and awards ==
In 2009 Jackson was inducted to the Tasmanian Honour Roll of Women for service to Government and to Human Rights. She was appointed a Member of the Order of Australia in the 2023 King's Birthday Honours for "significant service to the people and Parliament of Tasmania".

Political offices
Preceded by John Bennett as Minister for Lands, Parks and Wildlife	Minister for Parks, Wildlife and Heritage (Tasmania); 1989–1992	Succeeded by John Cleary
Preceded by Roger Groom as Minister for Community Welfare and the Elderly	Minister for Community Services (Tasmania); 1989–1992	Succeeded by Roger Groom
Preceded by Harry Holgate	Minister for Roads and Transport (Tasmania); 1991–1992	Succeeded by Frank Madill
Preceded by Peter Patmore	Attorney-General of Tasmania; 2002–2006	Succeeded by Steve Kons
