= Max Robinson (politician) =

Australian politician (1932–2014)

Maxwell Keith Robinson (15 December 1932 – 31 March 2014) was an Australian politician.

He was born in Hobart. In 1976, he was elected to the Tasmanian House of Assembly as a Liberal member for Denison. He was defeated in 1979.
