= John Barker (Australian politician) =

Australian politician

John Scott Barker (born 3 July 1947) is a former Australian politician. He was born in Hobart. In 1987, he was elected to the Tasmanian House of Assembly as a Liberal Party for Denison; he was elected in a countback following the resignation of Geoff Davis. He served as Chairman of Committees 1992 to 1995 and a minister 1995 to 1996. Barker was defeated in 1996.
