= Carmel Holmes =

Australian politician (1945–2021)

Carmel Maude Holmes (5 December 1945 – 7 November 2021) was an Australian politician.

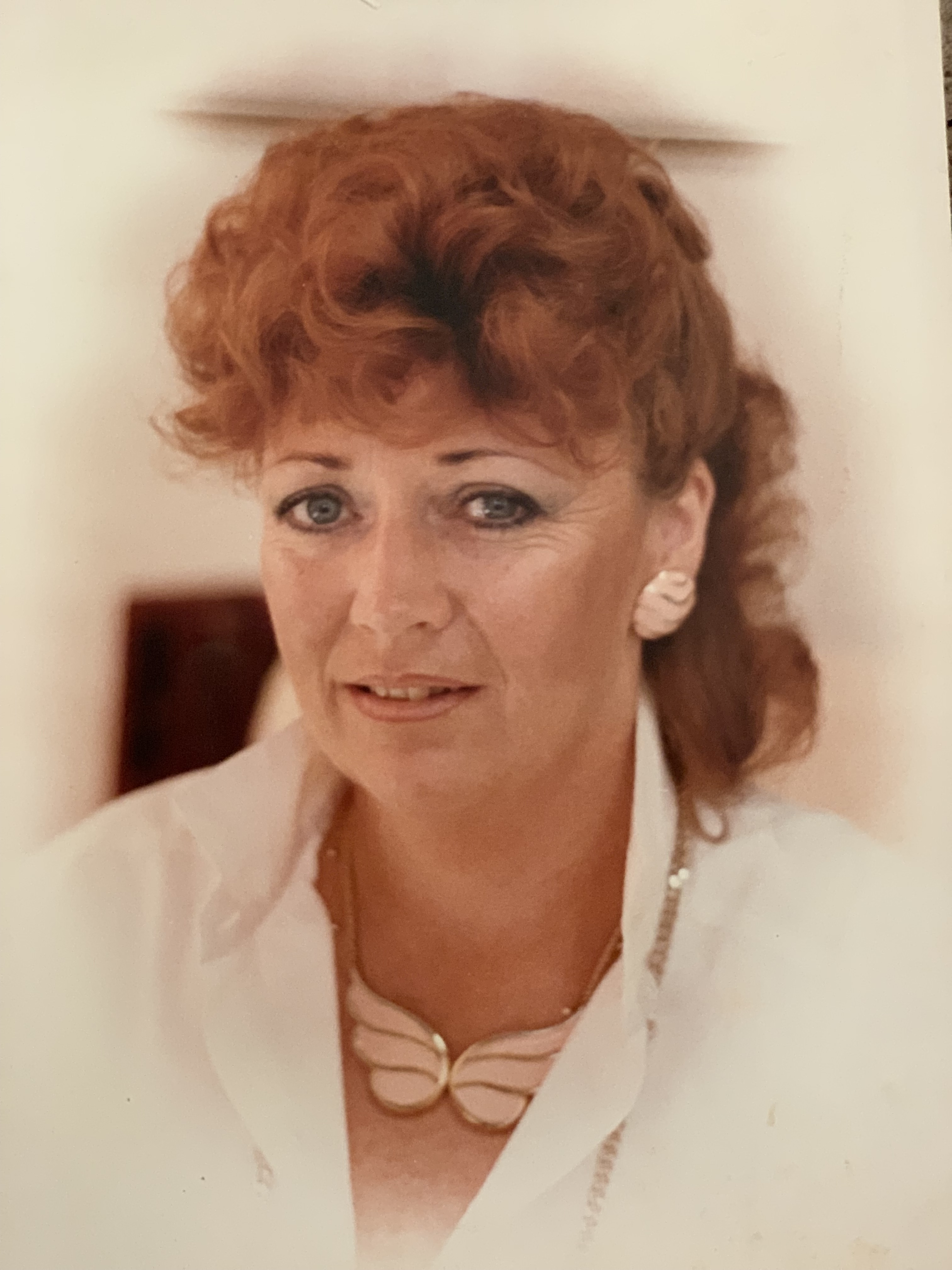
Carmel Holmes - 1984

Holmes was born in Winnaleah, a small country town in the North East of Tasmania where her parents and grand parents farmed and ran a dairy herd. She attended St Thomas More's Ladies College in Launceston.

At the age of 19 she started a recruitment business. In 1976 Carmel Clark married Charles Holmes and in 1978 they moved from Launceston to Hobart to expand their business and open a branch of Holmes Consulting Group which specialized in Personnel Management, Executive Search, Training and Development. In 1982 Holmes was named the Tasmanian Businesswoman of the Year.

In 1984 she was elected as a Liberal to the Tasmanian House of Assembly in a countback for the seat of Denison following the resignation of the former Deputy Premier, Max Bingham.

Her areas of interest were Employment, Youth Affairs, Small Business and Community Welfare. Although she supported Government policy on almost all occasions, she was not afraid to speak her mind and exercised her right to do so over the re-location of Nurses training from being hospital based and the proposal of a Nurses training college to be solely located in the north of the state. She was interested in women's issues but did not want to be slotted into a particular role because of her gender. An early election was called in 1986 and Holmes lost her seat.

She then returned to world of business and went on to develop and refurbish a flour mill in Hobart and old Granary in Launceston into serviced offices.

She died on 7 November 2021.
