= Peter Walker (Australian politician) =

Australian politician

Peter Benson Walker (8 May 1922 – 14 July 1987) was an Australian politician.

He was born in Hobart. In 1982 he was elected to the Tasmanian House of Assembly as a Liberal member for Denison, but he was defeated in 1986. He died the following year.
