= John Bennett (Australian politician) =

Australian politician (1942–2019)

John Myles Bennett (19 July 1942 – 8 October 2019) was an Australian politician. He was born in Hobart, Tasmania, and held a Bachelor of Law. In the 1986 state election, he was elected to the Tasmanian House of Assembly as a Liberal member for Denison, and he served as a minister from 1986 to 1989. Bennett resigned from parliament on 30 January 1990.
