= Robert Mather (Australian politician) =

Australian politician (1914–2002)

Robert Mather CBE (28 September 1914 – 5 February 2002) was an Australian politician.

He was born in Hobart. In 1964 he was elected to the Tasmanian House of Assembly as a Liberal member for Denison. He served until his retirement in 1982. He was appointed a Commander of the Order of the British Empire in 1984.
