= Neil Batt =

Australian politician (born 1937)

The Honourable Neil Batt AO

National President of the Labor Party
- In office 2 August 1978 – 8 September 1980
- Preceded by: Bob Hawke
- Succeeded by: Neville Wran

7th Deputy Premier of Tasmania
- In office 1 December 1977 – 18 December 1979
- Preceded by: Doug Lowe
- In office 25 February 1980 – 29 August 1980
- Succeeded by: Michael Barnard
- Constituency: Denison

Personal details
- Born: Neil Leonard Charles Batt; 14 June 1937 (age 89) Hobart, Tasmania, Australia
- Party: Labor Party
- Education: University of Tasmania

Neil Leonard Charles Batt AO (born 14 June 1937), is a former Tasmanian government minister, deputy Premier and member of the Tasmanian House of Assembly. A member of the Labor Party, he was leader of the party in Tasmania, and Leader of the Opposition from 1986 to 1988.

== Early life and education ==
Batt was born in Hobart, and educated at Hobart High School and the University of Tasmania, from which he graduated with a Bachelor of Arts. He worked as a secondary school teacher from 1960 to 1961, and from 1964 to 1966.

== Political career ==
In 1966, Batt ran as the Labor candidate for Denison in the 1966 federal election, although he was unsuccessful, with the incumbent Liberal candidate, Adrian Gibson, retaining the seat.

Batt was elected to the Tasmanian House of Assembly on 10 May 1969 at the 1969 state election, representing Denison for the Labor Party. On 3 May 1972, Batt was appointed Chief Secretary and Minister for Transport in Eric Reece's cabinet. On 17 April 1974, he was made Minister for Education, with Recreation, the Arts and Federal Affairs being added to his portfolio in 1976.

When Doug Lowe became Premier of Tasmania on 1 December 1977, Batt was appointed Deputy Premier and Treasurer. He was re-elected for Denison at the 1979 state election, but the enforcement of a previously-ignored rule which capped campaign expenditure at $1,500 saw the election of three MHAs (Julian Amos, John Devine and John Green) declared invalid. As a result, a by-election was called for February 1980, and all Denison candidates were up for re-election, including Batt who stood down as Deputy Premier and Treasurer until the by-election was held. The ALP held a conference to endorse its candidates for the by-election, and the party's Left faction decided to produce a "how-to-vote" card, endorsing its preferred candidate John Green first, with Batt placed fourth. With the Left faction's perceived snub to Batt, the government sought to negate the effect of the how-to-vote ticket, and settled on the introduction of "Robson Rotation", a method of printing ballot papers in batches with candidates listed differently to combat the effect of the "donkey vote".

Batt resumed his role as Deputy Premier and Treasurer on 25 February, with responsibility for Finance and Forests. However, on 28 July, Batt announced his resignation from the House of Assembly and the Labor Party to take up a position with the United Nations in Bangladesh.

Upon the end of his UN posting, Batt worked in private industry, but returned to politics in 1986, when he was re-elected to the House of Assembly for Denison on at the state election on 8 February. On 19 February, he became leader of the Labor Party in Tasmania, serving as Leader of the Opposition until 14 December 1988. He retired from politics on 13 May 1989.

== Honours ==
In 1991, he was made an Officer of the Order of Australia for in recognition of service to the Tasmanian Parliament, to politics and to the community.

Political offices
Preceded by Doug Lowe	Deputy Premier of Tasmania; 1977–1979, 1980	Succeeded by Michael Barnard
Preceded by Ken Wriedt	Leader of the Opposition in Tasmania; 1986–1988	Succeeded by Michael Field
Party political offices
Preceded by Ken Wriedt	Leader of the Labor Party in Tasmania; 1986–1988	Succeeded by Michael Field
