= Bob Graham (Tasmanian politician) =

Australian politician

Robert James "Bob" Graham (born 13 May 1942) is a former Australian politician.

He was born in Burnie, Tasmania. He was first elected to the Tasmanian House of Assembly in 1980 as a Labor member for Denison, in a recount following Neil Batt's resignation. Defeated in 1982, he returned to the Assembly in 1984 in the recount resulting from John Devine's resignation. He was defeated again in 1986.
