= Stephen Salter (politician) =

Australian politician

Stephen Gordon Salter (1938 – 7 May 2006) was an Australian politician. In 1982, he was elected to the Tasmanian House of Assembly as a Liberal member for Wilmot. He served until his defeat in 1986.
