= Ray Bonney =

Australian politician

Raymond Claude Bonney OBE (10 March 1919 – 25 April 1994) was an Australian politician.

Bonney was born in Tasmania. In 1972, he was elected to the Tasmanian House of Assembly as a Liberal member for Braddon. He was Deputy Liberal Leader from 1977 to 1979. He retired in 1986.
