= Geoff Davis (Australian politician) =

Australian politician

Geoffrey Bertrand "Geoff" Davis (born 13 February 1931) is a former Australian politician. He was born in Hobart, Tasmania. At the 1982 state election, he was elected to the Tasmanian House of Assembly as a Liberal member for Denison. He served as a minister from 1984 to 1986, but resigned from parliament and from the Liberal Party in 1987 following a disagreement over the State Bank.
