= Norm Sanders =

Australian politician

Senator for Tasmania
- In office 1 July 1985 – 1 March 1990
- Succeeded by: Robert Bell

Personal details
- Born: 15 October 1932 (age 93) Cleveland, Ohio, US
- Party: Democrats

Norman Karl Sanders (born 15 October 1932) is an Australian former politician, representing the Australian Democrats in the Tasmanian House of Assembly from 1980 to 1982 and the Australian Senate from 1985 to 1990.

== Early life ==
While in Hobart, Sanders worked as a TV journalist on the ABC current-affairs program This Day Tonight. This was the prelude to his becoming heavily involved in Australia's nascent environmental movement, and to his directorship of the Tasmanian Wilderness Society. He published two books on environmental issues.

== Political career ==
Sanders was elected to the Tasmanian House of Assembly as the Member for Denison at a 1980 by-election. On 23 December 1982, he resigned from the Tasmanian Parliament. He claimed that the new government, led by the Liberals' Robin Gray, was becoming totalitarian in nature over the Franklin Dam issue and, in particular, over the way in which anti-dam protesters were being treated by the state's law enforcement sector.

He was a member of an Australian parliamentary delegation to the Soviet Union where he had talks with Andrei Gromyko about nuclear disarmament. The delegation then proceeded to Poland to meet with General Wojciech Jaruzelski. He also was on delegations to NATO, Finland, Norway, Uzbekistan, the European Parliament, France, Belgium, and China. He was re-elected at the 1987 election but resigned from the Senate on 1 March 1990 to contest a Senate position in the Australian Capital Territory at the 1990 federal election. He was unsuccessful.
