= Julian Amos =

Australian politician (born 1945)

Julian John Amos (born 1 October 1945, Melbourne) was a Labor Party politician in the Australian state of Tasmania during 1976-1986 and 1992–1996. He was a Government Minister with portfolios of Primary Industry, Energy and Forests during 1979–1982. He was first elected to the Hobart based seat of Denison in 1976. He was defeated at the 1986 election. He stood again, successfully, at the 1992 election but was defeated in 1996.

At the 1979 election, Amos was one of three candidates found to have exceeded their spending limits and the election was declared void. At the subsequent 1980 by-election he was re-elected.

Amos earned a PhD in botany from the University of Tasmania.

Amos has served on the board of Hydro Tasmania. He is Chairman of the Forest Industries Association of Tasmania, a position he has held since 2006.
