= John Devine (Australian rules footballer) =

Australian rules footballer (1940–2023)

John Devine OAM

Personal information
- Full name: John Herbert Devine
- Born: 22 June 1940; Colac, Victoria, Australia
- Died: 29 January 2023 (aged 82)
- Original team: Colac
- Height: 180 cm (5 ft 11 in)
- Weight: 80 kg (176 lb)

Playing career^{1}
Years	Club	Games (Goals)
1960–1966	Geelong	118 (6)

Coaching career
Years	Club	Games (W–L–D)
1967–71; 1974–75; 1981	North Hobart	172 (86–82–4)
1986–88	Geelong	66 (28–37–1)
- ^{1} Playing statistics correct to the end of 1966.

Career highlights
- Geelong premiership player; North Hobart premiership captain-coach 1967, 1969, 1974; Tasmanian State Premiership captain-coach 1969; Tasmanian Football Hall of Fame inducted 2005

John Herbert Devine OAM (22 June 1940 – 29 January 2023) was an Australian rules footballer who played with Geelong in the Victorian Football League (VFL) during the 1960s, and Tasmanian Football League (TFL) side North Hobart between 1967 and 1974.

== Australian rules football career ==
A defender, Devine was recruited to Geelong as a 20-year-old from Colac, and he made his debut for Geelong against Footscray in round 1 of the 1960 VFL season. Devine would quickly become an integral part of a rising Geelong team. On 6 July 1963, he was a member of the Geelong team that were comprehensively and unexpectedly beaten by Fitzroy, 9.13 (67) to 3.13 (31) in the 1963 Miracle Match.

Given the nickname "Colac" by his teammates, in 1963 Devine was a member of Geelong's premiership team playing off the half-back flank where he was named amongst the best for Geelong. Devine would earn a reputation as a 'big-game player', consistently named amongst Geelong's best players in multiple finals matches.

Devine would play 118 games for Geelong, was vice-captain from 1961 to 1966, and was runner-up in the Carji Greeves Medal in 1960 and 1965. He also represented Victoria. Devine's last game for Geelong was during the finals of the 1966 VFL season, where he would be suspended for striking David Shaw.

In 1967 while still under suspension from the 1966 VFL season, he coached Tasmanian Football League side North Hobart over the boundary fence until his six-week suspension was finished. Devine went on that year to lead his very young team from last place in 1966 to a TFL premiership. He was best on ground in the 1967 Tasmanian State Premiership Final in which North Hobart took part, and (now playing as a forward) kicked five goals; the game is part of Australian rules folklore because the supporters of opposing team, Wynyard, tore down the goal posts before North Hobart's Dickie Collins could take his kick from point-blank range from a mark just before the siren.

Devine captain-coached two more TFL premierships in 1969 and 1974, and he also helped his team take out the Tasmanian State Premiership in 1969 following wins over NWFU premiers Latrobe, led and coached by Darrel Baldock, and NTFA premiers Launceston coached by Bob Withers. The State Premiership final against Launceston at York Park saw Devine's North Hobart win by a record 20 goals. He was nicknamed "Dead Legs" due to his loping running style, which belied his speed and hard-at-the-ball playing style. He returned to coach North Hobart in 1981, which by then was a struggling outfit, and returned a disappointing one win for the season in taking out the wooden spoon before retiring.

Devine returned to Geelong in an official capacity in 1986, when he became Geelong's coach after the departure of Tom Hafey. During his tenure, Devine recruited many players such as future Geelong Team of the Century ruck-rover Garry Hocking, future captain Mark Bairstow, Billy Brownless, Bruce Lindner, Gavin Exell, Barry Stoneham and David Cameron. All players would play a role in the team reaching the VFL Grand Final in 1989, with only Exell missing out due to injury.

At the end of the 1988 VFL season when Geelong finished 10th, Devine was not retained as coach. Devine was awarded life membership of the Geelong Football Club in 1993 and was inducted into the club's hall of fame in 2002.

In 2014, Devine was inducted as a legend into the Tasmanian Football Hall of Fame.

He was posthumously awarded the Medal of the Order of Australia in the 2024 King's Birthday Honours "service to Australian rules football, and to the community of Tasmania".

== Political career ==
Devine was a Labor Party member of the Tasmanian House of Assembly from 1979 to 1984 in the Denison electorate.

== Personal life and death ==
Devine died on 29 January 2023, at the age of 82.

== See also ==
- 1963 Miracle Match

== Bibliography ==
Holmesby, Russell; Main, Jim: The Encyclopedia of AFL Footballers: every AFL/VFL player since 1897.
