= Results of the 1992 Tasmanian state election =

Tasmanian state election, 1 February 1992 House of Assembly << 1989–1996 >>
Enrolled voters	314,579				
Votes cast	298,779		Turnout	94.97	+1.90
Informal votes	13,557		Informal	4.54	–0.81
Summary of votes by party
Party	Primary votes	%	Swing	Seats	Change
Liberal	154,337	54.11	+7.19	19	+ 2
Labor	82,296	28.85	–5.86	11	– 2
Ind. Green	37,742	13.23	–3.90	5	± 0
Advance Tasmania	7,263	2.55	+2.55	0	± 0
More Jobs	356	0.12	+0.12	0	± 0
Independent	3,228	1.13	+0.79	0	± 0
Total	285,222			35	

This is a list of House of Assembly results for the 1992 Tasmanian election.

== Results by division ==
=== Bass ===
1992 Tasmanian state election: Bass
Party	Candidate	Votes	%	±%
Quota		6,939		
Liberal	Frank Madill (elected 1)	17,154	30.9	+13.9
Liberal	John Beswick (elected 2)	5,638	10.2	+1.8
Liberal	David Fry	2,077	3.7	+2.7
Liberal	Tony Benneworth (elected 4)	1,819	3.3	+3.3
Liberal	Sue Napier (elected 7)	1,710	3.1	+3.1
Liberal	Rod Beaumont	1,477	2.7	+2.7
Liberal	Brian Mantach	1,462	2.6	+2.6
Labor	Gill James (elected 3)	5,109	9.2	+3.6
Labor	Peter Patmore (elected 5)	3,264	5.9	−3.1
Labor	Jim Cox	2,088	3.8	−2.3
Labor	Harry Holgate	2,010	3.6	−3.2
Labor	Terry Field	1,892	3.4	+3.4
Labor	Peter Daniel	1,146	2.1	+2.1
Labor	Charles Barnard	703	1.3	+1.3
Labor	Max Brown	194	0.4	+0.4
Independent Greens	Lance Armstrong (elected 6)	4,591	8.3	−3.8
Independent Greens	Ross Barwick	497	0.9	+0.9
Independent Greens	John Chester	357	0.6	+0.6
Independent Greens	Kristina Hesketh	233	0.4	+0.4
Independent Greens	Kay Thompson	226	0.4	+0.4
Independent Greens	Marion Fry	223	0.4	+0.4
Independent Greens	Nye Evans	206	0.4	+0.4
Advance Tasmania	Robin McKendrick	714	1.3	+1.3
Advance Tasmania	Eric Petrusma	310	0.6	+0.6
Independent	Tony Le Fevre	407	0.7	+0.7
Total formal votes		55,507	94.6	+0.7
Informal votes		3,148	5.4	−0.7
Turnout		58,655	95.4	+2.6
Party total votes
Liberal		31,337	56.5	+9.2
Labor		16,406	29.6	−7.8
Independent Greens		6,333	11.4	−2.7
Advance Tasmania		1,024	1.8	+1.8
Independent	Tony Le Fevre	407	0.7	+0.7

=== Braddon ===
1992 Tasmanian state election: Braddon
Party	Candidate	Votes	%	±%
Quota		7,129		
Liberal	Roger Groom (elected 1)	12,886	22.6	+4.5
Liberal	Tony Rundle (elected 2)	7,102	12.5	0.0
Liberal	Bill Bonde (elected 4)	6,286	11.0	−1.2
Liberal	Ron Cornish (elected 3)	5,787	10.1	+0.1
Liberal	Carole Cains (elected 6)	2,731	4.8	+1.6
Liberal	Gerald Heathcote	1,571	2.8	+2.8
Liberal	Tony Van Rooyen	1,105	1.9	+1.9
Labor	Michael Field (elected 5)	7,128	12.5	−3.1
Labor	Michael Weldon	1,573	2.8	−2.7
Labor	Sid Sidebottom	1,095	1.9	+1.9
Labor	Greg Richardson	1,077	1.9	+1.9
Labor	Jim Altimira	520	0.9	+0.9
Labor	Neil McConnell	260	0.5	+0.5
Labor	Colin Berry	213	0.4	+0.4
Independent Greens	Di Hollister (elected 7)	4,314	7.6	−2.8
Independent Greens	Jon Paice	181	0.3	+0.3
Independent Greens	George Sanders	144	0.3	+0.3
Independent Greens	Nicki Fletcher	136	0.2	+0.2
Independent Greens	Peter Walford	101	0.2	−0.4
Independent Greens	Richard Donaghey	71	0.1	+0.1
Independent Greens	Ian Clare	66	0.1	+0.1
Advance Tasmania	Gordon Ibbott	706	1.2	+1.2
Advance Tasmania	Ken Last	631	1.1	+1.1
Independent	Wayne Smith	986	1.7	+1.7
Independent	Peter Rettke	242	0.4	+0.4
Independent	Guy Coughlan	113	0.2	+0.2
Total formal votes		57,025	95.9	+1.1
Informal votes		2,425	4.1	−1.1
Turnout		59,450	95.7	+2.1
Party total votes
Liberal		37,468	65.7	+8.2
Labor		11,866	20.8	−9.1
Independent Greens		5,013	8.8	−2.7
Advance Tasmania		1,337	2.3	+2.3
Independent	Wayne Smith	986	1.7	+1.7
Independent	Peter Rettke	242	0.4	+0.4
Independent	Guy Coughlan	113	0.2	+0.2

=== Denison ===
1992 Tasmanian state election: Denison
Party	Candidate	Votes	%	±%
Quota		6,839		
Liberal	Ray Groom (elected 1)	14,654	26.8	+8.8
Liberal	Michael Hodgman (elected 3)	6,654	12.2	+12.2
Liberal	John Barker (elected 5)	858	1.6	−1.1
Liberal	Joy Cairns	822	1.5	+1.5
Liberal	Peter Dobromilsky	377	0.7	+0.7
Liberal	Ingrid Wren	346	0.6	+0.6
Liberal	Chris Gibson	332	0.6	−0.3
Labor	Judy Jackson (elected 4)	5,310	9.7	+2.4
Labor	John White (elected 6)	4,648	8.5	+0.3
Labor	David Crean	3,176	5.8	−1.8
Labor	Julian Amos (elected 7)	3,142	5.7	+5.7
Labor	Charles Touber	1,030	1.9	−0.8
Labor	Andrew Daniels	640	1.2	−1.3
Labor	Rosalind Escott	267	0.5	+0.5
Independent Greens	Bob Brown (elected 2)	8,255	15.1	−6.6
Independent Greens	Peg Putt	958	1.8	+1.8
Independent Greens	Rob Valentine	210	0.4	+0.4
Independent Greens	Karen Weldrick	137	0.3	+0.3
Independent Greens	Mary Jenkins	101	0.2	+0.2
Independent Greens	Stuart Baird	89	0.2	+0.2
Independent Greens	Dave Heatley	66	0.1	+0.1
Advance Tasmania	Hank Petrusma	1,928	3.5	+3.5
Advance Tasmania	Ruth Butler	90	0.2	+0.2
More Jobs	Brian Sampson	201	0.4	+0.4
More Jobs	Gordon Dunsby	155	0.3	+0.3
Independent	Ken Harvey	111	0.2	+0.2
Independent	Mary Guy	104	0.2	+0.2
Independent	Doug Fenton	46	0.1	+0.1
Total formal votes		54,707	95.6	+0.4
Informal votes		2,508	4.4	−0.4
Turnout		57,215	93.5	+2.1
Party total votes
Liberal		24,043	43.9	+5.5
Labor		18,213	33.3	−3.6
Independent Greens		9,816	17.9	−5.6
Advance Tasmania		2,018	3.7	+3.7
More Jobs		356	0.7	+0.7
Independent	Ken Harvey	111	0.2	+0.2
Independent	Mary Guy	104	0.2	+0.2
Independent	Doug Fenton	46	0.1	+0.1

=== Franklin ===
1992 Tasmanian state election: Franklin
Party	Candidate	Votes	%	±%
Quota		7,387		
Liberal	Peter Hodgman (elected 1)	13,987	23.7	+5.5
Liberal	John Cleary (elected 2)	5,902	10.0	−3.4
Liberal	Nigel Grace	1,801	3.0	+3.0
Liberal	Brian Davison (elected 6)	1,745	3.0	+1.4
Liberal	Claude Conlan	1,684	2.8	+2.8
Liberal	Jane Shoobridge	1,503	2.5	+2.5
Liberal	Tony Shanny	739	1.3	+1.3
Labor	Fran Bladel (elected 4)	6,580	11.1	+3.8
Labor	Michael Aird (elected 5)	6,218	10.5	+2.9
Labor	Paul Lennon (elected 7)	3,907	6.6	−1.1
Labor	John Sheppard	1,030	1.7	+1.7
Labor	David Traynor	835	1.4	+1.4
Labor	Darren Purcell	828	1.4	+1.4
Labor	Andrew MacLeod	548	0.9	+0.9
Independent Greens	Gerry Bates (elected 3)	7,042	11.9	−6.3
Independent Greens	Mike Foley	1,261	2.1	+2.1
Independent Greens	Penny King	295	0.5	+0.5
Independent Greens	Lorraine Wiltshire	253	0.4	+0.4
Independent Greens	Eva Ruzicka	216	0.4	+0.4
Independent Greens	Charles Ellis	154	0.3	+0.3
Independent Greens	Eilean Robinson	130	0.2	+0.2
Advance Tasmania	Clive Attwater	816	1.4	+1.4
Advance Tasmania	Philip French	696	1.2	+1.2
Advance Tasmania	Harry Grimsey	176	0.3	+0.3
Independent	Nigel Abbott	412	0.7	+0.7
Independent	Chris Munday	158	0.3	+0.3
Independent	Malcolm Muir	72	0.1	+0.1
Independent	Jane Flach	61	0.1	+0.1
Independent	Grant Goodwin	41	0.1	+0.1
Total formal votes		59,090	95.8	+0.7
Informal votes		2,565	4.2	−0.7
Turnout		61,655	95.0	+1.4
Party total votes
Liberal		27,361	46.3	+6.2
Labor		19,946	33.8	−4.5
Independent Greens		9,351	15.8	−3.9
Advance Tasmania		1,688	2.9	+2.9
Independent	Nigel Abbott	412	0.7	+0.7
Independent	Chris Munday	158	0.3	+0.3
Independent	Malcolm Muir	72	0.1	+0.1
Independent	Jane Flach	61	0.1	+0.1
Independent	Grant Goodwin	41	0.1	+0.1

=== Lyons ===
1992 Tasmanian state election: Lyons
Party	Candidate	Votes	%	±%
Quota		7,362		
Liberal	Robin Gray (elected 1)	18,751	31.8	−3.9
Liberal	Ian Braid (elected 2)	4,096	7.0	+3.7
Liberal	Bob Mainwaring (elected 7)	2,872	4.9	+2.3
Liberal	Graeme Page (elected 6)	2,386	4.0	+1.7
Liberal	Malcolm Cleland	2,369	4.0	+4.0
Liberal	Denise Swan	2,171	3.7	+3.7
Liberal	The Duke of Avram	1,483	2.5	−0.9
Labor	Michael Polley (elected 5)	6,123	10.4	−0.3
Labor	David Llewellyn (elected 4)	5,943	10.1	+3.1
Labor	Chris Batt	1,421	2.4	−1.7
Labor	Peter Gilmore	684	1.2	+1.2
Labor	Pat Tate	633	1.1	+1.1
Labor	Eugene Alexander	631	1.1	+1.1
Labor	Brian Smith	430	0.7	+0.7
Independent Greens	Christine Milne (elected 3)	6,025	10.2	−6.0
Independent Greens	Diane Masters	501	0.9	+0.5
Independent Greens	Noel Harper	221	0.4	+0.4
Independent Greens	Laurie Goldsworthy	180	0.3	0.0
Independent Greens	Tess Schramm	111	0.2	+0.2
Independent Greens	Jeremy Pearce	107	0.2	+0.2
Independent Greens	Phil Forward	84	0.1	+0.1
Advance Tasmania	Dudley Parker	500	0.8	+0.8
Advance Tasmania	Simon Edmunds	349	0.6	+0.6
Advance Tasmania	Bill Chugg	195	0.3	+0.3
Advance Tasmania	Les Whittle	152	0.3	+0.3
Independent	Ian Jamieson	299	0.5	+0.5
Independent	John Davidson	176	0.3	+0.3
Total formal votes		58,893	95.3	+1.0
Informal votes		2,911	4.7	−1.0
Turnout		61,804	95.2	+1.3
Party total votes
Liberal		34,128	57.9	+6.5
Labor		15,865	26.9	−4.1
Independent Greens		7,229	12.3	−4.5
Advance Tasmania		1,196	2.0	+2.0
Independent	Ian Jamieson	299	0.5	+0.5
Independent	John Davidson	176	0.3	+0.3

== See also ==
- 1992 Tasmanian state election
- Candidates of the 1992 Tasmanian state election
- Members of the Tasmanian House of Assembly, 1992-1996
