= Results of the 1996 Tasmanian state election =

Tasmanian state election, 24 February 1996 House of Assembly << 1992–1998 >>
Enrolled voters	324,556				
Votes cast	311,486		Turnout	95.98	+1.00
Informal votes	16,815		Informal	5.40	+0.84
Summary of votes by party
Party	Primary votes	%	Swing	Seats	Change
Liberal	121,391	41.20	–12.91	16	– 3
Labor	119,260	40.47	+11.62	14	+ 3
Greens	32,813	11.14	–2.09	4	– 1
National	6,476	2.20	+2.20	0	± 0
Extremely Greedy 40 Extra	2,251	0.76	+0.76	0	± 0
Democrats	2,190	0.74	+0.74	0	± 0
Independent	10,290	3.49	+2.36	1	+ 1
Others			–2.67	0	± 0
Total	294,671			35	

This is a list of House of Assembly results for the 1996 Tasmanian election.

== Results by division ==
=== Bass ===
1996 Tasmanian state election: Bass
Party	Candidate	Votes	%	±%
Quota		7,348		
Liberal	Frank Madill (elected 1)	8,431	14.3	−16.6
Liberal	Sue Napier (elected 2)	6,244	10.6	+7.5
Liberal	John Beswick (elected 4)	4,684	8.0	−2.2
Liberal	Tony Benneworth (elected 7)	3,608	6.1	+2.8
Liberal	David Fry	3,055	5.2	+1.5
Liberal	Peter Smith	1,398	2.4	+2.4
Liberal	Bob Andrew	591	1.0	+1.0
Labor	Peter Patmore (elected 3)	6,004	10.2	+4.3
Labor	Gill James (elected 5)	4,918	8.4	−0.8
Labor	Jim Cox (elected 6)	3,305	5.6	+1.8
Labor	Dee Potter	2,374	4.0	+4.0
Labor	Helen Polley	2,186	3.7	+3.7
Labor	Peter Daniel	1,904	3.2	+1.1
Labor	Lynda Jones	1,648	2.8	+2.8
Labor	Alan Stacey	525	0.9	+0.9
Greens	Lance Armstrong	4,413	7.5	−0.8
Greens	Louise Fairfax	417	0.7	+0.7
Greens	Elizabeth Smith	336	0.6	+0.6
Greens	Daisy Cameron	253	0.4	+0.4
Greens	David James	218	0.4	+0.4
Greens	Rodney O'Keefe	215	0.4	+0.4
Greens	David Obendorf	213	0.4	+0.4
National	Brian Boulton	476	0.8	+0.8
National	Barry Jefferies	417	0.7	+0.7
Independent	Ron Rice	507	0.9	+0.9
Extremely Greedy 40%	Peter Heading	243	0.4	+0.4
Extremely Greedy 40%	Erik Barratt-Peacock	199	0.3	+0.3
Total formal votes		58,782	94.3	−0.3
Informal votes		3,555	5.7	+0.3
Turnout		62,337	95.7	+0.3
Party total votes
Liberal		28,011	47.7	−8.8
Labor		22,864	38.9	+9.3
Greens		6,065	10.3	−1.1
National		893	1.5	+1.5
Independent	Ron Rice	507	0.9	+0.9
Extremely Greedy 40%		442	0.8	+0.8

=== Braddon ===
1996 Tasmanian state election: Braddon
Party	Candidate	Votes	%	±%
Quota		7,100		
Liberal	Bill Bonde (elected 2)	7,379	13.0	+2.0
Liberal	Roger Groom (elected 3)	6,298	11.1	−11.5
Liberal	Tony Rundle (elected 4)	5,562	9.8	−2.7
Liberal	Ron Cornish (elected 5)	4,131	7.3	−2.8
Liberal	Carole Cains	3,505	6.2	+1.4
Liberal	Ray Baldock	734	1.3	+1.3
Liberal	Michael Wickham	570	1.0	+1.0
Labor	Michael Field (elected 1)	7,955	14.0	+1.5
Labor	Bryan Green	2,588	4.6	+4.6
Labor	Brenton Best (elected 6)	2,493	4.4	+4.4
Labor	Yvonne Bird	1,698	3.0	+3.0
Labor	Greg Richardson	1,532	2.7	+0.8
Labor	Mike Gard	1,477	2.6	+2.6
Labor	Jim Altimira	1,262	2.2	+1.3
Labor	Sally Schnackenberg	508	0.9	+0.9
Greens	Di Hollister (elected 7)	4,561	8.0	+0.4
Greens	Paul O'Halloran	146	0.3	+0.3
Greens	Faye Dixon	129	0.2	+0.2
Greens	Jon Paice	108	0.2	−0.1
Greens	Eddie Storace	101	0.2	+0.2
Greens	Jo Kelly	94	0.2	+0.2
Greens	John Wilson	55	0.1	+0.1
National	Virginia Holmes	910	1.6	+1.6
National	Steve Stevenson	459	0.8	+0.8
National	Grant Goodwin	424	0.7	+0.7
National	Geoff Leslie	411	0.7	+0.7
National	George Lee	205	0.4	+0.4
National	Henry Eiler	86	0.2	+0.2
Group B	David Bissett	644	1.1	+1.1
Group B	Laurie Heathorn	83	0.1	+0.1
Independent	Andrew Vanderfeen	395	0.7	+0.7
Extremely Greedy 40%	Martin Duffy	128	0.2	+0.2
Extremely Greedy 40%	Patrick Carnuccio	103	0.2	+0.2
Independent	John Mackenzie	58	0.1	+0.1
Total formal votes		56,792	94.4	−1.5
Informal votes		3,380	5.6	+1.5
Turnout		60,172	96.5	+0.8
Party total votes
Liberal		28,179	49.6	−16.1
Labor		19,513	34.4	+13.6
Greens		5,194	9.1	+0.3
National		2,495	4.4	+4.4
Group B		727	1.3	+1.3
Independent	Andrew Vanderfeen	395	0.7	+0.7
Extremely Greedy 40%		231	0.4	+0.4
Independent	John Mackenzie	58	0.1	+0.1

=== Denison ===
1996 Tasmanian state election: Denison
Party	Candidate	Votes	%	±%
Quota		7,453		
Labor	Jim Bacon (elected 2)	8,766	14.7	+14.7
Labor	John White (elected 3)	6,809	11.4	+2.9
Labor	Judy Jackson (elected 6)	3,858	6.5	−3.2
Labor	Julian Amos	3,721	6.2	+0.5
Labor	Cora Trevarthen	1,541	2.6	+2.6
Labor	Stuart Slade	1,038	1.7	+1.7
Labor	Pam Wright	888	1.5	+1.5
Labor	Bob Riep	424	0.7	+0.7
Liberal	Ray Groom (elected 1)	9,637	16.2	−10.6
Liberal	Michael Hodgman (elected 7)	3,994	6.7	−5.5
Liberal	Bob Cheek (elected 5)	3,946	6.6	+6.6
Liberal	Jane Goodluck	1,922	3.2	+3.2
Liberal	John Barker	998	1.7	+0.1
Liberal	Nell Ames	429	0.7	+0.7
Liberal	Hans Willink	207	0.3	+0.3
Greens	Peg Putt (elected 4)	5,738	9.6	+7.8
Greens	Dick Friend	1,211	2.0	+2.0
Greens	Ann Wessing	308	0.5	+0.5
Greens	Kath Hughes	299	0.5	+0.5
Greens	Trish Moran	277	0.5	+0.5
Greens	Peter Jones	272	0.5	+0.5
Greens	Margie Law	258	0.4	+0.4
National	Kevin Pelham	462	0.8	+0.8
National	Ian Coggins	292	0.5	+0.5
Extremely Greedy 40%	Chris Kelly	435	0.7	+0.7
Extremely Greedy 40%	Jenny Sheridan	267	0.4	+0.4
Independent	Austra Maddox	698	1.2	+1.2
Group F	Jeff Briscoe	551	0.9	+0.9
Group F	Sharon Howett	35	0.1	+0.1
Group D	Informal	285	0.5	+0.5
Group D	Janet Locke	52	0.1	+0.1
Total formal votes		59,618	94.8	+0.8
Informal votes		3,240	5.2	−0.8
Turnout		62,858	95.2	+1.7
Party total votes
Labor		27,045	45.4	+12.1
Liberal		21,333	35.4	−8.5
Greens		8,363	14.0	−3.9
National		754	1.3	+1.3
Extremely Greedy 40%		702	1.2	+1.2
Independent	Austra Maddox	698	1.2	+1.2
Group F		586	1.0	+1.0
Group D		337	0.6	+0.6

=== Franklin ===
1996 Tasmanian state election: Franklin
Party	Candidate	Votes	%	±%
Quota		7,320		
Labor	Fran Bladel (elected 1)	7,933	13.5	+2.4
Labor	Paul Lennon (elected 2)	6,504	11.1	+4.5
Labor	Paula Wriedt (elected 7)	3,273	5.6	+5.6
Labor	John Sheppard	2,566	4.4	+2.7
Labor	Lin Thorp	1,548	2.6	+2.6
Labor	Eugene Alexander	1,284	2.2	+2.2
Labor	Greg Cooper	1,276	2.2	+2.2
Labor	Simon Boughey	602	1.0	+1.0
Liberal	Peter Hodgman (elected 3)	6,102	10.4	−13.3
Liberal	John Cleary (elected 4)	4,097	7.0	−3.0
Liberal	Paul Harriss	3,040	5.2	+5.2
Liberal	Bob Gozzi	2,150	3.7	+3.7
Liberal	Martin McManus	1,996	3.4	+3.4
Liberal	Brian Davison	795	1.4	−1.6
Liberal	Edyth Langham	546	0.9	+0.9
Greens	Mike Foley (elected 5)	3,515	6.0	+3.9
Greens	Louise Crossley	1,173	2.0	+2.0
Greens	Penny King	470	0.8	+0.8
Greens	Kay Carolin-McFarlane	313	0.5	+0.5
Greens	Marie Giblin	279	0.5	+0.5
Greens	Julian Bush	277	0.5	+0.5
Greens	Adam Bowden	223	0.4	+0.4
Group C	Bruce Goodluck (elected 6)	3,671	6.3	+6.3
Group C	Catherine Goodluck	639	1.1	+1.1
Democrats	Richard James	1,501	2.6	+2.6
Democrats	Liz Burton	323	0.6	+0.6
Democrats	Leonie Godridge	212	0.4	+0.4
Democrats	Rob Farrington	154	0.3	+0.3
Independent	John Devereux	862	1.5	+1.5
Extremely Greedy 40%	Tracey Newman	250	0.4	+0.4
Extremely Greedy 40%	Robert Cowburn	227	0.4	+0.4
National	Bill Darling	242	0.4	+0.4
National	Pat Rogers	189	0.3	+0.3
Independent	Chester Somerville	322	0.5	+0.5
Total formal votes		58,554	94.8	−1.0
Informal votes		3,182	5.2	+1.0
Turnout		61,736	96.2	+1.2
Party total votes
Labor		24,986	42.7	+8.9
Liberal		18,726	32.0	−14.3
Greens		6,250	10.7	−5.1
Group C		4,310	7.4	+7.4
Democrats		2,190	3.7	+3.7
Independent	John Devereux	862	1.5	+1.5
Extremely Greedy 40%		477	0.8	+0.8
National		431	0.7	+0.7
Independent	Chester Somerville	322	0.5	+0.5

=== Lyons ===
1996 Tasmanian state election: Lyons
Party	Candidate	Votes	%	±%
Quota		7,616		
Liberal	Bob Mainwaring (elected 3)	5,335	8.8	+3.9
Liberal	Denise Swan (elected 7)	4,926	8.1	+4.4
Liberal	Rene Hidding (elected 6)	4,626	7.6	+7.6
Liberal	Graeme Page	4,572	7.5	+3.4
Liberal	Malcolm Cleland	2,405	3.9	−0.1
Liberal	His Grace the Most Noble Duke of Avram	1,863	3.1	+0.6
Liberal	Stephen Salter	1,615	2.7	+2.7
Labor	David Llewellyn (elected 1)	9,817	16.1	+6.0
Labor	Michael Polley (elected 2)	7,981	13.1	+2.7
Labor	Lara Giddings (elected 4)	2,162	3.5	+3.5
Labor	Dudley Parker	1,468	2.4	+2.4
Labor	Pat Tate	1,249	2.1	+1.0
Labor	Andrew MacGregor	1,248	2.0	+2.0
Labor	Martin Clifford	927	1.5	+1.5
Greens	Christine Milne (elected 5)	5,917	9.7	−0.5
Greens	Annie Willock	207	0.3	+0.3
Greens	Deborah Lynch	195	0.3	+0.3
Greens	Glenn Millar	171	0.3	+0.3
Greens	Laurie Goldsworthy	168	0.3	0.0
Greens	Stuart Lennox	152	0.2	+0.2
Greens	Kim Imber	131	0.2	+0.2
National	Peter Murray	806	1.3	+1.3
National	David Tomkinson	357	0.6	+0.6
National	Paul Pinder	222	0.4	+0.4
National	Rick Wright	204	0.3	+0.3
National	Julia Gulson	177	0.3	+0.3
National	Christopher Parry	137	0.2	+0.2
Group C	Max Burr	927	1.5	+1.5
Group C	Paul Ashley	45	0.1	+0.1
Independent	Darryl Gerrity	516	0.8	+0.8
Extremely Greedy 40%	Annie Beecroft	214	0.4	+0.4
Extremely Greedy 40%	Andrea Long	185	0.3	+0.3
Total formal votes		60,925	94.6	−0.7
Informal votes		3,458	5.4	+0.7
Turnout		64,383	96.3	+1.1
Party total votes
Liberal		25,342	41.6	−16.3
Labor		24,852	40.8	+13.9
Greens		6,941	11.4	−0.9
National		1,903	3.1	+3.1
Group C		972	1.6	+1.6
Independent	Darryl Gerrity	516	0.8	+0.8
Extremely Greedy 40%		399	0.7	+0.7

== See also ==
- 1996 Tasmanian state election
- Candidates of the 1996 Tasmanian state election
- Members of the Tasmanian House of Assembly, 1996-1998
