= Electoral results for the Division of Lyons (state, 1972-present) =

This is a list of electoral results for the division of Lyons in Tasmanian elections since 1972.

== Election results ==
=== Elections in the 2020s ===
==== 2025 ====

2025 Tasmanian state election: Lyons
Party	Candidate	Votes	%	±%
Quota		9,257		
Liberal	Guy Barnett (elected 1)	9,975	13.3	+2.2
Liberal	Jane Howlett (elected 2)	9,346	12.5	+3.3
Liberal	Mark Shelton (elected 6)	4,698	6.3	−0.7
Liberal	Stephanie Cameron	2,793	3.7	−0.2
Liberal	Richard Hallett	2,129	2.8	+0.3
Liberal	Poppy Lyne	1,544	2.1	+2.1
Liberal	Bree Groves	996	1.3	+1.3
Labor	Jen Butler (elected 4)	6,445	8.6	+5.4
Labor	Brian Mitchell (elected 5)	5,400	7.2	+7.2
Labor	Richard Goss	2,674	3.6	+1.2
Labor	Casey Farrell	2,640	3.5	+1.9
Labor	Sharon Campbell	1,732	2.3	+2.3
Labor	Edwin Batt	1,428	1.9	+0.5
Labor	Saxon O'Donnell	990	1.3	+1.3
Greens	Tabatha Badger (elected 3)	5,507	7.3	+1.8
Greens	Hannah Rubenach-Quinn	1,053	1.4	−0.1
Greens	Alistair Allan	932	1.2	+0.4
Greens	Isabel Shapcott	813	1.1	+1.1
Greens	Craig Brown	776	1.0	+0.0
Greens	Mitch Houghton	563	0.8	+0.1
Greens	Joey Cavanagh	514	0.7	+0.7
Shooters, Fishers, Farmers	Carlo Di Falco (elected 7)	5,050	6.7	+5.9
National	John Tucker	1,608	2.1	−1.0
National	Andrew Jenner	833	1.1	−1.8
National	Lesley Pyecroft	273	0.4	−2.1
National	Rick Mandelson	1,841	0.4	+0.4
National	Francis Haddon-Cave	200	0.3	+0.3
Independent	Angela Offord	941	1.3	+1.0
Independent	Michelle Dracoulis	845	1.1	+1.1
Independent	Jiri Lev	498	0.7	+0.7
Independent	John Hawkins	475	0.6	+0.6
Independent	Phillip Bigg	364	0.5	−0.5
Independent	Ray Broomhall	256	0.3	+0.3
Independent	Tenille Murtagh	193	0.3	+0.3
Independent	Paul Dare	189	0.3	+0.3
Total formal votes		74,936	63.4	+1.0
Informal votes		5,293	6.6	−1.0
Turnout		80,229	89.7	−1.3
Party total votes
Liberal		31,481	42.0	+4.4
Labor		21,309	28.4	-4.3
Greens		10,158	13.6	+2.7
Shooters, Fishers, Farmers		5,050	6.7	+2.0
National		3,177	4.2	+4.2
Independent	Angela Offord	941	1.3	+1.0
Independent	Michelle Dracoulis	845	1.1	+1.1
Independent	Jiri Lev	498	0.7	+0.7
Independent	John Hawkins	475	0.6	+0.6
Independent	Phillip Bigg	364	0.5	−0.5
Independent	Ray Broomhall	256	0.3	+0.3
Independent	Tenille Murtagh	193	0.3	+0.3
Independent	Paul Dare	189	0.3	+0.3
Shooters, Fishers and Farmers gain from Lambie Network				

==== 2024 ====
2024 Tasmanian state election: Lyons
Party	Candidate	Votes	%	±%
Quota		9,257		
Liberal	Guy Barnett (elected 2)	8,252	11.1	−9.7
Liberal	Jane Howlett (elected 3)	6,843	9.2	+9.2
Liberal	Mark Shelton (elected 5)	5,184	7.0	−5.1
Liberal	Stephanie Cameron	2,865	3.9	−0.6
Liberal	Richard Hallett	1,867	2.5	+2.5
Liberal	Justin Derksen	1,483	2.0	+2.0
Liberal	Gregory Brown	1,353	1.8	+1.8
Labor	Rebecca White (elected 1)	15,607	21.1	−1.9
Labor	Jen Butler (elected 4)	2,363	3.2	−0.5
Labor	Richard Goss	1,790	2.4	+2.4
Labor	Ben Dudman	1,491	2.0	+2.0
Labor	Casey Farrell	1,182	1.6	+1.6
Labor	Edwin Batt	1,063	1.4	−0.2
Labor	Carole McQueeney	780	1.1	+1.1
Greens	Tabatha Badger (elected 7)	4,044	5.5	+5.5
Greens	Hannah Rubenach-Quinn	1,117	1.5	+1.5
Greens	Craig Brown	741	1.0	+1.0
Greens	Alistair Allan	620	0.8	+0.8
Greens	Glenn Millar	520	0.7	−0.0
Greens	Mitch Houghton	516	0.7	+0.7
Greens	Gary Whisson	489	0.7	+0.7
Lambie	Andrew Jenner (elected 6)	2,177	2.9	+2.9
Lambie	Troy Pfitzner	2,127	2.9	+2.9
Lambie	Lesley Pyecroft	1,841	2.5	+2.5
Shooters, Fishers, Farmers	Ray Williams	953	1.3	+1.3
Shooters, Fishers, Farmers	Shane Broadby	755	1.0	+1.0
Shooters, Fishers, Farmers	Phillip Bigg	715	1.0	+1.0
Shooters, Fishers, Farmers	Carlo Di Falco	599	0.8	−3.7
Shooters, Fishers, Farmers	Wayne Turale	511	0.7	+0.7
Independent	John Tucker	2,309	3.1	−3.4
Animal Justice	Anna Megan Gralton	1,213	1.6	+1.6
Independent	Angela Offord	214	0.3	+0.3
Independent	Loueen (Lou) Triffitt	175	0.2	+0.2
Independent	Andrew Roberts	130	0.2	+0.2
Independent	Jenny Branch-Allen	92	0.1	+0.1
Independent	Fraser Miller	70	0.1	+0.1
Total formal votes		74,051	92.8	−1.2
Informal votes		5,769	7.2	+1.2
Turnout		79,820	91.0	−0.1
Party total votes
Liberal		27,847	37.6	−13.6
Labor		24,276	32.8	+0.2
Greens		8,047	10.9	+2.0
Lambie		6,145	8.3	+8.3
Shooters, Fishers, Farmers		3,533	4.8	+0.3
Independent	John Tucker	2,309	3.1	−3.4
Animal Justice		1,213	1.6	+1.6
Independent	Angela Offord	214	0.3	+0.3
Independent	Loueen (Lou) Triffitt	175	0.2	+0.2
Independent	Andrew Roberts	130	0.2	+0.2
Independent	Jenny Branch-Allen	92	0.1	+0.1
Independent	Fraser Miller	70	0.1	+0.1

==== 2021 ====
2021 Tasmanian state election: Lyons
Party	Candidate	Votes	%	±%
Quota		11,839		
Liberal	Guy Barnett (elected 2)	14,821	20.9	+7.2
Liberal	Mark Shelton (elected 3)	8,613	12.1	+0.0
Liberal	John Tucker (elected 5)	4,619	6.5	+1.6
Liberal	Stephanie Cameron	3,168	4.5	+4.5
Liberal	Justin Derksen	2,622	3.7	+3.7
Liberal	Susie Bower	2,517	3.5	+3.5
Labor	Rebecca White (elected 1)	16,338	23.0	−0.6
Labor	Jen Butler (elected 4)	2,635	3.7	+1.4
Labor	Janet Lambert	2,278	3.2	+0.6
Labor	Edwin Batt	1,141	1.6	+1.6
Labor	Gerard Gaffney	721	1.0	−0.1
Greens	Liz Johnstone	2,883	4.1	+4.1
Greens	Tim Morris	1,502	2.1	+2.1
Greens	Jill Pierce	737	1.0	+1.0
Greens	Isabel Shapcott	660	0.9	+0.9
Greens	Glenn Millar	511	0.7	0.0
Shooters, Fishers, Farmers	Carlo Di Falco	3,175	4.5	+4.5
Animal Justice	Sharon McLay	1,411	2.0	+2.0
Independent	George Lane	674	0.9	+0.9
Total formal votes		71,026	94.0	−0.3
Informal votes		4,539	6.0	+0.3
Turnout		75,565	91.1	−1.4
Party total votes
Liberal		36,360	51.2	+0.6
Labor		23,113	32.5	−0.4
Greens		6,293	8.9	+2.3
Shooters, Fishers, Farmers		3,175	4.5	+4.5
Animal Justice		1,411	2.0	+2.0
Independent	George Lane	674	0.9	+0.9
Liberal hold		Swing	+7.2	
Liberal hold		Swing	+0.0	
Liberal hold		Swing	+1.6	
Labor hold		Swing	–0.6	
Labor hold		Swing	+1.4	

=== Elections in the 2010s ===
==== 2018 ====
2018 Tasmanian state election: Lyons
Party	Candidate	Votes	%	±%
Quota		11,538		
Liberal	Guy Barnett (elected 2)	9,454	13.7	−1.0
Liberal	Rene Hidding (elected 4)	8,504	12.3	−4.4
Liberal	Mark Shelton (elected 3)	8,374	12.1	−0.0
Liberal	Jane Howlett	5,259	7.6	+7.6
Liberal	John Tucker	3,404	4.9	+4.9
Labor	Rebecca White (elected 1)	16,338	23.6	+10.7
Labor	Janet Lambert	1,783	2.6	+2.6
Labor	Jen Butler (elected 5)	1,616	2.3	+2.3
Labor	Darren Clark	1,401	2.0	+0.4
Labor	Kylie Wright	920	1.3	+1.3
Labor	Gerard Gaffney	752	1.1	+1.1
Greens	Fraser Brindley	1,905	2.8	+2.8
Greens	Lucy Landon-Lane	832	1.2	+1.2
Greens	Helen Hutchinson	818	1.2	+1.2
Greens	Glenn Millar	501	0.7	−0.0
Greens	Gary Whisson	463	0.7	+0.7
Lambie	Michael Kent	1,977	2.9	+2.9
Lambie	Chris Reynolds	1,044	1.5	+1.5
Lambie	Bob Vervaart	768	1.1	+1.1
Shooters, Fishers, Farmers	Shane Broadby	623	0.9	+0.9
Shooters, Fishers, Farmers	Andrew Harvey	621	0.9	+0.9
Shooters, Fishers, Farmers	Matthew Allen	596	0.9	+0.9
Shooters, Fishers, Farmers	Wayne Turale	535	0.8	+0.8
Shooters, Fishers, Farmers	Carlo Di Falco	423	0.6	+0.6
Independent	Kim Peart	158	0.2	+0.2
Independent	Tennille Murtagh	153	0.2	+0.2
Total formal votes		69,222	94.8	+0.3
Informal votes		3,791	5.5	−0.3
Turnout		73,013	92.1	−1.7
Party total votes
Liberal		34,995	50.6	−1.4
Labor		22,810	33.0	+5.3
Greens		4,519	6.5	−4.9
Lambie		3,484	5.0	+5.0
Shooters, Fishers, Farmers		2,333	3.4	+3.4
Independent	Kim Peart	158	0.2	+0.2
Independent	Tennille Murtagh	153	0.2	+0.2
Liberal hold		Swing	–1.0	
Liberal hold		Swing	–4.4	
Liberal hold		Swing	–0.0	
Labor hold		Swing	+10.7	
Labor hold		Swing	+2.3	

==== 2014 ====
2014 Tasmanian state election: Lyons
Party	Candidate	Votes	%	±%
Quota		11,060		
Liberal	Rene Hidding (elected 1)	11,097	16.7	+4.9
Liberal	Guy Barnett (elected 2)	9,741	14.7	+14.7
Liberal	Mark Shelton (elected 4)	8,060	12.1	+3.9
Liberal	Martyn Evans	3,005	4.5	+4.5
Liberal	Bertrand Cadart	2,560	3.9	+3.9
Labor	Rebecca White (elected 3)	8,589	12.9	+2.9
Labor	David Llewellyn (elected 5)	5,262	7.9	−2.4
Labor	Bob Gordon	2,724	4.1	+4.1
Labor	Darren Clark	1,080	1.6	+1.6
Labor	Jessey Dillon	719	1.1	+1.1
Greens	Tim Morris	5,140	7.7	−6.4
Greens	Hannah Rubenach	668	1.0	+1.0
Greens	Pip Brinklow	655	1.0	+1.0
Greens	Stephanie Taylor	604	0.9	+0.9
Greens	Glenn Millar	498	0.8	+0.8
Palmer United	Quentin Von Stieglitz	1,658	2.5	+2.5
Palmer United	Wayne Shoobridge	1,233	1.9	+1.9
Palmer United	Mark Grewar	867	1.3	+1.3
Independent	Paul Belcher	1,252	1.9	+1.9
National	Craig Davey	295	0.4	+0.4
National	Brett Hall	243	0.4	+0.4
National	Anne Salt	122	0.2	+0.2
National	Leo Perotti	89	0.1	+0.1
Independent	Murray Stewart	193	0.3	+0.3
Total formal votes		66,354	94.5	−0.5
Informal votes		3,828	5.5	+0.5
Turnout		70,182	93.8	+0.1
Party total votes
Liberal		34,463	51.9	+15.8
Labor		18,374	27.7	−15.1
Greens		7,565	11.4	−9.7
Palmer United		3,758	5.7	+5.7
Independent	Paul Belcher	1,252	1.9	+1.9
National		749	1.1	+1.1
Independent	Murray Stewart	193	0.3	+0.3
Liberal hold		Swing	+4.9	
Liberal hold		Swing	+14.7	
Liberal gain from Greens		Swing	+3.9	
Labor hold		Swing	+2.9	
Labor hold		Swing	–2.4	

==== 2010 ====
2010 Tasmanian state election: Lyons
Party	Candidate	Votes	%	±%
Quota		10,741		
Labor	Michael Polley (elected 4)	8,302	12.9	−8.3
Labor	David Llewellyn	6,612	10.3	−8.1
Labor	Rebecca White (elected 5)	6,453	10.0	+10.0
Labor	Heather Butler	2,540	3.9	−2.1
Labor	Nick Wright	2,357	3.7	+3.7
Labor	Brendan Sullivan	1,293	2.0	+2.0
Liberal	Rene Hidding (elected 2)	7,608	11.8	−2.3
Liberal	Mark Shelton (elected 3)	5,263	8.2	+8.2
Liberal	Jane Howlett	4,497	7.0	+2.5
Liberal	Jim Playsted	4,027	6.2	+6.2
Liberal	Leigh Gray	1,867	2.9	+2.9
Greens	Tim Morris (elected 1)	9,108	14.1	+3.6
Greens	Karen Cassidy	1,593	2.5	+1.0
Greens	Jackie Graham	1,039	1.6	+1.6
Greens	Karl Stevens	1,013	1.6	+1.6
Greens	Sharon Prior	871	1.4	+1.4
Total formal votes		64,443	95.0	−0.3
Informal votes		3,367	5.0	+0.3
Turnout		67,810	93.7	−1.4
Party total votes
Labor		27,557	42.8	−9.5
Liberal		23,262	36.1	+6.1
Greens		13,624	21.1	+5.8

=== Elections in the 2000s ===
==== 2006 ====
2006 Tasmanian state election: Lyons
Party	Candidate	Votes	%	±%
Quota		10,020		
Labor	Michael Polley (elected 1)	12,741	21.2	+5.9
Labor	David Llewellyn (elected 2)	11,036	18.4	−1.2
Labor	Heather Butler (elected 4)	3,612	6.0	+2.9
Labor	Kerry DeGrassi	2,361	3.9	+3.9
Labor	Malcolm Upston	1,451	2.4	+2.4
Liberal	Rene Hidding (elected 3)	8,455	14.1	+7.0
Liberal	Geoff Page	3,757	6.2	+6.2
Liberal	Jane Howlett	2,733	4.5	+4.5
Liberal	Richard Shoobridge	1,601	2.7	+2.7
Liberal	Andrew Wright	1,465	2.4	+2.4
Greens	Tim Morris (elected 5)	6,326	10.5	+1.4
Greens	Annie Willock	901	1.5	−0.9
Greens	Karen Cassidy	897	1.5	−0.8
Greens	Helen Gee	885	1.5	+1.5
Greens	Frederika Perey	500	0.8	+0.8
Tasmania First	Gordon Crawford	866	1.4	+1.4
Independent	Geoff Dickinson	354	0.6	+0.6
Independent	Geoff Wharton	178	0.3	+0.3
Total formal votes		60,119	95.3	+0.7
Informal votes		2,984	4.7	−0.7
Turnout		63,103	95.1	+1.3
Party total votes
Labor		31,201	51.9	−2.7
Liberal		18,011	29.9	+4.2
Greens		9,509	15.8	−1.3
Tasmania First		866	1.4	+1.4
Independent	Geoff Dickinson	354	0.6	+0.6
Independent	Geoff Wharton	178	0.3	+0.3

==== 2002 ====
2002 Tasmanian state election: Lyons
Party	Candidate	Votes	%	±%
Quota		9,385		
Labor	David Llewellyn (elected 1)	11,017	19.6	+6.1
Labor	Michael Polley (elected 2)	8,585	15.2	+2.6
Labor	Ken Bacon (elected 4)	8,073	14.3	+4.2
Labor	Heather Butler	1,745	3.1	+3.1
Labor	Craig Farrell	1,316	2.3	+2.3
Liberal	Rene Hidding (elected 5)	3,958	7.0	−4.1
Liberal	Denise Swan	3,905	6.9	−0.2
Liberal	Russell Anderson	3,520	6.3	+6.3
Liberal	Stephen Wilson	2,081	3.7	+3.7
Liberal	Ray Williams	1,019	1.8	+1.8
Greens	Tim Morris (elected 3)	5,150	9.1	+9.1
Greens	Annie Willock	1,335	2.4	+2.4
Greens	Karen Cassidy	1,284	2.3	+2.3
Greens	Lesley Nicklason	1,031	1.8	+1.8
Greens	Delia Thompson	859	1.5	+1.5
Group C	John Gee	427	0.8	+0.8
Group C	Dennis Woods	171	0.3	+0.3
Group C	Andy Oliver	133	0.2	+0.2
Independent	Caroline Larner	435	0.8	+0.8
Group E	Frank Strie	222	0.4	+0.4
Group E	Ray Norman	38	0.1	+0.1
Total formal votes		56,304	94.6	−1.6
Informal votes		3,196	5.4	+1.6
Turnout		59,500	93.8	−1.7
Party total votes
Labor		30,736	54.6	+8.0
Liberal		14,483	25.7	−7.7
Greens		9,659	17.2	+7.1
Group C		731	1.3	+1.3
Independent	Caroline Larner	435	0.8	+0.8
Group E		260	0.5	+0.5

=== Elections in the 1990s ===
==== 1998 ====
1998 Tasmanian state election: Lyons
Party	Candidate	Votes	%	±%
Quota		10,281		
Labor	David Llewellyn (elected 2)	8,304	13.5	−2.4
Labor	Michael Polley (elected 3)	7,756	12.6	−0.5
Labor	Ken Bacon (elected 5)	6,213	10.1	+10.1
Labor	Lara Giddings	4,945	8.0	+4.5
Labor	Scott Wiggins	1,070	1.7	+1.7
Labor	Danial Rochford	474	0.8	+0.8
Liberal	Rene Hidding (elected 1)	6,896	11.2	+3.6
Liberal	Denise Swan (elected 4)	4,387	7.2	−0.9
Liberal	Bob Mainwaring	4,000	6.5	−2.3
Liberal	John Gee	3,514	5.7	+5.7
Liberal	Carmel Torenius	1,778	2.9	+2.9
Greens	Christine Milne	5,507	8.9	−0.8
Greens	Sonia Chirgwin	235	0.4	+0.4
Greens	Ted Field	201	0.3	+0.3
Greens	John Collins	144	0.2	+0.2
Greens	Neil Smith	138	0.2	+0.2
Tasmania First	Dave Pickford	2,036	3.3	+3.3
Tasmania First	Will Frank	1,238	2.0	+2.0
Tasmania First	Darryl Gerrity	1,182	1.9	+1.9
Tasmania First	M. Turner	869	1.4	+1.4
Tasmania First	Jack Kelly	797	1.3	+1.3
Total formal votes		61,684	96.2	+1.6
Informal votes		2,462	3.8	−1.6
Turnout		64,146	95.5	−0.8
Party total votes
Labor		28,762	46.6	+5.8
Liberal		20,575	33.4	−8.2
Greens		6,225	10.1	−1.3
Tasmania First		6,122	9.9	+9.9

==== 1996 ====
1996 Tasmanian state election: Lyons
Party	Candidate	Votes	%	±%
Quota		7,616		
Liberal	Bob Mainwaring (elected 3)	5,335	8.8	+3.9
Liberal	Denise Swan (elected 7)	4,926	8.1	+4.4
Liberal	Rene Hidding (elected 6)	4,626	7.6	+7.6
Liberal	Graeme Page	4,572	7.5	+3.4
Liberal	Malcolm Cleland	2,405	3.9	−0.1
Liberal	His Grace the Most Noble Duke of Avram	1,863	3.1	+0.6
Liberal	Stephen Salter	1,615	2.7	+2.7
Labor	David Llewellyn (elected 1)	9,817	16.1	+6.0
Labor	Michael Polley (elected 2)	7,981	13.1	+2.7
Labor	Lara Giddings (elected 4)	2,162	3.5	+3.5
Labor	Dudley Parker	1,468	2.4	+2.4
Labor	Pat Tate	1,249	2.1	+1.0
Labor	Andrew MacGregor	1,248	2.0	+2.0
Labor	Martin Clifford	927	1.5	+1.5
Greens	Christine Milne (elected 5)	5,917	9.7	−0.5
Greens	Annie Willock	207	0.3	+0.3
Greens	Deborah Lynch	195	0.3	+0.3
Greens	Glenn Millar	171	0.3	+0.3
Greens	Laurie Goldsworthy	168	0.3	0.0
Greens	Stuart Lennox	152	0.2	+0.2
Greens	Kim Imber	131	0.2	+0.2
National	Peter Murray	806	1.3	+1.3
National	David Tomkinson	357	0.6	+0.6
National	Paul Pinder	222	0.4	+0.4
National	Rick Wright	204	0.3	+0.3
National	Julia Gulson	177	0.3	+0.3
National	Christopher Parry	137	0.2	+0.2
Group C	Max Burr	927	1.5	+1.5
Group C	Paul Ashley	45	0.1	+0.1
Independent	Darryl Gerrity	516	0.8	+0.8
Extremely Greedy 40%	Annie Beecroft	214	0.4	+0.4
Extremely Greedy 40%	Andrea Long	185	0.3	+0.3
Total formal votes		60,925	94.6	−0.7
Informal votes		3,458	5.4	+0.7
Turnout		64,383	96.3	+1.1
Party total votes
Liberal		25,342	41.6	−16.3
Labor		24,852	40.8	+13.9
Greens		6,941	11.4	−0.9
National		1,903	3.1	+3.1
Group C		972	1.6	+1.6
Independent	Darryl Gerrity	516	0.8	+0.8
Extremely Greedy 40%		399	0.7	+0.7

==== 1992 ====
1992 Tasmanian state election: Lyons
Party	Candidate	Votes	%	±%
Quota		7,362		
Liberal	Robin Gray (elected 1)	18,751	31.8	−3.9
Liberal	Ian Braid (elected 2)	4,096	7.0	+3.7
Liberal	Bob Mainwaring (elected 7)	2,872	4.9	+2.3
Liberal	Graeme Page (elected 6)	2,386	4.0	+1.7
Liberal	Malcolm Cleland	2,369	4.0	+4.0
Liberal	Denise Swan	2,171	3.7	+3.7
Liberal	The Duke of Avram	1,483	2.5	−0.9
Labor	Michael Polley (elected 5)	6,123	10.4	−0.3
Labor	David Llewellyn (elected 4)	5,943	10.1	+3.1
Labor	Chris Batt	1,421	2.4	−1.7
Labor	Peter Gilmore	684	1.2	+1.2
Labor	Pat Tate	633	1.1	+1.1
Labor	Eugene Alexander	631	1.1	+1.1
Labor	Brian Smith	430	0.7	+0.7
Independent Greens	Christine Milne (elected 3)	6,025	10.2	−6.0
Independent Greens	Diane Masters	501	0.9	+0.5
Independent Greens	Noel Harper	221	0.4	+0.4
Independent Greens	Laurie Goldsworthy	180	0.3	0.0
Independent Greens	Tess Schramm	111	0.2	+0.2
Independent Greens	Jeremy Pearce	107	0.2	+0.2
Independent Greens	Phil Forward	84	0.1	+0.1
Advance Tasmania	Dudley Parker	500	0.8	+0.8
Advance Tasmania	Simon Edmunds	349	0.6	+0.6
Advance Tasmania	Bill Chugg	195	0.3	+0.3
Advance Tasmania	Les Whittle	152	0.3	+0.3
Independent	Ian Jamieson	299	0.5	+0.5
Independent	John Davidson	176	0.3	+0.3
Total formal votes		58,893	95.3	+1.0
Informal votes		2,911	4.7	−1.0
Turnout		61,804	95.2	+1.3
Party total votes
Liberal		34,128	57.9	+6.5
Labor		15,865	26.9	−4.1
Independent Greens		7,229	12.3	−4.5
Advance Tasmania		1,196	2.0	+2.0
Independent	Ian Jamieson	299	0.5	+0.5
Independent	John Davidson	176	0.3	+0.3

=== Elections in the 1980s ===
==== 1989 ====
1989 Tasmanian state election: Lyons
Party	Candidate	Votes	%	±%
Quota		6,857		
Liberal	Robin Gray (elected 1)	19,585	35.7	−6.5
Liberal	The Duke of Avram (elected 6)	1,881	3.4	+3.4
Liberal	Ian Braid (elected 4)	1,792	3.3	−0.8
Liberal	Bob Mainwaring	1,435	2.6	−0.3
Liberal	Graeme Page (elected 5)	1,258	2.3	−0.6
Liberal	Ron Limb	1,158	2.1	+2.1
Liberal	Stephen Salter	1,092	2.0	−1.1
Labor	Michael Polley (elected 3)	5,874	10.7	−2.0
Labor	David Llewellyn (elected 7)	3,856	7.0	−2.2
Labor	Terry Field	2,990	5.5	+5.5
Labor	Chris Batt	2,246	4.1	+0.9
Labor	Wendy Carnicelli	1,010	1.8	+1.8
Labor	Gary Whitney	700	1.3	+1.3
Labor	Carole Coppleman	348	0.6	+0.6
Independent Greens	Christine Milne (elected 2)	8,868	16.2	+16.2
Independent Greens	Diane Masters	209	0.4	+0.4
Independent Greens	Laurie Goldsworthy	150	0.3	+0.3
Democrats	Liz Holloway	202	0.4	+0.4
Democrats	Sarah Hancock	201	0.4	+0.4
Total formal votes		54,855	94.3	+0.3
Informal votes		3,310	5.7	−0.3
Turnout		58,165	93.9	−0.3
Party total votes
Liberal		28,201	51.4	−8.0
Labor		17,024	31.0	−5.9
Independent Greens		9,227	16.8	+16.8
Democrats		403	0.7	+0.7

==== 1986 ====
1986 Tasmanian state election: Lyons
Party	Candidate	Votes	%	±%
Quota		6,400		
Liberal	Robin Gray (elected 1)	21,615	42.2	+10.0
Liberal	Ian Braid (elected 3)	2,097	4.1	−3.7
Liberal	Stephen Salter	1,573	3.1	+1.1
Liberal	Bob Mainwaring (elected 7)	1,496	2.9	+2.9
Liberal	Graeme Page (elected 6)	1,484	2.9	−0.9
Liberal	Helen Brock	1,277	2.5	+2.5
Liberal	Jim Hay	890	1.7	+1.7
Labor	Michael Polley (elected 2)	6,480	12.7	+0.8
Labor	David Llewellyn (elected 4)	4,700	9.2	+9.2
Labor	Darrel Baldock (elected 5)	2,935	5.7	−5.7
Labor	Chris Batt	1,635	3.2	+0.9
Labor	Andrew Lohrey	1,273	2.5	−2.9
Labor	Lynden Leppard	960	1.9	+1.9
Labor	Fritz Robinson	932	1.8	+1.8
Independent	Bill Chugg	1,850	3.6	+3.6
Total formal votes		51,197	94.0	−0.2
Informal votes		3,262	6.0	+0.2
Turnout		54,459	94.2	0.0
Party total votes
Liberal		30,432	59.4	+8.6
Labor		18,915	36.9	−4.9
Independent	Bill Chugg	1,850	3.6	+3.6

==== 1982 ====
1982 Tasmanian state election: Wilmot
Party	Candidate	Votes	%	±%
Quota		6,289		
Liberal	Robin Gray (elected 1)	16,233	32.3	+10.1
Liberal	Ian Braid (elected 2)	3,935	7.8	−0.9
Liberal	Graeme Page (elected 5)	1,935	3.8	−0.8
Liberal	Bruce Stewart	1,140	2.3	+2.3
Liberal	Stephen Salter (elected 6)	1,031	2.0	+1.2
Liberal	Edyth Langham	719	1.4	+1.4
Liberal	Kim Oswin	564	1.1	+1.1
Labor	Michael Polley (elected 4)	5,996	11.9	−3.0
Labor	Darrel Baldock (elected 3)	5,751	11.4	−1.6
Labor	Terry Aulich	3,619	7.2	−0.5
Labor	Andrew Lohrey (elected 7)	2,723	5.4	−6.4
Labor	Chris Batt	1,168	2.3	+2.3
Labor	Marguerite Scott	674	1.3	+1.3
Labor	Ken Smith	564	1.1	−0.4
Labor	Tony Beckerath	527	1.0	+1.0
Democrats	Liz Holloway	1,058	2.1	+2.1
Democrats	Nigel Burch	762	1.5	+1.5
Group C	Jeff Weston	729	1.4	+1.4
Group C	John Reed	379	0.8	+0.8
Independent	Gregory Suitor	324	0.6	+0.6
Independent	Len De Kok	196	0.4	+0.4
Independent	Adrian Brettingham-Moore	192	0.4	+0.4
Independent	John Clune	90	0.2	+0.2
Total formal votes		50,309	94.2	−1.6
Informal votes		3,085	5.8	+1.6
Turnout		53,394	94.2	−0.4
Party total votes
Liberal		25,557	50.8	+7.3
Labor		21,022	41.8	−13.8
Democrats		1,820	3.6	+3.6
Group C		1,108	2.2	+2.2
Independent	Gregory Suitor	324	0.6	+0.6
Independent	Len De Kok	196	0.4	+0.4
Independent	Adrian Brettingham-Moore	192	0.4	+0.4
Independent	John Clune	90	0.2	+0.2

=== Elections in the 1970s ===
==== 1979 ====
1979 Tasmanian state election: Wilmot
Party	Candidate	Votes	%	±%
Labor	Michael Polley (elected 2)	7,090	14.9	−2.0
Labor	Darrel Baldock (elected 3)	6,183	13.0	−0.2
Labor	Andrew Lohrey (elected 4)	5,642	11.8	+4.0
Labor	Terry Aulich (elected 7)	3,690	7.7	+4.6
Labor	Geoffrey Woods	2,051	4.3	+4.3
Labor	Brian Smith	1,180	2.5	+2.5
Labor	Ken Smith	717	1.5	+1.5
Liberal	Robin Gray (elected 1)	10,615	22.2	+12.5
Liberal	Ian Braid (elected 5)	4,173	8.7	+0.5
Liberal	Graeme Page (elected 6)	2,192	4.6	−1.1
Liberal	Geoff Squibb	1,548	3.2	+3.2
Liberal	Margaret Peacock	1,387	2.9	+2.9
Liberal	David Rubock	449	0.9	+0.9
Liberal	Stephen Salter	382	0.8	+0.8
Independent	Fred Woods	437	0.9	+0.9
Total formal votes		47,736	95.8	−0.3
Informal votes		2,067	4.2	+0.3
Turnout		49,803	94.6	−1.1
Party total votes
Labor		26,553	55.6	+2.5
Liberal		20,746	43.5	−1.5
Independent	Fred Woods	437	0.9	+0.9

==== 1976 ====
1976 Tasmanian state election: Wilmot
Party	Candidate	Votes	%	±%
Quota		5,948		
Labor	Michael Polley (elected 1)	8,055	16.9	+5.7
Labor	Darrel Baldock (elected 2)	6,265	13.2	+6.0
Labor	Andrew Lohrey (elected 4)	3,704	7.8	−2.2
Labor	Charles Batt	3,094	6.5	+0.4
Labor	Gordon Edhouse	1,573	3.3	+3.3
Labor	Terry Aulich (elected 5)	1,483	3.1	+3.1
Labor	Graham Vertigan	578	1.2	+1.2
Labor	Allan Rhodes	521	1.0	+1.0
Liberal	Robin Gray (elected 3)	4,632	9.7	+9.7
Liberal	Ian Braid (elected 6)	3,891	8.2	+1.8
Liberal	Graeme Page (elected 7)	2,694	5.7	+5.7
Liberal	Trevor Roach	2,231	4.7	+4.7
Liberal	Bob Ingamells	2,207	4.6	−0.6
Liberal	D L Youd	1,971	4.1	+4.1
Liberal	Jim Burn	1,649	3.5	+3.5
Liberal	Bert Bessell	1,306	2.7	−1.7
Liberal	Clyde FitzGerald	1,029	2.2	+2.2
United Tasmania	Anthony Burke	343	0.7	+0.7
United Tasmania	Anthony Joyce	63	0.1	+0.1
United Tasmania	Roy Jackson	49	0.1	+0.1
Workers	Stewart Lester	253	0.5	+0.5
Workers	Kevin Chaffey	46	0.1	+0.1
Independent	Stan King	125	0.3	+0.3
Total formal votes		47,582	96.1	−0.3
Informal votes		1,946	3.9	+0.3
Turnout		49,528	95.7	0.0
Party total votes
Labor		25,273	53.1	−3.9
Liberal		21,430	45.0	+2.9
United Tasmania		455	1.0	+1.0
Workers		299	0.6	+0.6
Independent	Stan King	125	0.3	+0.3

==== 1972 ====
1972 Tasmanian state election: Wilmot
Party	Candidate	Votes	%	±%
Quota		4,978		
Labor	Michael Polley (elected 3)	4,456	11.2	+11.2
Labor	Andrew Lohrey (elected 4)	3,992	10.0	+10.0
Labor	Roy Fagan (elected 2)	3,543	8.9	−3.9
Labor	Darrel Baldock (elected 5)	2,859	7.2	+7.2
Labor	William Anderson	2,543	6.4	−2.2
Labor	Charles Batt	2,422	6.1	+6.1
Labor	Douglas Cashion	2,384	6.0	−3.0
Labor	Peter Lawson	482	1.2	+1.2
Liberal	Angus Bethune (elected 1)	6,092	15.3	−1.9
Liberal	Ian Braid	2,537	6.4	+2.8
Liberal	Bob Ingamells (elected 6)	2,077	5.2	−5.2
Liberal	Reginald Chopping	1,921	4.8	+4.8
Liberal	Bert Bessell (elected 7)	1,754	4.4	−5.0
Liberal	Donald Paterson	1,292	3.2	+3.2
Liberal	Peter Patmore	757	1.9	+1.9
Liberal	Donald Smith	323	0.8	+0.8
Group B	Bruce Hill	314	0.8	+0.8
Group B	Norman Murfet	71	0.2	+0.2
Total formal votes		39,819	96.4	+1.3
Informal votes		1,480	3.6	−1.3
Turnout		41,299	95.7	+0.3
Party total votes
Labor		22,681	57.0	+10.5
Liberal		16,753	42.1	−5.9
Group B		385	1.0	+1.0
