= Candidates of the 1996 Tasmanian state election =

The 1996 Tasmanian state election was held on 24 February 1996.

== House of Assembly ==
Sitting members are shown in bold text. Tickets that elected at least one MHA are highlighted in the relevant colour. Successful candidates are indicated by an asterisk (*).

=== Bass ===
Seven seats were up for election. The Labor Party was defending two seats. The Liberal Party was defending four seats. The Tasmanian Greens were defending one seat.

Labor candidates	Liberal candidates	Greens candidates	National candidates	Greedy 40% candidates	Ungrouped candidates
Jim Cox*; Peter Daniel; **Gill James***; Lynda Jones; **Peter Patmore***; Helen Polley; Dee Potter; Alan Stacey	Bob Andrew; **Tony Benneworth***; **John Beswick***; David Fry; **Frank Madill***; **Sue Napier***; Peter Smith	**Lance Armstrong**; Daisy Cameron; Louise Fairfax; David James; David Obendorf; Rodney O'Keefe; Elizabeth Smith	Brian Boulton; Barry Jefferies	Erik Barratt-Peacock; Peter Heading	Ron Rice

=== Braddon ===
Seven seats were up for election. The Labor Party was defending one seat. The Liberal Party was defending five seats. The Tasmanian Greens were defending one seat.

Labor candidates	Liberal candidates	Greens candidates	National candidates	Greedy 40% candidates	Group B candidates	Ungrouped candidates
Jim Altimira; Brenton Best*; Yvonne Bird; **Michael Field***; Mike Gard; Bryan Green; Greg Richardson; Sally Schnackenberg	Ray Baldock; **Bill Bonde***; **Carole Cains**; **Ron Cornish***; **Roger Groom***; **Tony Rundle***; Michael Wickham	Faye Dixon; **Di Hollister***; Jo Kelly; Paul O'Halloran; Jon Paice; Eddie Storace; John Wilson	Henry Eiler; Grant Goodwin; Virginia Holmes; George Lee; Geoff Leslie; Steve Stevenson	Patrick Carnuccio; Martin Duffy	David Bissett; Laurie Heathorn	John Mackenzie; Andrew Vanderfeen

=== Denison ===
Seven seats were up for election. The Labor Party was defending three seats. The Liberal Party was defending three seats. The Tasmanian Greens were defending one seat.

Labor candidates	Liberal candidates	Greens candidates	National candidates	Greedy 40% candidates	Group D candidates	Group F candidates	Ungrouped candidates
**Julian Amos**; Jim Bacon*; **Judy Jackson***; Bob Riep; Stuart Slade; Cora Trevarthen; **John White***; Pam Wright	Nell Ames; **John Barker**; Bob Cheek*; Jane Goodluck; **Ray Groom***; **Michael Hodgman***; Hans Willink	Dick Friend; Kath Hughes; Peter Jones; Margie Law; Trish Moran; **Peg Putt***; Ann Wessing	Ian Coggins; Kevin Pelham	Chris Kelly; Jenny Sheridan	Informal; Janet Locke	Jeff Briscoe; Sharon Howett	Austra Maddox

=== Franklin ===
Seven seats were up for election. The Labor Party was defending three seats. The Liberal Party was defending three seats. The Tasmanian Greens were defending one seat.

Labor candidates	Liberal candidates	Greens candidates	National candidates	Greedy 40% candidates	Democrats candidates	Group C candidates	Ungrouped candidates
Eugene Alexander; **Fran Bladel***; Simon Boughey; Greg Cooper; **Paul Lennon***; **John Sheppard**; Lin Thorp; Paula Wriedt*	**John Cleary***; **Brian Davison**; Bob Gozzi; Paul Harriss; **Peter Hodgman***; Edyth Langham; Martin McManus	Adam Bowden; Julian Bush; Kay Carolin-McFarlane; Louise Crossley; **Mike Foley***; Marie Giblin; Penny King	Bill Darling; Pat Rogers	Robert Cowburn; Tracey Newman	Liz Burton; Rob Farrington; Leonie Godridge; Richard James	Bruce Goodluck*; Catherine Goodluck	John Devereux; Chester Somerville

=== Lyons ===
Seven seats were up for election. The Labor Party was defending two seats. The Liberal Party was defending four seats. The Tasmanian Greens were defending one seat.

Labor candidates	Liberal candidates	Greens candidates	National candidates	Greedy 40% candidates	Group C candidates	Ungrouped candidates
Martin Clifford; Lara Giddings*; **David Llewellyn***; Andrew MacGregor; Dudley Parker; **Michael Polley***; Pat Tate	Malcolm Cleland; Rene Hidding*; **Bob Mainwaring***; **Graeme Page**; Stephen Salter; **Denise Swan***; The Duke of Avram	Laurie Goldsworthy; Kim Imber; Stuart Lennox; Deborah Lynch; Glenn Millar; **Christine Milne***; Annie Willock	Julia Gulson; Peter Murray; Christopher Parry; Paul Pinder; David Tomkinson; Rick Wright	Annie Beecroft; Andrea Long	Paul Ashley; Max Burr	Darryl Gerrity

== See also ==
- Members of the Tasmanian House of Assembly, 1992–1996
- Members of the Tasmanian House of Assembly, 1996–1998
