= Results of the 1986 Tasmanian state election =

Tasmanian state election, 8 February 1986 House of Assembly << 1982–1989 >>
Enrolled voters	290,277				
Votes cast	272,306		Turnout	93.81	+0.34
Informal votes	16,145		Informal	5.93	+0.27
Summary of votes by party
Party	Primary votes	%	Swing	Seats	Change
Liberal	138,836	54.20	+5.68	19	± 0
Labor	90,003	35.14	–1.72	14	± 0
Ind. Green	14,227	5.55	+3.84	2	+ 1
Democrats	5,272	2.06	–3.33	0	± 0
Independent	6,385	3.05	+0.50	0	± 0
Other			–4.97	0	– 1
Total	256,161			35	

This is a list of House of Assembly results for the 1986 Tasmanian election.

== Results by division ==
=== Bass ===
1986 Tasmanian state election: Bass
Party	Candidate	Votes	%	±%
Quota		6,388		
Liberal	Peter Rae (elected 1)	10,604	20.7	+20.7
Liberal	Frank Madill (elected 4)	4,376	8.6	+8.6
Liberal	Neil Robson (elected 5)	4,322	8.4	−15.7
Liberal	John Beswick (elected 7)	3,722	7.3	+0.7
Liberal	Max Bushby	2,708	5.3	−0.7
Liberal	Brendan Lyons	1,788	3.5	−1.7
Liberal	Don Jones	1,202	2.3	+2.3
Labor	Harry Holgate (elected 2)	5,648	11.1	−2.1
Labor	Peter Patmore (elected 3)	5,205	10.2	+8.1
Labor	Gill James (elected 6)	3,775	7.4	−1.1
Labor	John McDonald	1,646	3.2	+3.2
Labor	Geoff Carr	1,321	2.6	+2.6
Labor	Wendy Carnicelli	1,125	2.2	+1.0
Labor	David Hanlon	396	0.8	+0.8
Democrats	Nick Goldie	1,890	3.7	+2.8
Democrats	Kathleen Maxwell	884	1.7	+1.7
Democrats	Michael Preece	489	1.0	+1.0
Total formal votes		51,101	93.4	−0.8
Informal votes		3,615	6.6	+0.8
Turnout		54,716	93.5	−0.4
Party total votes
Liberal		28,722	56.2	+5.9
Labor		19,116	37.4	+0.8
Democrats		3,263	6.4	+2.5

=== Braddon ===
1986 Tasmanian state election: Braddon
Party	Candidate	Votes	%	±%
Quota		6,460		
Liberal	Roger Groom (elected 1)	9,681	18.7	+8.1
Liberal	Ron Cornish (elected 2)	5,684	11.0	+0.8
Liberal	Tony Rundle (elected 3)	5,563	10.8	+7.1
Liberal	Bill Bonde (elected 7)	3,868	7.5	+7.5
Liberal	Vince Smith	3,030	5.9	−0.6
Liberal	Gerald O'Dea	2,126	4.1	+4.1
Liberal	Carol Thomson	1,123	2.2	+2.2
Labor	Greg Peart (elected 4)	4,808	9.3	+9.3
Labor	Michael Field (elected 5)	4,488	8.7	−0.7
Labor	Michael Weldon (elected 6)	3,945	7.6	+1.4
Labor	John Coughlan	2,170	4.2	−6.2
Labor	Glen Davies	1,333	2.6	−4.8
Labor	Robin Lohrey	499	1.0	+1.0
Labor	Marjorie Luck	354	0.7	+0.7
Democrats	Greg Sergeant	1,132	2.2	+2.2
Democrats	Kent Taylor	877	1.7	+1.7
Independent	Les Woods	992	1.9	+1.9
Total formal votes		51,673	94.8	−0.2
Informal votes		2,836	5.2	+0.2
Turnout		54,509	94.8	+2.1
Party total votes
Liberal		31,075	60.1	+10.3
Labor		17,597	34.1	−7.2
Democrats		2,009	3.9	−0.1
Independent	Les Woods	992	1.9	+1.9

=== Denison ===
1986 Tasmanian state election: Denison
Party	Candidate	Votes	%	±%
Quota		6,464		
Liberal	Ray Groom (elected 1)	8,406	16.3	+16.3
Liberal	John Bennett (elected 3)	4,547	8.8	+8.8
Liberal	Geoff Davis (elected 5)	2,570	5.0	0.0
Liberal	Carmel Holmes	2,489	4.8	+3.4
Liberal	John Barker	1,339	2.6	+2.6
Liberal	Peter Walker	1,193	2.3	−2.4
Liberal	Clem Hoggett	1,078	2.1	+2.1
Liberal	Andrew Hurburgh	946	1.8	+1.8
Labor	Neil Batt (elected 6)	3,578	6.9	+6.9
Labor	Judy Jackson (elected 4)	3,516	6.8	+6.8
Labor	John White (elected 7)	3,203	6.2	+6.2
Labor	Julian Amos	2,017	3.9	−4.6
Labor	Bob Gordon	1,795	3.5	+3.5
Labor	Bob Graham	1,437	2.8	−1.6
Labor	Dee Alty	389	0.8	+0.8
Independent Greens	Bob Brown (elected 2)	8,056	15.6	+7.4
Independent Greens	Judy Richter	171	0.3	+0.3
Independent	Brian Miller	3,374	6.5	+6.5
Group D	Gabriel Haros	1,269	2.5	+2.5
Group D	Bernard Devine	124	0.2	+0.2
Independent	Chris Munday	214	0.4	+0.4
Total formal votes		51,711	93.9	−0.5
Informal votes		3,374	6.1	+0.5
Turnout		55,085	92.7	0.0
Party total votes
Liberal		22,568	43.6	−5.2
Labor		15,935	30.8	+2.2
Independent Greens		8,227	15.9	+7.6
Independent	Brian Miller	3,374	6.5	+6.5
Group D		1,393	2.7	+2.7
Independent	Chris Munday	214	0.4	+0.4

=== Franklin ===
1986 Tasmanian state election: Franklin
Party	Candidate	Votes	%	±%
Quota		6,310		
Liberal	Peter Hodgman (elected 1)	8,919	17.7	+17.7
Liberal	Nick Evers (elected 5)	4,092	8.1	+8.1
Liberal	Geoff Pearsall (elected 3)	4,027	8.0	−5.1
Liberal	John Beattie (elected 4)	3,992	7.9	+0.2
Liberal	John Cleary	3,448	6.8	−3.8
Liberal	Ivan Pearson	820	1.6	+1.6
Liberal	Colin Howlett	741	1.5	+1.5
Labor	Ken Wriedt (elected 2)	8,507	16.8	−9.0
Labor	Fran Bladel (elected 7)	2,726	5.4	+5.4
Labor	Nick Sherry	2,396	4.7	+4.7
Labor	Michael Aird	2,068	4.1	+1.9
Labor	Bill McKinnon	1,977	3.9	+1.6
Labor	Unc Jager	405	0.8	+0.8
Labor	John Forster	361	0.7	+0.7
Independent Greens	Gerry Bates (elected 6)	5,468	10.8	+10.8
Independent Greens	Patsy Harmsen	532	1.1	+1.1
Total formal votes		50,479	94.3	+0.3
Informal votes		3,058	5.7	−0.3
Turnout		53,537	94.0	0.0
Party total votes
Liberal		26,039	51.6	+8.5
Labor		18,440	36.5	+0.4
Independent Greens		6,000	11.9	+11.9

=== Lyons ===
1986 Tasmanian state election: Lyons
Party	Candidate	Votes	%	±%
Quota		6,400		
Liberal	Robin Gray (elected 1)	21,615	42.2	+10.0
Liberal	Ian Braid (elected 3)	2,097	4.1	−3.7
Liberal	Stephen Salter	1,573	3.1	+1.1
Liberal	Bob Mainwaring (elected 7)	1,496	2.9	+2.9
Liberal	Graeme Page (elected 6)	1,484	2.9	−0.9
Liberal	Helen Brock	1,277	2.5	+2.5
Liberal	Jim Hay	890	1.7	+1.7
Labor	Michael Polley (elected 2)	6,480	12.7	+0.8
Labor	David Llewellyn (elected 4)	4,700	9.2	+9.2
Labor	Darrel Baldock (elected 5)	2,935	5.7	−5.7
Labor	Chris Batt	1,635	3.2	+0.9
Labor	Andrew Lohrey	1,273	2.5	−2.9
Labor	Lynden Leppard	960	1.9	+1.9
Labor	Fritz Robinson	932	1.8	+1.8
Independent	Bill Chugg	1,850	3.6	+3.6
Total formal votes		51,197	94.0	−0.2
Informal votes		3,262	6.0	+0.2
Turnout		54,459	94.2	0.0
Party total votes
Liberal		30,432	59.4	+8.6
Labor		18,915	36.9	−4.9
Independent	Bill Chugg	1,850	3.6	+3.6

== See also ==
- 1986 Tasmanian state election
- Members of the Tasmanian House of Assembly, 1986–1989
