= Members of the Tasmanian House of Assembly, 1996–1998 =

This is a list of members of the Tasmanian House of Assembly, elected at the 1996 state election:

Name	Party	Electorate	Years in office
Jim Bacon	Labor	Denison	1996–2004
Tony Benneworth	Liberal	Bass	1992–1998
Brenton Best	Labor	Braddon	1996–2014
Hon John Beswick	Liberal	Bass	1979–1998
Hon Fran Bladel	Labor	Franklin	1986–2002
Hon Bill Bonde	Liberal	Braddon	1986–2002
Carole Cains^{[2]}	Liberal	Braddon	1992–1996, 1997–1998
Bob Cheek	Liberal	Denison	1996–2002
Hon John Cleary	Liberal	Franklin	1979–1986, 1988–1998
Hon Ron Cornish	Liberal	Braddon	1976–1998
Jim Cox	Labor	Bass	1989–1992, 1996–2010
Hon Michael Field^{[1]}	Labor	Braddon	1976–1997
Mike Foley	Greens	Franklin	1995–1998
Mike Gard^{[1]}	Labor	Braddon	1997–1998
Lara Giddings	Labor	Lyons	1996–1998, 2002–2018
Bruce Goodluck	Independent	Franklin	1996–1998
Hon Ray Groom	Liberal	Denison	1986–2001
Hon Roger Groom^{[2]}	Liberal	Braddon	1976–1997
Rene Hidding	Liberal	Lyons	1996–2019
Hon Michael Hodgman	Liberal	Denison	1992–1998, 2001–2010
Hon Peter Hodgman	Liberal	Franklin	1986–2001
Di Hollister	Greens	Braddon	1989–1998
Hon Judy Jackson	Labor	Denison	1986–2006
Hon Gill James	Labor	Bass	1976–1989, 1992–2002
Paul Lennon	Labor	Franklin	1990–2008
Hon David Llewellyn	Labor	Lyons	1986–2010, 2014–2018
Hon Frank Madill	Liberal	Bass	1986–2000
Bob Mainwaring	Liberal	Lyons	1992–1998
Christine Milne	Greens	Lyons	1989–1998
Hon Sue Napier	Liberal	Bass	1992–2010
Hon Peter Patmore	Labor	Bass	1984–2002
Hon Michael Polley	Labor	Lyons	1972–2014
Peg Putt	Greens	Denison	1993–2008
Hon Tony Rundle	Liberal	Braddon	1986–2002
Hon Denise Swan	Liberal	Lyons	1995–2002
Hon John White	Labor	Denison	1986–1998
Paula Wriedt	Labor	Franklin	1996–2009

^{1} ALP member Michael Field resigned in early 1997. Mike Gard was elected as his replacement on 15 July.
^{2} Liberal member Roger Groom resigned in early 1997. Carole Cains was elected as his replacement on 15 July.

== Distribution of seats ==
Electorate	Seats held
Bass	
Braddon	
Denison	
Franklin	
Lyons	

Australian Labor Party - 14 seats (40%)
Liberal Party of Australia - 16 seats (46%)
Tasmanian Greens - 4 seats (11%)
Independent - 1 seat (3%)
