= Lara Giddings =

44th Premier of Tasmania

The Honourable Lara Giddings AO
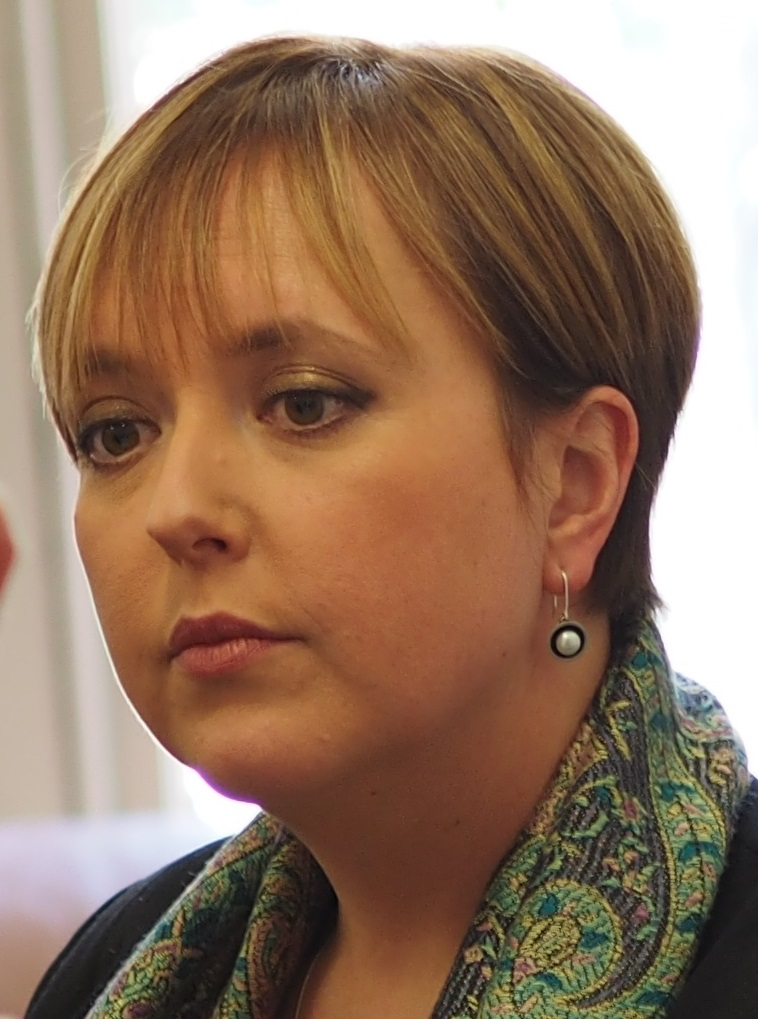
- Giddings in 2013

44th Premier of Tasmania
- In office 24 January 2011 – 31 March 2014
- Monarch: Elizabeth II
- Governor: Peter Underwood
- Deputy: Bryan Green
- Preceded by: David Bartlett
- Succeeded by: Will Hodgman

Deputy Premier of Tasmania
- In office 26 May 2008 – 24 January 2011
- Premier: David Bartlett
- Preceded by: David Bartlett
- Succeeded by: Bryan Green

Treasurer of Tasmania
- In office 6 December 2010 – 31 March 2014
- Premier: David Bartlett
- Preceded by: Michael Aird
- Succeeded by: Peter Gutwein

Member of the Tasmanian Parliament for Franklin
- In office 20 July 2002 – 3 March 2018

Member of the Tasmanian Parliament for Lyons
- In office 24 February 1996 – 29 August 1998

Personal details
- Born: Larissa Tahireh Giddings; 14 November 1972 (age 54) Goroka, Papua New Guinea
- Party: Labor
- Domestic partner: Ian Magill
- Children: 1 plus 4 stepchildren
- Education: University of Tasmania
- Occupation: Politician
- Website: laragiddings.com

Larissa Tahireh "Lara" Giddings (born 14 November 1972) is an Australian former politician who was the 44th Premier of Tasmania from 24 January 2011 until 31 March 2014, the first woman to hold the position. Born in Goroka, Papua New Guinea, she was a Labor Party member of the Tasmanian House of Assembly seat of Franklin from 2002 to 2018, and was the party's leader during her period as premier, replaced by Bryan Green after her government's defeat at the 2014 state election. Giddings came from the Labor Left faction. As of 2026, she remains the most recent premier of Tasmania from the Labor Party.

== Early years ==
Giddings was born on 14 November 1972 in Goroka, Papua New Guinea. As an adolescent, Giddings was educated at Methodist Ladies' College (MLC) in Melbourne as a boarder. At age 18, she joined the Australian Labor Party.

Giddings obtained Bachelor of Arts and Bachelor of Laws degrees from the University of Tasmania.

== Parliamentary career ==
Giddings was first elected to parliament in the 1996 election in the electorate of Lyons but was defeated at the 1998 election. Elected at the age of 23 years she was the youngest woman elected to an Australian Parliament.

After losing her seat in 1998, she went on to work in the Australian Senate as Whip's Clerk for Senator Kerry O'Brien, before travelling to Britain for a year at the end of 1999, where she did some temporary administrative work in London, and later worked as a Parliamentary research officer for the Member for Dunfermline East, Helen Eadie, in the Scottish Parliament.

Lara returned to Tasmania at the end of 2000 to work for the Tasmanian Premier (Jim Bacon) as a speech writer and media assistantand then as an electorate officer for the Hon. Fran Bladel, Member for Franklin in the State Parliament.

Giddings was elected one of the five members for the Tasmanian House of Assembly Division of Franklin in the 2002 Tasmanian election for the Labor Party. From 2004 to 2006, she was Minister for Economic Development and Minister for the Arts in the Labor government under Paul Lennon. Following the 2006 election, she became Minister for Health and Human Services. Shortly after the election, the State Government decided to proceed with building a replacement for the Royal Hobart Hospital and the significant task of planning the replacement came under Giddings' portfolio. In April 2007, she came under criticism for the poor conditions in the Emergency Department and blamed the federal government for under-funding.

On 26 May 2008, Lennon resigned from the premiership, and Deputy Premier, David Bartlett was elected party leader and became Premier, while Giddings was elected Deputy Leader and became Deputy Premier, becoming the second woman in Tasmanian history to hold the position.

On 23 January 2011, Bartlett stepped down as Premier of Tasmania, and stated that "Lara Giddings will be an outstanding Premier and will have my full support". The following day, the State Parliamentary Labor Party unanimously elected Giddings party leader, also becoming Premier. She was the first female Premier of Tasmania until her government's defeat on 15 March 2014. Following her government's defeat, Giddings opted to return to the backbench, the first defeated Premier to do so since Harry Holgate in 1982. Her deputy, Bryan Green, succeeded her as Tasmanian Labor leader.

On 14 May 2017, Giddings announced that she would be retiring from politics at the next Tasmanian state election.

== After politics ==
In March 2019, Giddings became chief executive of the Tasmanian branch of the Australian Medical Association (AMA).

== Private life ==
In 2011, Giddings stated that pursuit of her political career meant that she may never have children. In September 2017, Giddings announced she was pregnant at the age of 44 with the help of an egg donor. In January 2018, she gave birth to a baby girl with partner Ian Magill. This partnership consequently made her a step-mother of another four children from previous relationships.

== Honours ==
Giddings' official portrait was unveiled at Parliament House in Hobart in 2016.

On 16 August 2017, she was granted the use of the title "The Honourable" for life. Giddings was appointed an Officer of the Order of Australia in the 2024 Australia Day Honours for "distinguished service to the people and Parliament of Tasmania, and to the community".

== See also ==
- List of female heads of government in Australia

Tasmanian House of Assembly
Preceded by Ian Braid; David Llewellyn; Bob Mainwaring; Christine Milne; Graeme Page; Michael Polley; Denise Swan	Member for Lyons; 1996–1998; Served alongside: Rene Hidding; David Llewellyn; Michael Polley; Denise Swan	Succeeded by Ken Bacon; Rene Hidding; David Llewellyn; Michael Polley; Denise Swan
Preceded by Paul Lennon; Martin McManus; Neville Oliver; Matt Smith; Paula Wriedt	Member for Franklin; 2002–2018; Served alongside: Ross Butler (2008–2010); Paul Harriss (2014–2016); Will Hodgman (2002–2020); Daniel Hulme (2009–2010); Paul Lennon (2002–2008); Nick McKim (2002–2015); David O'Byrne (2010–2014); Jacquie Petrusma (2010–2022); Paula Wriedt (2002–2009)	Succeeded by Alison Standen
Political offices
Preceded by David Llewellyn	Attorney-General; Minister for Justice; 2008–2011	Succeeded by David Bartlett
Preceded by David Bartlett	Deputy Premier of Tasmania; 2008–2011	Succeeded by Bryan Green
Preceded by David O'Byrne	Minister for the Arts; 2010–2014	Succeeded by Vanessa Goodwin
Preceded by Michael Aird	Treasurer of Tasmania; 2010–2014	Succeeded by Peter Gutwein
Preceded by David Bartlett	Premier of Tasmania; 2011–2014	Succeeded by Will Hodgman
Party political offices
Preceded by David Bartlett	Leader of the Labor Party in Tasmania; 2011–2014	Succeeded by Bryan Green
