= Mark Shelton (Australian politician) =

Australian politician

Mark Shelton MP

33rd Speaker of the Tasmanian House of Assembly
- In office 22 June 2021 – 14 May 2024
- Preceded by: Sue Hickey
- Succeeded by: Michelle O'Byrne
- In office 17 October 2017 – 1 May 2018
- Preceded by: Elise Archer
- Succeeded by: Sue Hickey

Minister for Police, Fire and Emergency Management
- In office 2 July 2019 – 19 May 2021
- Preceded by: Michael Ferguson
- Succeeded by: Jacquie Petrusma

Minister for Local Government
- In office 2 July 2019 – 19 May 2021
- Preceded by: Peter Gutwein
- Succeeded by: Roger Jaensch

Member of the Tasmanian Parliament for Lyons
- Incumbent
- Assumed office 20 March 2010 Serving with 6 others

Personal details
- Born: 20 February 1959 (age 67) Launceston, Tasmania
- Party: Liberal Party
- Occupation: Politician

Mark David Shelton (born 20 February 1959) is an Australian politician who was the Speaker of the Tasmanian House of Assembly from June 2021 to May 2024, and previously served in the role from 2017 to 2018 He was previously the Minister for Police, Fire and Emergency Management and Minister for Local Government in the Hodgman and Gutwein Liberal Governments, and is a member for Lyons.

Shelton was Mayor of Meander Valley from 2003. In 2010, he was endorsed as a Liberal candidate for Lyons at the state election of that year. He defeated Jane Howlett for the final Liberal seat. He was re-elected in 2014, 2018 and 2021 with an increased primary vote each time.

Tasmanian House of Assembly
Preceded by Elise Archer	Speaker of the Tasmanian House of Assembly; 2017–2018	Succeeded by Sue Hickey
Preceded by Sue Hickey	Speaker of the Tasmanian House of Assembly; 2021–2024	Succeeded by Michelle O'Byrne
