= Carlo Di Falco =

Australian politician

Carlo Di Falco MP

Member of the Tasmanian House of Assembly for Lyons
- Incumbent
- Assumed office 19 July 2025 Serving with 6 others
- Preceded by: Andrew Jenner

Personal details
- Born: 1958 or 1959 (age 66–67)
- Party: Shooters, Fishers and Farmers
- Other political affiliations: Labor (formerly)

Carlo Di Falco is an Australian politician who was elected as a member for the Division of Lyons in the Tasmanian House of Assembly at the 2025 state election. He is the first member of the Shooters, Fishers and Farmers Party (SFF) elected in Tasmania.

== Personal life ==
Di Falco is the son of Italian immigrant parents. His father was a prisoner-of-war during World War II and worked as a builder's labourer after moving to Australia. His mother died of cancer when he was eight years old.

Di Falco worked as a tradesman for the Hobart City Council prior to his retirement in 2024. He settled on a property in Forcett in the 1990s.

== Politics ==
Di Falco is a former member of the Australian Labor Party (ALP). After joining the Shooters, Fishers and Farmers Party, he stood for parliament on eight occasions at the state and federal levels prior to his successful campaign in 2025.

With the 2025 election resulting in a hung parliament, Di Falco announced in August 2025 that he was open to negotiating a confidence and supply agreement with either the ALP or the Liberal Party.

=== Positions ===
At the 2025 election, Di Falco ran on a platform which included opposition to the proposed Macquarie Point Stadium and Marinus Link. He disputes the scientific consensus on climate change and is opposed to the construction of new wind farms in Tasmania. He is in favour of fixed four-year parliamentary terms for Tasmania.

On 13 November 2025, Di Falco voted for the draft order to enable the Macquarie Point site to undergo construction for the stadium precinct despite opposing it before the election. Di Falco in his speech in parliament on the order said that he initially misunderstood the issue, but since being elected he had spent time listening to supporters and opponents in the community, various business sector groups and the Tasmania Devils boss Brendon Gale, and now supported the stadium and AFL team despite serious reservations on costs.
