= Casey Farrell =

Australian politician (born 1988)

Member of the Tasmanian House of Assembly for Lyons
- In office 4 March 2025 – 19 July 2025
- Preceded by: Rebecca White
- Succeeded by: Brian Mitchell

Personal details
- Born: 26 February 1988 (age 38) Hobart, Tasmania, Australia
- Party: Tasmanian Labor Party
- Parent: Craig Farrell (father)
- Website: https://caseyfarrell.com.au/

Casey Jon Farrell (born 26 February 1988) is an Australian politician from Tasmania representing the Tasmanian Labor Party. In 2025, he was elected in a countback of votes from the 2024 election prompted by the resignation of Rebecca White, in the Tasmanian House of Assembly representing the Division of Lyons. He was a candidate in Lyons in the 2024 Tasmanian state election but was not elected. He was a candidate in the 2025 Tasmanian state election but was not elected.

== Personal life ==
Farrell is the elder son of the President of the Tasmanian Legislative Council Craig Farrell.

== See also ==
- Members of the Tasmanian House of Assembly, 2024–2025
