= Michael Weldon =

Australian politician

Michael William Weldon (born 20 December 1945) is an Australian former politician. He was born in Hobart, Tasmania. At the 1979 state election, he was elected to the Tasmanian House of Assembly as a Labor member for Braddon. Defeated at the 1982 election, he was re-elected in 1986 and served until his defeat in 1992. In 1999 he unsuccessfully contested the Legislative Council seat of Murchison.
