= Denise Swan =

Australian politician

The Honourable Denise Swan

Member of the Tasmanian House of Assembly for Lyons
- In office 12 December 1995 – 20 July 2002
- Preceded by: Robin Gray

Personal details
- Born: 19 July 1947 (age 78) Tasmania, Australia
- Party: Liberal Party
- Profession: Solicitor

Denise Elizabeth Swan (born 19 July 1947) is a former Australian politician, who was a Liberal member of the Tasmanian House of Assembly for the division of Lyons from 1995 to 2002.

Swan graduated with a Bachelor of Laws (LLB) from the University of Tasmania, where she resided at Jane Franklin Hall, then worked in the United Kingdom as a solicitor before returning to Tasmania.

On 12 December 1995, she was elected to the Tasmanian House of Assembly in a recount to replace Liberal Lyons MHA and former premier Robin Gray. She was appointed to Cabinet in the ministry of Tony Rundle from March 1996 to September 1998, where she held the portfolios of community development, the status of women, Aboriginal affairs, multicultural and ethnic affairs, and local government. She was granted the title "The Honourable" for life on 16 October 1998. In August 2001, Swan became deputy Liberal leader and Deputy Leader of the Opposition under Bob Cheek, however Swan and Cheek both lost their seats a year later at the 2002 state election.
