= Chris Batt =

Australian politician (born 1956)

- Born: 17 February 1956 (age 69)
- Occupation: Politician

Christopher Lawrence Batt (born 17 February 1956) is a former Australian politician. Batt was born in Hobart, Tasmania; he was the nephew of Neil Batt, who later served as Tasmanian Deputy Premier. He contested the 1986 state election as a Labor candidate for Lyons, but was not successful. However, in 1987 he was elected in a countback following the resignation of Labor MLA Darrel Baldock. Batt held his seat until he was defeated at the 1989 state election.
