= 1992 Tasmanian state election =

State election in Australia

- 1 February 1992

All 35 seats to the House of Assembly 18 seats needed for a majority

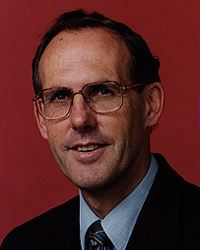
	First party	Second party	Third party
Leader	Ray Groom	Michael Field	Bob Brown
Party	Liberal	Labor	Ind. Green
Leader since	17 December 1991	14 December 1988	1983
Leader's seat	Denison	Braddon	Denison
Last election	17 seats	13 seats	5 seats
Seats won	19	11	5
Seat change	▲2	▼2	Steady
Popular vote	154,337	82,296	37,742
Percentage	54.11%	28.85%	13.23%
Swing	▲7.19	▼5.86	▼3.9
- Results of the election
Premier before election
Michael Field
Labor
Elected Premier
Ray Groom
Liberal

The 1992 Tasmanian state election was held on 1 February 1992 in the Australian state of Tasmania to elect 35 members of the Tasmanian House of Assembly. The election used the Hare-Clark proportional representation system — seven members were elected from each of five electorates. The quota required for election was 12.5% in each division.

The incumbent Labor Party minority government of Premier Michael Field, supported by the Green Independents led by Bob Brown, was defeated The Liberal Party under Ray Groom, which formed a majority government with Groom as Premier.

The Labor minority government had spent much of their term focusing on economic reform. The priority of the Field government was reducing state debt, which had the support of the Greens. Government cuts in spending, were able to help Tasmania reach its debt servicing commitments, but were a source of discontent in the community. The minority government succeeded until late 1991 when lobbying from the forestry industry caused Field to introduce legislation to protect the industry from conservation. The legislation had the support of the Liberal Party and passed both houses easily. However, the Greens withdrew their support of the government, prompting Labor to an election for February 1992.

The Liberal Party needed to win only one seat at this election to be returned into majority, and needed a primary vote swing of about 4.5 percent to gain that seat. Labor needed five seats to win an outright majority.

Minor parties contesting this election included Advance Tasmania; which ran candidates in each electorate. A political party called "More Jobs" fielded candidates in Denison.

== Results ==
The result saw a swing against the Labor Party and the Greens in the direction of the Liberal Party. The 7.19 percent swing to the Liberals—almost double what they needed to win government—assured Groom would have a secure majority in the next state parliament.

Although the Greens suffered a 3.90% swing against them, their primary vote of 13.23% statewide was above the required quota for election, and it was only in Bass and Braddon that they depended on a large flow of preferences to hold their seats.

The Labor Party polled poorly with a net loss of two members. The party lost four members; Michael Weldon in Braddon, former Premier Harry Holgate and Jim Cox in Bass, David Crean in Denison. The party gained two members; Gill James in Bass and Julian Amos in Denison. The fall in the Labor vote could be attributed to the instability of the Labor-Green accord, but also because of government spending cuts.

Minor parties and Independents collectively had an increase in votes, but were far from reaching the required quota for election.

This is the first successive election until 2024 in which Tasmanian voters were presented with a different Premier from the previous election.

Party	Votes	%	+/–	Seats	+/–
Liberal	154,337	54.11	▲7.19	19	▲2
Labor	82,296	28.85	▼5.86	11	▼2
Ind. Green	37,742	13.23	▼3.90	5	Steady
Advance Tasmania	7,263	2.55	New	0	New
Independents	3,228	1.13	▲0.79	0	Steady
More Jobs	356	0.12	New	0	New
Total	285,222	100.00	–	35	–
Valid votes	285,222	95.46			
Invalid/blank votes	13,557	4.54	▲1.90		
Total votes	298,779	100.00	–		
Registered voters/turnout	314,579	94.98	▼0.81		

=== Primary vote by division ===
	Bass	Braddon	Denison	Franklin	Lyons
Labor Party	29.6%	20.8%	33.3%	33.8%	26.9%
Liberal Party	56.5%	65.7%	43.9%	46.3%	57.9%
Independent Greens	11.4%	8.8%	17.9%	15.8%	12.3%
Other	2.5%	4.6%	4.9%	4.1%	2.8%

=== Distribution of seats ===
Electorate	Seats won
Bass	
Braddon	
Denison	
Franklin	
Lyons	

Labor
Liberal
Green

== See also ==
- Candidates of the 1992 Tasmanian state election
- Members of the Tasmanian House of Assembly, 1992–1996
