= Tony Benneworth =

Australian cricketer (1950–2018)

Personal information
- Full name: Anthony John Benneworth
- Born: 12 December 1950; Launceston, Tasmania, Australia
- Died: 10 March 2018 (aged 67); Ansons Bay, Tasmania, Australia
- Batting: Right-handed
- Bowling: Right-arm medium

Domestic team information
- Years: Team
- 1971–1981: Tasmania
- First-class debut: 22 December 1971 Tasmania v World XI
- Last First-class: 24 February 1979; Tasmania v New South Wales
- List A debut: 14 November 1972; Tasmania v South Australia
- Last List A: 7 November 1981 Tasmania v Queensland

Career statistics
Competition	First-class	List A
Matches	15	10
Runs scored	580	72
Batting average	23.20	9.00
100s/50s	0/3	0/0
Top score	75	21*
Balls bowled	2,247	510
Wickets	26	9
Bowling average	38.92	31.33
5 wickets in innings	1	0
10 wickets in match	0	0
Best bowling	5/115	3/14
Catches/stumpings	6/–	1/–
- Source: CricketArchive, 2 January 2011

Anthony John Benneworth (12 December 1950 – 10 March 2018) was an Australian cricketer who played for Tasmania from 1971 until 1979. He was a right-handed batsman and a right-arm medium-pace bowler.

He played in Tasmania's inaugural Sheffield Shield team in 1977–78. He was the first Tasmanian to take five wickets in an innings in a Sheffield Shield match, when he took 5 for 115, as well as making 54 and 42, against South Australia in February 1978.

Benneworth was the Liberal candidate for Bass in the 2001 federal election but lost to Labor's Michelle O'Byrne. From 1992 to 1998 he served in the Tasmanian House of Assembly.

He died in a boating accident off Ansons Bay, Tasmania on 10 March 2018.

== See also ==
- List of Tasmanian representative cricketers
