= Ray Groom =

Australian politician

The Honourable Ray Groom AO

39th Premier of Tasmania
- In office 17 February 1992 – 18 March 1996
- Monarch: Elizabeth II
- Governor: Sir Phillip Bennett; Sir Guy Green
- Deputy: John Beswick
- Preceded by: Michael Field
- Succeeded by: Tony Rundle

Member of the Tasmanian Parliament for Denison
- In office 8 February 1986 – 9 August 2001 Serving with Davis/Barker/Cheek; Jackson; Brown/Putt; Batt/Crean/Amos/Bacon; White; Bennett/Gibson/Hodgman

Member of the Australian Parliament for Braddon
- In office 13 December 1975 – 26 October 1984
- Preceded by: Ron Davies
- Succeeded by: Chris Miles

Personal details
- Born: Raymond John Groom; 3 September 1944 (age 82) Elsternwick, Victoria, Australia
- Party: Liberal Party of Australia
- Spouse: Gillian Groom (née Crisp) (m. 1967)
- Children: Matthew Groom
- Education: University of Melbourne
- Profession: Barrister; politician

Raymond John Groom AO (born 3 September 1944) is an Australian lawyer and former sportsman and politician, representing the Liberal Party in the Federal Parliament 1975–84 and the Tasmanian Parliament 1986–2001. He was a Federal and state minister for a total of 13 years. He was Premier of Tasmania from 1992 to 1996 and also served as Deputy Premier and Attorney-General.

== Early life ==
Ray Groom was born in Elsternwick, a suburb of Melbourne. His family moved to Tasmania when he was a young child. He attended schools in both Victoria and Tasmania.

== Australian rules football career ==
Groom initially played senior Australian rules football in Tasmania with the Cooee Football Club commencing at 16 years of age. He represented the North Western Football Union and Tasmania before joining the Victorian Football League (VFL) club Melbourne in 1963. He played 96 senior games with Melbourne at centre half forward, as a ruck rover and at centre half back. On Ron Barassi's retirement, Groom was invited by Melbourne coach Norm Smith to wear the club's prized Number 31 guernsey. He represented Victoria and won the Keith 'Bluey' Truscott Medal as Melbourne's Best and Fairest player in 1968. Groom later represented Tasmania at the 1969 National Carnival in Adelaide.

=== Playing statistics ===
Legend
G	Goals	K	Kicks	D	Disposals	T	Tackles
B	Behinds	H	Handballs	M	Marks	H/O	Hit-outs

Season	Team	No.	Games	Totals								Averages (per game)							
Season	Team	No.	Games	G	B	K	H	D	M	T	H/O	G	B	K	H	D	M	T	H/O
1963	Melbourne	15	19	17	—N/a	—N/a	—N/a	—N/a	—N/a	—N/a	—N/a	0.9	—N/a	—N/a	—N/a	—N/a	—N/a	—N/a	—N/a
1964	Melbourne	15	12	9	—N/a	—N/a	—N/a	—N/a	—N/a	—N/a	—N/a	0.8	—N/a	—N/a	—N/a	—N/a	—N/a	—N/a	—N/a
1965	Melbourne	31	8	2	5	52	20	72	18	—N/a	—N/a	0.3	0.6	6.5	2.5	9.0	2.3	—N/a	—N/a
1966	Melbourne	31	16	7	9	181	47	228	50	—N/a	80	0.4	0.6	11.3	2.9	14.3	3.1	—N/a	5.3
1967	Melbourne	31	18	1	2	212	42	254	71	—N/a	136	0.1	0.1	11.8	2.3	14.1	3.9	—N/a	7.6
1968	Melbourne	31	19	0	0	246	28	274	76	—N/a	34	0.0	0.0	12.9	1.5	14.4	4.0	—N/a	1.9
Career			92	36	16	691	137	828	215	—N/a	250	0.4	0.3	11.3	2.2	13.6	3.5	—N/a	4.9

== Athletics ==
Groom won state titles in both Tasmania and Victoria as a sprinter and long jumper. In 1962, at 18 years of age, he represented Tasmania at the National Athletics Championships in Sydney, was a nationally ranked athlete and was chosen as a member of the Australian Commonwealth Games selection squad.

== Early legal career ==
After obtaining a Bachelor of Laws from the University of Melbourne in 1967 Groom practised as a barrister and solicitor in Melbourne and later in Tasmania. He was a partner in the Tasmanian firm of Crisp, Hudson & Mann and appeared regularly in the Supreme Court of Tasmania on trial and appeal matters and the Magistrates Courts.

== Political career ==
=== Federal politics ===
Groom first stood for the House of Representatives seat of Braddon in 1974 at the age of 30 but was unsuccessful. In 1975 he ran for Braddon again and won, and held it until 1984. His 1975 election result was significant in that as a Liberal candidate he outpolled a Labor opponent on the West Coast of Tasmania, the first time this had ever occurred. In the 1974 and 1983 Australian federal elections, he achieved the largest swing of any Liberal candidate in the nation. Between the election of 1974 and his last election in 1983, the Liberal two-party vote in Braddon increased from 38% to 63%.

He served in the second Fraser Ministry as Minister for Environment, Housing and Community Development from December 1977 to December 1978 and then Minister for Housing and Construction until November 1980.

He retired from the Australian Parliament immediately prior to the 1984 election.

=== State politics ===
Groom and his family moved from Burnie to Hobart at the end of 1984 and he was then appointed senior advisor to the Tasmanian Premier Robin Gray.

In 1986 he re-entered politics as a member for Denison in the Tasmanian House of Assembly, topping the poll in that electorate. He immediately became the Minister for Forests, Mines and Sea Fisheries. In November 1988, he became deputy leader of the state Liberal Party and hence Deputy Premier of Tasmania. He became deputy opposition leader after the Liberals' defeat in 1989. In 1991, he successfully challenged Gray's leadership and became Tasmanian state leader of the Liberal Party.

==== Premier of Tasmania ====
Groom became Premier of Tasmania after leading the Liberals to victory in the 1992 state election with a majority of 19 seats on a swing of over seven percent.

After the 1996 election, the Liberals suffered a three-seat swing, losing their majority. The balance of power rested with the Australian Greens, but the Labor Party refused to enter into any agreement with them. This left a Liberal minority government supported by the Greens as the only realistic option. However, Groom had promised before the election that he would only govern in majority and resigned. He was replaced by Tony Rundle, who quickly reached an agreement with the Greens. He remained in Parliament until 2001, serving as Attorney-General, Minister for Tourism and Minister for Workplace Standards until the 1998 election, when the Rundle Government was defeated.

== Life after politics ==
Groom is actively involved in community affairs and has been a chairman/director of several community organisations since retiring from politics. He is a former chairman of Southern Cross Care Tasmania and Southern Cross Care Australia.

Since retiring from parliament, he has practised as a barrister and solicitor and as an arbitrator and mediator. He was appointed a Deputy President of the Australian Administrative Appeals Tribunal in 2004 and continues in that position. He is currently a member of the Tribunal's Executive Deputy Presidents Committee and the Practice and Procedure Committee.

== Honours ==
In the 2010 Australia Day Honours, Groom was appointed an Officer (AO) of the Order of Australia "For service to the Parliament of Tasmania as Premier and through a range of portfolio responsibilities, and to the community through leadership roles within organisations supporting Indigenous, aged and welfare groups".

== Personal life ==
Groom is married to Gillian Crisp and they have four sons and two daughters. One of his sons, Matthew Groom, also served as a member of the Tasmanian parliament until 2018.

Parliament of Australia
Preceded by Ron Davies	Member for Braddon; 1975–1984	Succeeded by Chris Miles
Preceded by Kevin Newman	Minister for Environment, Housing and Community Development; 1977–1978	Succeeded by James Webster
Preceded by Kevin Newman	Minister for Housing and Construction; 1979–1980	Succeeded by Tom McVeigh
Parliament of Tasmania
Preceded by Geoff Pearsall	Deputy Premier of Tasmania; 1988–1989	Succeeded by Peter Patmore
Preceded by Robin Gray	Opposition Leader of Tasmania; 1991–1992	Succeeded by Michael Field
Preceded by Michael Field	Premier of Tasmania; 1992–1996	Succeeded by Tony Rundle
