= Ian Braid =

Australian politician (born 1935)

Ian Maxwell Braid (born 8 July 1935) is an Australian former politician. He was born in Sheffield, Tasmania, and is the cousin of former Tasmanian MLC Harry Braid. In 1969, he was elected to the Tasmanian House of Assembly representing Wilmot for the Liberal Party. He was defeated in 1972, but was re-elected in a countback following Angus Bethune's resignation. He served as a minister from 1982 to 1989 and from 1993 to 1995. He resigned his seat in 1995 and retired from politics.

Braid assisted the state government, when requested in about 2002, by agreeing to become Mayor of Kentish Council, based in Sheffield. The council had been under administration.
