= Robin Gray (Australian politician) =

Australian politician (born 1940)

The Honourable Robin Gray AO
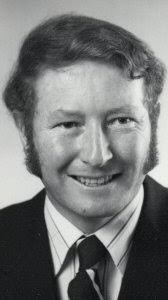

37th Premier of Tasmania
- In office 26 May 1982 – 29 June 1989
- Monarch: Elizabeth II
- Governor: Sir James Plimsoll; Sir Phillip Bennett
- Deputy: Max Bingham; Geoff Pearsall; Ray Groom
- Preceded by: Harry Holgate
- Succeeded by: Michael Field
- Constituency: Wilmot (1976–1984); Lyons (1984–1995)

Leader of the Opposition in Tasmania
- In office 29 June 1989 – 17 December 1991
- In office 10 November 1981 – 26 May 1982

Personal details
- Born: 1 March 1940 (age 86) Kew, Victoria, Australia
- Party: Liberal Party
- Education: University of Melbourne
- Occupation: Agricultural consultant

Robin Trevor Gray AO (born 1 March 1940) is an Australian former politician who was Premier of Tasmania from 1982 to 1989. A Liberal, he was elected Liberal state leader in 1981 and in 1982 defeated the Labor government of Harry Holgate on a policy of "state development," particularly the building of the Franklin Dam, a hydroelectric dam on the Franklin River. He was only the second non-Labor premier to hold the post in 48 years, and the first in 51 years to govern in majority.

== Early life ==
Gray was born in Kew, a suburb of Melbourne. Once he had completed high school, he won a scholarship to Dookie Agricultural College and completed a Bachelor of Agricultural Science at the University of Melbourne. His qualifications led to a job as an agricultural consultant at a firm in Victoria's Western District. In 1965, the firm sent Gray to northern Tasmania to operate a branch of the firm in Launceston.

== Political career ==
During 1976, the state leader of the Liberal Party, Max Bingham, convinced Gray to stand as a candidate in the state election for that year. Gray ended up out-polling three sitting Liberal members in Wilmot. Bingham resigned as leader following his party's poor performance at the 1979 election, which resulted in a marked swing away from the Liberals. Gray was elected Deputy Leader under Geoff Pearsall, and when Pearsall resigned in 1981 for unexplained personal reasons, Gray took over the party's leadership.

The campaign on which Gray embarked, to build the Franklin Dam, aroused protests from environmentalists, led by Dr Bob Brown (later a Senator). Gray in 1982 allied with militant left wing FEDFA trade union leader Kelvin McCoy to form in November 1982 the Organisation for Tasmanian Development (OTD) which was directly associated with notable stickers seen on cars in Tasmania like Doze in a Greenie: help Fertilize the South-West, If It's Brown, Flush It, and Keep Warm This Winter:Burn a Greenie. Gray and McCoy praised each other publicly in their promotion of the Gordon-below-Franklin dam. One of the more notable events of Gray's involvement with the OTD was the 3,000-strong rally in Queenstown on 11 December 1982, which included former Premier Eric Reece. Despite Reece's ALP background, Gray praised Reece as "the greatest living Tasmanian."

In 1983, the newly elected federal Labor government led by Bob Hawke intervened to prevent the building of the dam. However it was finally a High Court of Australia decision (Commonwealth v Tasmania)—despite the persistent clamour for states' rights in which even Joh Bjelke-Petersen was utilised—which stopped the dam's construction. Tasmania was the recipient of $276 million in grants by way of compensation.

Gray was elected to a second term in 1986. This marked the first time in 58 years that a non-Labor government had managed to win a second term in Tasmania.

In 1989, Gray became the centre of the debate over gay rights in Tasmania. Gray stated that homosexuals were not welcome in Tasmania.

But after seven years in power, Gray's Liberals suffered a two-seat swing at the 1989 election, which left them one seat short of a majority, although they were still the largest single group in parliament. The ALP formed an accord with the Greens, whose unprecedented five seats gave them the balance of power. Gray refused to resign and asked the Governor, Sir Phillip Bennett, to call fresh elections. Bennett refused to accept his advice, believing that Gray had lost the support of the House and was no longer in a position to ask for a dissolution. Gray resigned after the House amended the Address-In-Reply to include a statement of no confidence in him or his government and confidence in ALP leader Michael Field. Field then became the new Premier.

A Royal Commission later found that Edmund Rouse, a prominent Launceston businessman and chairman of the forestry company Gunns Limited, had tried to bribe a Labor backbencher to cross the floor and keep Gray in power. Gray denied any knowledge of this but an ALP appointed Royal Commission criticised his conduct (having an unexplained $10,000 in the freezer was a problem), but found no legal case to answer. He resigned as Liberal leader on 17 December 1991. Post the Royal Commission conclusion, in 1992 Gray won one of the highest personal votes ever recorded at the next State election.

== Life after politics ==
From 1996 until his retirement on 5 May 2010, Gray was a director of Gunns. His son, Ben Gray, was a co-founder of private equity firm BGH Capital. In 2020, he published a book "Proud to be Tasmanian" (co-authored with his former chief of staff Andrew Tilt). In the book he attacked then party president (and subsequently Senator) Eric Abetz for moving to get rid of him as party leader. Gray was appointed an Officer of the Order of Australia in the 2024 Australia Day Honours for "distinguished service to the people and Parliament of Tasmania, and to the community".

== Notes ==
Political offices
Preceded by Geoff Pearsall	Leader of the Opposition in Tasmania; 1981–1982	Succeeded by Ken Wriedt
Preceded by Harry Holgate	Premier of Tasmania; 1982–1989	Succeeded by Michael Field
Preceded by Michael Field	Leader of the Opposition in Tasmania; 1989–1991	Succeeded by Ray Groom
Party political offices
Preceded by Geoff Pearsall	Leader of the Liberal Party in Tasmania; 1981–1991	Succeeded by Ray Groom
