= Michael Polley =

Australian politician

The Honourable Michael Polley AM

Speaker of the Tasmanian House of Assembly
- In office 28 June 1989 – 13 April 1992
- Preceded by: Tony Rundle
- Succeeded by: Graeme Page
- In office 6 October 1998 – 15 March 2014
- Preceded by: Frank Madill
- Succeeded by: Elise Archer

Member of the Tasmanian House of Assembly for Wilmot/Lyons
- In office 22 April 1972 – 15 March 2014

Personal details
- Born: Michael Robert Polley; 4 November 1949 (age 76) Westbury, Tasmania, Australia
- Party: Labor Party
- Spouse: Kim Polley (née Chisholm)
- Relations: Helen Polley (sister)

Michael Robert Polley AM (born 4 November 1949 in Westbury, Tasmania) is a Labor Party politician and former member of the Tasmanian House of Assembly in the Division of Lyons. He was first elected in 1972 at the age of 22. Polley remains the longest-serving politician in Tasmanian history.

He was the youngest Cabinet Minister in Tasmanian history, appointed at the age of 27 in the government of premier Doug Lowe. His wife Kim Polley is Mayor of Northern Midlands Council, on which his son Tim also serves. His sister Helen Polley is a member of the Australian Senate.

In 1989 during the Field government he was made the speaker of the Tasmanian House of Assembly. He became speaker again in 1998 when Labor won government. He was minister for national parks 1976–1981.

In the Tasmanian state election 2006, Polley received the highest primary vote in Lyons.

Polley announced in June 2013 that he would retire at the 2014 Tasmanian state election.

In September 2014 Polley announced he would stand as councillor for the Northern Midlands Council in the 2014 Tasmanian Local Government Elections.

He is married with two sons and one daughter.

Parliament of Tasmania
| Preceded by Tony Rundle | Speaker of the Tasmanian House of Assembly; 1989–1992 | Succeeded by Graeme Page |
| Preceded by Frank Madill | Speaker of the Tasmanian House of Assembly; 1998–2014 | Succeeded by Elise Archer |
