= Tony Rundle =

Australian politician (1939–2025)

The Honourable Tony Rundle AO

40th Premier of Tasmania
- In office 18 March 1996 – 14 September 1998
- Monarch: Elizabeth II
- Governor: Sir Guy Green
- Deputy: Sue Napier
- Preceded by: Ray Groom
- Succeeded by: Jim Bacon
- Constituency: Braddon

Personal details
- Born: 5 March 1939 Scottsdale, Tasmania, Australia
- Died: 4 April 2025 (aged 86) Hobart, Tasmania, Australia
- Party: Liberal
- Spouse: Caroline Watt
- Children: 2

Anthony Maxwell Rundle AO (5 March 1939 – 4 April 2025) was an Australian politician who served as Premier of Tasmania from March 1996 until September 1998. He succeeded Ray Groom and was succeeded himself by Jim Bacon. He was a Liberal who held the seat of Braddon between 1986 and 2002. A former journalist, he was married to Caroline Watt. He had twin daughters from his first marriage.

Rundle was first elected as member for Braddon in 1986 and re-elected in the 1989, 1992, 1996 and 1998 elections. He served as Speaker of the Tasmanian House of Assembly from 1988 to 1989.

During the 1996 election, Liberal premier Ray Groom promised he would only govern if the Liberals kept their majority. At that election, the Liberals suffered a three-seat swing and lost their majority. The Labor Party refused to enter into any agreement with the Greens, leaving a Liberal minority government backed by the Greens as the only realistic option. Groom resigned rather than break his pre-election pledge, and Rundle was elected Liberal leader. He quickly reached an agreement with the Greens, allowing him to become Premier.

== Government ==
During Rundle's minority government; unemployment rose and the state economy struggled. The Labor party exploited this in hopes of discrediting the Liberals' economic credibility. However, others simply blamed the bad economic conditions on lack of investment in the state for fear of minority government. In his government, Rundle granted the Greens offices, staff and more parliamentary resources.

Rundle came under pressure from lobby groups to reduce the size of parliament, mostly for cost-cutting purposes. There were numerous proposals including having three multi-member seats in the Tasmanian House of Assembly electing nine members each. Others proposed abolishing the Tasmanian Legislative Council and merging some of its electorates into the House of Assembly. The Labor Party proposed a 40-member parliament with 25 members in the House of Assembly and 15 members in the Legislative Council. The Labor Party proposal was backed by many business groups and the Legislative Council as it would reduce the chance of a minority government. Rundle, however, refused to support Labor's proposal, as it was likely to lead to his downfall. One Liberal member, Bob Cheek, crossed the floor to support Labor's proposal; he was later forced to resign from his position as secretary for small business. The Rundle government was unable to get support from the Legislative Council for its alternatives and wasn't able to abandon the issue, so Rundle later decided to support Labor's bill. In a speech, Rundle stated, "While this new model isn't perfect, at least a party with 10% of the vote will no longer control the state". The reduction in the size of parliament increased the required quota for election from 12.5% to 16.7% and made it more difficult for Green members to be elected. Rundle called an election immediately after declaring support for the move, knowing that the Greens would launch a no-confidence vote against him. Tasmanian Greens leader Christine Milne claimed Rundle had 'betrayed her trust to deliberately remove a group of Tasmanians from politics for the Liberals' own gain'.

After the size of parliament was reduced, Rundle lost the following 1998 state election and became the opposition leader. He held this position until July 1999 and retired just before the 2002 state election.

The Rundle government is credited with its numerous reforms; reforming gun laws, the Basslink initiative, signing the Regional Forests Agreement, decriminalising homosexual activities, making an apology to the Stolen Generations and the handling of the Port Arthur massacre.

== Death ==
Rundle died in Hobart on 4 April 2025, at the age of 86.

Political offices
Preceded by Ray Groom	Premier of Tasmania; 1996–1998	Succeeded by Jim Bacon
Preceded by Jim Bacon	Opposition Leader of Tasmania; 1998–1999	Succeeded by Sue Napier
