= John Charlton Rudge =

Australian politician

John the Duke of Avram (born John Charlton Rudge) (born 12 March 1944) is the titular head of the Grand Duchy of Avram, an Australian micronation. He also served one term in the Tasmanian House of Assembly, representing the Liberal Party in the seat of Lyons. His adopted title is His Grace the Most Noble the Duke of Avram, and his legal name is "John the Duke of Avram".

Rudge obtained a doctorate in business administration in 1981, with a thesis on how to set up a central bank.

Rudge was elected to the Tasmanian House of Assembly in 1989 and served until his defeat in 1992. During that time he served as Shadow Minister for Construction. Rudge's parliamentary profile lists his adopted title as his surname.

He served as Deputy Mayor of Sorell Council in the second half of the 1990s, and again ran for election to the Council unsuccessfully in 2012, listed as John, the Duke of Avram, on the ballot.

In May 2018, Rudge contested the new seat of Prosser at the periodic elections that year.
