= Gill James =

Australian politician (1934–2025)

The Honourable Gill James AM

Member of the Tasmanian House of Assembly for Bass
- In office 11 December 1976 – 8 February 1986
- In office 1 February 1992 – 20 July 2002

Personal details
- Born: 6 December 1934 Launceston, Tasmania, Australia
- Died: 28 May 2025 (aged 90)
- Party: Labor Party

Gillian Hilma James AM (6 December 1934 – 28 May 2025) was an Australian politician. She was born in Launceston, Tasmania. James was first elected to the Tasmanian Parliament in 1976, when she won a seat in Bass for the Labor Party. She held the seat until she was defeated in 1986, but she returned in 1992 and served until her retirement in 2002. James was the first female cabinet minister in Tasmanian history.

In 2005 James was inducted to the Tasmanian Honour Roll of Women for service to the community.

James died on 28 May 2025, at the age of 90.
