= Bob Cheek =

Australian politician (born 1944)

Leader of the Opposition
- In office 20 August 2001 – 20 July 2002
- Preceded by: Sue Napier
- Succeeded by: Rene Hidding

Member of the Tasmanian House of Assembly for Denison
- In office 24 February 1996 – 20 July 2002

Personal details
- Born: Robert Reginald Cheek; 13 May 1944 (age 81) Launceston, Tasmania, Australia
- Party: Liberal Party
- Occupation: Journalist

Robert Reginald Cheek (born 13 May 1944 in Launceston, Tasmania) was leader of the Opposition Tasmanian Liberal Party from 20 August 2001 until he lost his seat in the July 2002 election. It was the first time that a major party leader was unsuccessful in a Tasmanian election since 1903.

Cheek was first elected to Tasmanian parliament at the 1996 election in the Denison electorate. Prior to entering politics he managed a number of business interests and worked as a journalist for The Mercury as well as editing The Sunday Tasmanian.

Cheek first challenged for Liberal leadership in 1999 running against Sue Napier, he failed to win support and lost 9–2. In 2001, Cheek challenged Napier for the leadership, her support was divided amongst party members and she eventually decided to step aside in favour of him. Rene Hidding became leader after his electoral defeat.

He married Stephanie Spencer and had three children.

Prior to becoming a politician, Cheek played Australian rules football in Tasmania for Clarence.

Cheek founded and managed a successful 24-hour gym chain, Zap Fitness, which expanded to 37 clubs in Tasmania, Victoria, and South Australia. In December 2017, Cheek agreed to sell the chain to the Fitness and Lifestyle Group for over $50 million.

== Bibliography ==
- Tasmanian Liberal Party biography
- "Cheek, Bob". Members of the Parliament of Tasmania.

Political offices
Preceded by Sue Napier	Opposition Leader of Tasmania; 2001–2002	Succeeded by Rene Hidding
Party political offices
Preceded by Sue Napier	Leader of the Liberal Party in Tasmania; 2001–2002	Succeeded by Rene Hidding
