= Division of Lyons (state) =

Tasmanian state electoral division

Coordinates: 42.0820°S 147.0730°E

Lyons Tasmania—House of Assembly
- Interactive map of boundaries since the 2021 state election
- State: Tasmania
- Created: 1984
- MP: Guy Barnett (Liberal); Jen Butler (Labor); Carlo Di Falco (Shooters); Mark Shelton (Liberal); Brian Mitchell (Labor); Tabatha Badger (Greens); Jane Howlett (Liberal)
- Party: Labor (2), Liberal (3), Greens (1), Shooters, Fisher and Farmers (1)
- Namesake: Joseph Lyons and Enid Lyons
- Electors: 79,271 (2018)
- Area: 33,212 km^{2} (12,823.2 sq mi)
- Demographic: Mixed
- Federal electorate: Lyons
- State electorate(s): Derwent; Launceston; McIntyre; Montgomery; Prosser; Rumney
Electorates around Lyons:
Braddon	Bass	Tasman Sea
Braddon	Lyons	Tasman Sea
Braddon	Franklin	Clark; Tasman Sea

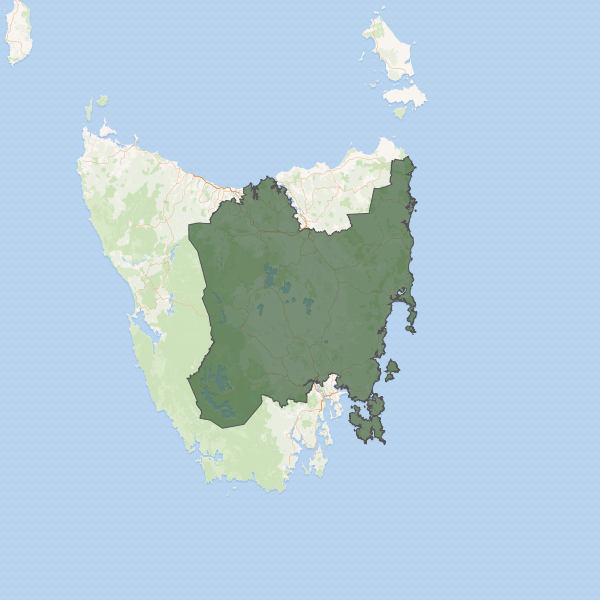
Division of Lyons before the 2021 state election

The electoral division of Lyons (/ˈlaɪənz/) is one of the five electorates in the Tasmanian House of Assembly, with the largest electorate and covering most of central and eastern Tasmania. Lyons is named jointly in honour of Joseph Lyons, Prime Minister of Australia (1932–1939); Premier of Tasmania (1923–1928), and Joseph's wife, Dame Enid Lyons, the first woman elected to the Australian House of Representatives in 1943. The electorate shares its name and boundaries with the federal division of Lyons.

Lyons and the other House of Assembly electoral divisions are each represented by seven members elected under the Hare-Clark electoral system.

== History and electoral profile ==
Before 1984, it was known as the Division of Wilmot. In 1984, it was renamed to jointly honour Joseph Lyons, and his wife, Dame Enid Lyons, the first woman elected to the Australian House of Representatives in 1943 and subsequently the first female member of Cabinet (1949–1951). Joseph Lyons represented the area for over 30 years at the state (1909–1929) and federal (1929–1939) levels.

Lyons is the largest electorate in Tasmania measuring 33,212 km^{2}, it includes the far northern suburbs of Hobart and the towns of St. Helens, Swansea, Bicheno, Campbell Town, Longford, Evandale and Bothwell.

== Representation ==
=== Distribution of seats ===
As 6-member seat:
Election	Seats won
1909–1912	
1912–1913	
1913–1916	
1916–1919	
1919–1922	
1922–1925	
1925–1928	
1928–1931	
1931–1934	
1934–1937	
1937–1941	
1941–1946	
1946–1948	
1948–1950	
1950–1955	
1955–1956	
1956–1959	

As 7-member seat:
Election	Seats won
1959–1964	
1964–1969	
1969–1972	
1972–1976	
1976–1979	
1979–1982	
1982–1986	
1986–1989	
1989–1992	
1992–1996	
1996–1998	

As 5-member seat:
Election	Seats won
1998–2002	
2002–2006	
2006–2010	
2010–2014	
2014–2018	
2018–2021	
2021–2024	

As 7-member seat:
Election	Seats won
2024–2025	
2025–	

Legend:
Labor
Liberal
Nationalist
Liberal
Anti-Socialist
Country
Liberal (Lee)
Greens
Independent
Jacqui Lambie Network
Shooters, Fishers and Farmers

=== Members for Lyons and Wilmot ===
Year	Member	Party	Member	Party	Member	Party	Member	Party	Member	Party	Member	Party	Member	Party
1909	6 seats (1909–1959)		Joseph Lyons	Labor	Richard Field	Anti-Socialist	Jonathan Best	Anti-Socialist	John Hope	Anti-Socialist	Jens Jensen	Labor	(Sir) Walter Lee	Anti-Socialist
1910	6 seats (1909–1959)		Joseph Lyons	Labor	Richard Field	Anti-Socialist	Jonathan Best	Anti-Socialist	John Hope	Anti-Socialist	Edward Mulcahy	Anti-Socialist	(Sir) Walter Lee	Anti-Socialist
1911	6 seats (1909–1959)		Joseph Lyons	Labor	Richard Field	Anti-Socialist	Jonathan Best	Anti-Socialist	Herbert Hays	Anti-Socialist	Edward Mulcahy	Anti-Socialist	(Sir) Walter Lee	Anti-Socialist
1912	6 seats (1909–1959)		Joseph Lyons	Labor	Michael O'Keefe	Labor	Norman Cameron	Liberal	Herbert Hays	Liberal	Edward Mulcahy	Liberal	(Sir) Walter Lee	Liberal
1913	6 seats (1909–1959)		Joseph Lyons	Labor	Michael O'Keefe	Labor	Jonathan Best	Liberal	Herbert Hays	Liberal	Edward Mulcahy	Liberal	(Sir) Walter Lee	Liberal
1913	6 seats (1909–1959)		Joseph Lyons	Labor	Michael O'Keefe	Labor	Ernest Blyth	Liberal	Herbert Hays	Liberal	Edward Mulcahy	Liberal	(Sir) Walter Lee	Liberal
1916	6 seats (1909–1959)		Joseph Lyons	Labor	Michael O'Keefe	Labor	Ernest Blyth	Liberal	Herbert Hays	Liberal	Edward Mulcahy	Liberal	(Sir) Walter Lee	Liberal
1917	6 seats (1909–1959)		Joseph Lyons	Labor	Michael O'Keefe	Labor	Ernest Blyth	Nationalist	Herbert Hays	Nationalist	Edward Mulcahy	Nationalist	(Sir) Walter Lee	Nationalist
1919	6 seats (1909–1959)		Joseph Lyons	Labor	Michael O'Keefe	Labor	Ernest Blyth	Nationalist	Herbert Hays	Nationalist	William Connell	Nationalist	(Sir) Walter Lee	Nationalist
1919	6 seats (1909–1959)		Joseph Lyons	Labor	Michael O'Keefe	Labor	Ernest Blyth	Nationalist	Herbert Hays	Nationalist	George Pullen	Nationalist	(Sir) Walter Lee	Nationalist
1922	6 seats (1909–1959)		Joseph Lyons	Labor	Michael O'Keefe	Labor	Ernest Blyth	Country	Albert Bendall	Country	Neil Campbell	Nationalist	(Sir) Walter Lee	Liberal
1925	6 seats (1909–1959)		Joseph Lyons	Labor	Michael O'Keefe	Labor	Ernest Blyth	Nationalist	Albert Bendall	Nationalist	Neil Campbell	Nationalist	(Sir) Walter Lee	Nationalist
1925	6 seats (1909–1959)		Joseph Lyons	Labor	Michael O'Keefe	Labor	William Shoobridge	Labor	Norman Cameron	Independent	Neil Campbell	Nationalist	(Sir) Walter Lee	Nationalist
1926	6 seats (1909–1959)		Joseph Lyons	Labor	John Palamountain	Labor	William Shoobridge	Labor	Norman Cameron	Independent	Neil Campbell	Nationalist	(Sir) Walter Lee	Nationalist
1928	6 seats (1909–1959)		Joseph Lyons	Labor	Jens Jensen	Labor	Eric Ogilvie	Labor	Percy Best	Nationalist	Neil Campbell	Nationalist	(Sir) Walter Lee	Nationalist
1929	6 seats (1909–1959)		William Shoobridge	Labor	Jens Jensen	Labor	Eric Ogilvie	Labor	Percy Best	Nationalist	Neil Campbell	Nationalist	(Sir) Walter Lee	Nationalist
1931	6 seats (1909–1959)		Alfred Burbury	Nationalist	Jens Jensen	Labor	Eric Ogilvie	Labor	Llewellyn Atkinson	Nationalist	Neil Campbell	Nationalist	(Sir) Walter Lee	Nationalist
1934	6 seats (1909–1959)		George Becker	Independent	David O'Keefe	Labor	Eric Ogilvie	Labor	Donald Cameron	Nationalist	Neil Campbell	Nationalist	(Sir) Walter Lee	Nationalist
1937	6 seats (1909–1959)		George Becker	Labor	David O'Keefe	Labor	Eric Ogilvie	Labor	Francis Foster	Nationalist	Neil Campbell	Nationalist	(Sir) Walter Lee	Nationalist
1940	6 seats (1909–1959)		George Becker	Labor	David O'Keefe	Labor	William Taylor	Labor	Francis Foster	Nationalist	Neil Campbell	Nationalist	(Sir) Walter Lee	Nationalist
1941	6 seats (1909–1959)		Lancelot Spurr	Labor	David O'Keefe	Labor	William Taylor	Labor	Francis Foster	Nationalist	Neil Campbell	Nationalist	(Sir) Walter Lee	Nationalist
1941	6 seats (1909–1959)		Lancelot Spurr	Labor	David O'Keefe	Labor	William Taylor	Labor	Ernest West	Labor	Neil Campbell	Nationalist	(Sir) Walter Lee	Nationalist
1943	6 seats (1909–1959)		Lancelot Spurr	Labor	Peter Pike	Labor	William Taylor	Labor	Ernest West	Labor	Neil Campbell	Nationalist	(Sir) Walter Lee	Nationalist
1946	6 seats (1909–1959)		Lancelot Spurr	Labor	Peter Pike	Labor	Roy Fagan	Labor	Robert Robertson	Liberal	Neil Campbell	Liberal	Angus Bethune	Liberal
1948	6 seats (1909–1959)		Lancelot Spurr	Labor	Peter Pike	Labor	Roy Fagan	Labor	Robert Robertson	Liberal	Neil Campbell	Liberal	Angus Bethune	Liberal
1949	6 seats (1909–1959)		Lancelot Spurr	Labor	Douglas Cashion	Labor	Roy Fagan	Labor	Robert Robertson	Liberal	Neil Campbell	Liberal	Angus Bethune	Liberal
1950	6 seats (1909–1959)		Lancelot Spurr	Labor	Douglas Cashion	Labor	Roy Fagan	Labor	Charles Best	Liberal	Neil Campbell	Liberal	Angus Bethune	Liberal
1955	6 seats (1909–1959)		Lancelot Spurr	Labor	Douglas Cashion	Labor	Roy Fagan	Labor	Charles Best	Liberal	Amelia Best	Liberal	Angus Bethune	Liberal
1956	6 seats (1909–1959)		Reg Fisher	Labor	Douglas Cashion	Labor	Roy Fagan	Labor	Charles Best	Liberal	Bert Bessell	Liberal	Angus Bethune	Liberal
1958	6 seats (1909–1959)		Reg Fisher	Labor	Douglas Cashion	Labor	Roy Fagan	Labor	Amelia Best	Liberal	Bert Bessell	Liberal	Angus Bethune	Liberal
1959	6 seats (1909–1959)		William McNeil	Labor	Douglas Cashion	Labor	Roy Fagan	Labor	Amelia Best	Liberal	Bert Bessell	Liberal	Angus Bethune	Liberal
1959	Thomas McDonald	Labor	William McNeil	Labor	Douglas Cashion	Labor	Roy Fagan	Labor	Bob Ingamells	Liberal	Bert Bessell	Liberal	Angus Bethune	Liberal
1964	Thomas McDonald	Labor	William Anderson	Labor	Douglas Cashion	Labor	Roy Fagan	Labor	Bob Ingamells	Liberal	Bert Bessell	Liberal	Angus Bethune	Liberal
1969	Ian Braid	Liberal	William Anderson	Labor	Douglas Cashion	Labor	Roy Fagan	Labor	Bob Ingamells	Liberal	Bert Bessell	Liberal	Angus Bethune	Liberal
1972	Darrel Baldock	Labor	Andrew Lohrey	Labor	Michael Polley	Labor	Roy Fagan	Labor	Bob Ingamells	Liberal	Bert Bessell	Liberal	Angus Bethune	Liberal
1974	Darrel Baldock	Labor	Andrew Lohrey	Labor	Michael Polley	Labor	Charles Batt	Labor	Bob Ingamells	Liberal	Bert Bessell	Liberal	Angus Bethune	Liberal
1975	Darrel Baldock	Labor	Andrew Lohrey	Labor	Michael Polley	Labor	Charles Batt	Labor	Bob Ingamells	Liberal	Bert Bessell	Liberal	Ian Braid	Liberal
1976	Darrel Baldock	Labor	Andrew Lohrey	Labor	Michael Polley	Labor	Terry Aulich	Labor	Robin Gray	Liberal	Graeme Page	Liberal	Ian Braid	Liberal
1979	Darrel Baldock	Labor	Andrew Lohrey	Labor	Michael Polley	Labor	Terry Aulich	Labor	Robin Gray	Liberal	Graeme Page	Liberal	Ian Braid	Liberal
1982	Darrel Baldock	Labor	Andrew Lohrey	Labor	Michael Polley	Labor	Stephen Salter	Liberal	Robin Gray	Liberal	Graeme Page	Liberal	Ian Braid	Liberal
1986	Darrel Baldock	Labor	David Llewellyn	Labor	Michael Polley	Labor	Bob Mainwaring	Liberal	Robin Gray	Liberal	Graeme Page	Liberal	Ian Braid	Liberal
1987	Chris Batt	Labor	David Llewellyn	Labor	Michael Polley	Labor	Bob Mainwaring	Liberal	Robin Gray	Liberal	Graeme Page	Liberal	Ian Braid	Liberal
1989	Christine Milne	Greens	David Llewellyn	Labor	Michael Polley	Labor	The Duke of Avram	Liberal	Robin Gray	Liberal	Graeme Page	Liberal	Ian Braid	Liberal
1992	Christine Milne	Greens	David Llewellyn	Labor	Michael Polley	Labor	Bob Mainwaring	Liberal	Robin Gray	Liberal	Graeme Page	Liberal	Ian Braid	Liberal
1995	Christine Milne	Greens	David Llewellyn	Labor	Michael Polley	Labor	Bob Mainwaring	Liberal	Denise Swan	Liberal	Graeme Page	Liberal	Ian Braid	Liberal
1996	Christine Milne	Greens	David Llewellyn	Labor	Michael Polley	Labor	Bob Mainwaring	Liberal	Denise Swan	Liberal	Rene Hidding	Liberal	Lara Giddings	Labor
1998	5 seats (1998–2024)		David Llewellyn	Labor	Michael Polley	Labor	Ken Bacon	Labor	Denise Swan	Liberal	Rene Hidding	Liberal	5 seats (1998–2024)	
2002	5 seats (1998–2024)		David Llewellyn	Labor	Michael Polley	Labor	Ken Bacon	Labor	Tim Morris	Greens	Rene Hidding	Liberal	5 seats (1998–2024)	
2005	5 seats (1998–2024)		David Llewellyn	Labor	Michael Polley	Labor	Heather Butler	Labor	Tim Morris	Greens	Rene Hidding	Liberal	5 seats (1998–2024)	
2006	5 seats (1998–2024)		David Llewellyn	Labor	Michael Polley	Labor	Heather Butler	Labor	Tim Morris	Greens	Rene Hidding	Liberal	5 seats (1998–2024)	
2010	5 seats (1998–2024)		Rebecca White	Labor	Michael Polley	Labor	Mark Shelton	Liberal	Tim Morris	Greens	Rene Hidding	Liberal	5 seats (1998–2024)	
2014	5 seats (1998–2024)		Rebecca White	Labor	David Llewellyn	Labor	Mark Shelton	Liberal	Guy Barnett	Liberal	Rene Hidding	Liberal	5 seats (1998–2024)	
2018	5 seats (1998–2024)		Rebecca White	Labor	Jen Butler	Labor	Mark Shelton	Liberal	Guy Barnett	Liberal	Rene Hidding	Liberal	5 seats (1998–2024)	
2019	5 seats (1998–2024)		Rebecca White	Labor	Jen Butler	Labor	Mark Shelton	Liberal	Guy Barnett	Liberal	John Tucker	Liberal	5 seats (1998–2024)	
2021	5 seats (1998–2024)		Rebecca White	Labor	Jen Butler	Labor	Mark Shelton	Liberal	Guy Barnett	Liberal	John Tucker	Liberal	5 seats (1998–2024)	
2023	5 seats (1998–2024)		Rebecca White	Labor	Jen Butler	Labor	Mark Shelton	Liberal	Guy Barnett	Liberal	John Tucker	Independent	5 seats (1998–2024)	
2024	Tabatha Badger	Greens	Rebecca White	Labor	Jen Butler	Labor	Mark Shelton	Liberal	Guy Barnett	Liberal	Jane Howlett	Liberal	Andrew Jenner	Lambie Network
2025	Tabatha Badger	Greens	Casey Farrell	Labor	Jen Butler	Labor	Mark Shelton	Liberal	Guy Barnett	Liberal	Jane Howlett	Liberal	Andrew Jenner	National
2025	Tabatha Badger	Greens	Brian Mitchell	Labor	Jen Butler	Labor	Mark Shelton	Liberal	Guy Barnett	Liberal	Jane Howlett	Liberal	Carlo Di Falco	SFF

== Election results ==

2025 Tasmanian state election: Lyons
Party	Candidate	Votes	%	±%
Quota		9,257		
Liberal	Guy Barnett (elected 1)	9,975	13.3	+2.2
Liberal	Jane Howlett (elected 2)	9,346	12.5	+3.3
Liberal	Mark Shelton (elected 6)	4,698	6.3	−0.7
Liberal	Stephanie Cameron	2,793	3.7	−0.2
Liberal	Richard Hallett	2,129	2.8	+0.3
Liberal	Poppy Lyne	1,544	2.1	+2.1
Liberal	Bree Groves	996	1.3	+1.3
Labor	Jen Butler (elected 4)	6,445	8.6	+5.4
Labor	Brian Mitchell (elected 5)	5,400	7.2	+7.2
Labor	Richard Goss	2,674	3.6	+1.2
Labor	Casey Farrell	2,640	3.5	+1.9
Labor	Sharon Campbell	1,732	2.3	+2.3
Labor	Edwin Batt	1,428	1.9	+0.5
Labor	Saxon O'Donnell	990	1.3	+1.3
Greens	Tabatha Badger (elected 3)	5,507	7.3	+1.8
Greens	Hannah Rubenach-Quinn	1,053	1.4	−0.1
Greens	Alistair Allan	932	1.2	+0.4
Greens	Isabel Shapcott	813	1.1	+1.1
Greens	Craig Brown	776	1.0	+0.0
Greens	Mitch Houghton	563	0.8	+0.1
Greens	Joey Cavanagh	514	0.7	+0.7
Shooters, Fishers, Farmers	Carlo Di Falco (elected 7)	5,050	6.7	+5.9
National	John Tucker	1,608	2.1	−1.0
National	Andrew Jenner	833	1.1	−1.8
National	Lesley Pyecroft	273	0.4	−2.1
National	Rick Mandelson	1,841	0.4	+0.4
National	Francis Haddon-Cave	200	0.3	+0.3
Independent	Angela Offord	941	1.3	+1.0
Independent	Michelle Dracoulis	845	1.1	+1.1
Independent	Jiri Lev	498	0.7	+0.7
Independent	John Hawkins	475	0.6	+0.6
Independent	Phillip Bigg	364	0.5	−0.5
Independent	Ray Broomhall	256	0.3	+0.3
Independent	Tenille Murtagh	193	0.3	+0.3
Independent	Paul Dare	189	0.3	+0.3
Total formal votes		74,936	63.4	+1.0
Informal votes		5,293	6.6	−1.0
Turnout		80,229	89.7	−1.3
Party total votes
Liberal		31,481	42.0	+4.4
Labor		21,309	28.4	-4.3
Greens		10,158	13.6	+2.7
Shooters, Fishers, Farmers		5,050	6.7	+2.0
National		3,177	4.2	+4.2
Independent	Angela Offord	941	1.3	+1.0
Independent	Michelle Dracoulis	845	1.1	+1.1
Independent	Jiri Lev	498	0.7	+0.7
Independent	John Hawkins	475	0.6	+0.6
Independent	Phillip Bigg	364	0.5	−0.5
Independent	Ray Broomhall	256	0.3	+0.3
Independent	Tenille Murtagh	193	0.3	+0.3
Independent	Paul Dare	189	0.3	+0.3
Shooters gain from Lambie Network				

== See also ==
- Tasmanian Legislative Council
