= David Llewellyn (Australian politician) =

Australian politician

The Honourable David Llewellyn AM
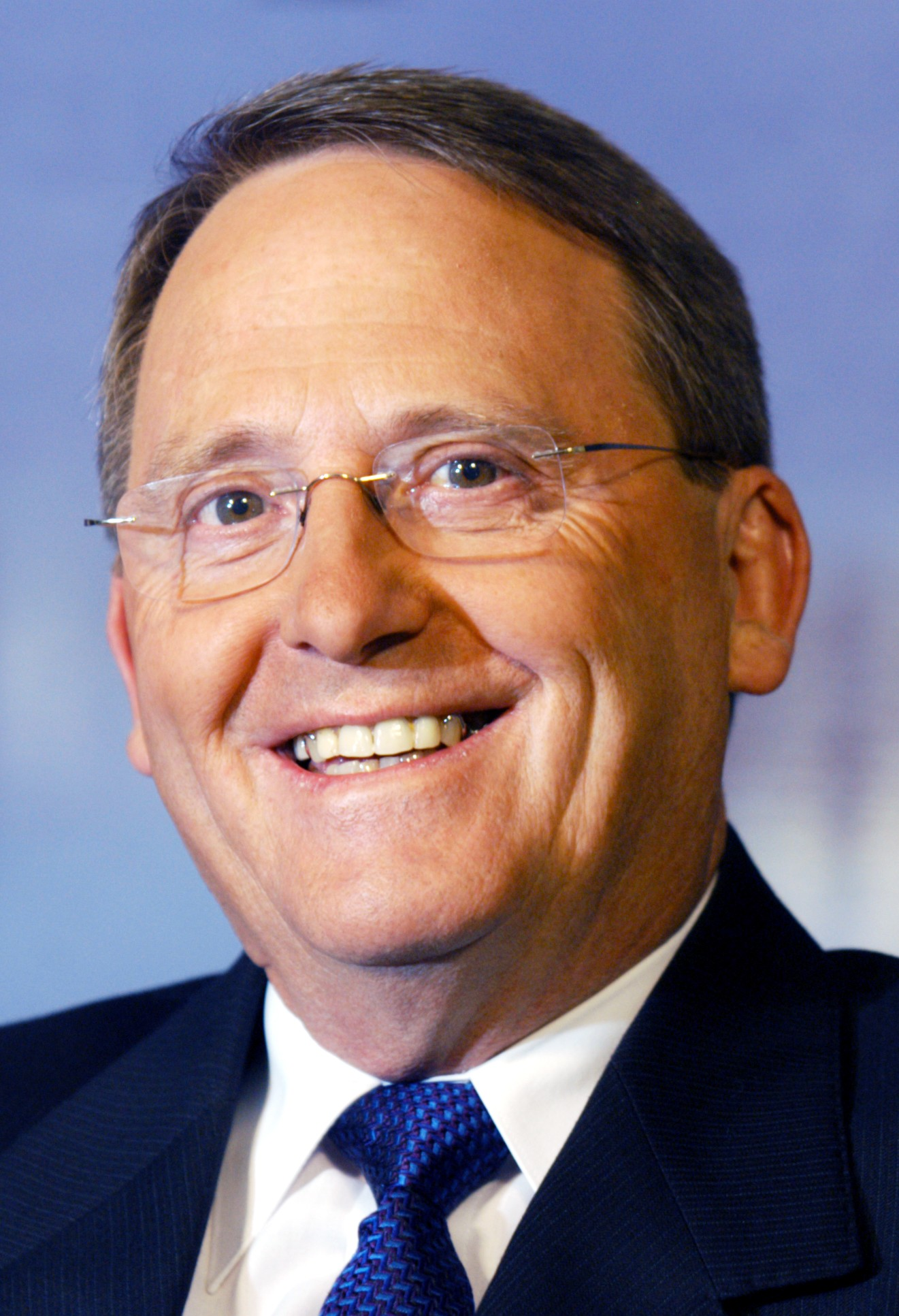

Deputy Premier of Tasmania
- In office 22 March 2004 – 5 April 2006
- Premier: Paul Lennon
- Preceded by: Paul Lennon
- Succeeded by: Bryan Green

Member of the Tasmanian House of Assembly for Lyons
- In office 8 February 1986 – 13 April 2010
- In office 30 March 2014 – 2 March 2018

Personal details
- Born: 16 August 1942 (age 84) St Marys, Tasmania, Australia
- Party: Labor Party

David Edward Llewellyn AM (born 16 August 1942 in St Marys, Tasmania) is an Australian politician, who was a Labor Party member of the Tasmanian House of Assembly from 1986 to 2010 and from 2014 to 2018.

== Political career ==
Llewellyn was elected to the Tasmanian House of Assembly for the seat of Lyons at the 1986 state election which was won by the Liberal Party under Robin Gray. Labor formed a minority government with the support of the Green Independents under the Labor–Green Accord in 1989, and Llewellyn joined Michael Field's inaugural cabinet as Minister for Primary Industry and Forests. Llewellyn would hold the Primary Industries, Water and Energy portfolios on several other occasions, from 1998 to 2002 and 2006 to 2008. From 2002 to 2006, he was Paul Lennon's Deputy Premier.

On 13 May 2011, Llewellyn admitted to ABC Radio that the Labor and Liberal parties conspired in 1998 to reduce the number of MPs from 35 to 25 in an effort to eliminate the Greens.

On 25 June 2012, Llewellyn was preselected to run as a Tasmanian Labor candidate in the 2014 state election, and was subsequently re-elected to the House of Assembly after losing his seat in 2010. He retired at the 2018 election.

== Personal life ==
Llewellyn is married with two sons. He has an interest in genealogy, electronics, and fishing, and plays golf and lawn bowls.

== Community service ==
Llewellyn is Chairman of Derwent Valley Council's Willow Court Conservation Special Committee helping to restore the Royal Derwent Hospital.

Political offices
Preceded by Paul Lennon	Deputy Premier of Tasmania; 2004–2006	Succeeded by Bryan Green
