= Bob Mainwaring =

Australian politician

Robert Geoffrey "Bob" Mainwaring (9 February 1926 – 11 March 2015) was a former Australian politician. He was born in Wynyard, Tasmania. In 1986 he was elected to the Tasmanian House of Assembly representing Lyons for the Liberal Party. In 1986 he was defeated by the Duke of Avram, the head of a tiny micronation who ran a high-profile campaign. He defeated the Duke in 1992 and held his seat until 1998, when the reduction in the size of the House meant he again lost his seat.

He died on 11 March 2015.
