= Graeme Page =

Australian politician (1943–2023)

Graeme Reginald Page (14 February 1943 − 20 September 2023) was an Australian politician. He was born in Launceston, Tasmania. In 1976, he was elected to the Tasmanian House of Assembly representing Wilmot for the Liberal Party. He was Speaker of the House from 1992 to 1996, and lost re-election in 1996.

Page died on 20 September 2023, at the age of 80.
