= Electoral results for the Division of Franklin (state) =

Local elections in Franklin, Tasmania

This is a list of electoral results for the division of Franklin in Tasmanian elections since 1913.

== Election results ==
=== Elections in the 2020s ===
==== 2025 ====

2025 Tasmanian state election: Franklin
Party	Candidate	Votes	%	±%
Quota		9,126		
Liberal	Eric Abetz (elected 2)	9,109	12.5	+3.3
Liberal	Jacquie Petrusma (elected 6)	5,835	8.0	−0.5
Liberal	Nic Street	3,719	5.1	−1.6
Liberal	Dean Young	2,241	3.1	−1.2
Liberal	Josh Garvin	1,611	2.2	+0.9
Liberal	Michele Howlett	1,293	1.8	+1.8
Liberal	Natasha Miller	1,282	1.8	+1.8
Labor	Dean Winter (elected 5)	8,241	11.3	+0.1
Labor	Meg Brown (elected 7)	3,196	4.4	+0.6
Labor	Jess Munday	2,169	3.0	+3.0
Labor	Kaspar Deane	1,416	1.9	−0.6
Labor	Amelia Meyers	687	0.9	+0.9
Labor	Chris Hannan	524	0.7	−1.3
Labor	Traycee di Virgilio	396	0.5	+0.5
Group C	Peter George (elected 1)	11,499	15.8	+15.8
Group C	Kirsten Bacon	231	0.3	+0.3
Group C	Andrew Jenner	191	0.3	+0.3
Group C	Anthony Houston	179	0.2	+0.2
Group C	Louise Cherrie	146	0.2	+0.2
Group C	Rayne Allinson	143	0.2	+0.2
Group C	Chrissie Materia	110	0.2	+0.2
Greens	Rosalie Woodruff (elected 3)	7,124	9.8	−3.9
Greens	Owen Fitzgerald	811	1.1	+0.2
Greens	Carly Allen	600	0.8	+0.8
Greens	Gideon Cordover	384	0.5	−0.6
Greens	Brian Chapman	375	0.5	+0.5
Greens	Mark Donnellon	333	0.5	+0.5
Greens	Adi Munshi	257	0.4	+0.4
Independent	David O'Byrne (elected 4)	8,223	11.3	+2.5
Independent	Hans Jurriaan Willink	352	0.5	+0.5
Independent	Sarah Gibbens	330	0.5	+0.5
Total formal votes		73,007	95.2	+0.6
Informal votes		3,738	4.8	−0.6
Turnout		76,745	91.4	−1.0
Party total votes
Liberal		25,090	34.4	+0.4
Labor		16,629	22.8	−4.5
Group C		12,499	17.1	+17.1
Greens		9,884	13.5	−6.3
Independent	David O'Byrne	8,223	11.3	+2.5
Independent	Hans Jurriaan Willink	352	0.5	+0.5
Independent	Sarah Gibbens	330	0.5	+0.5
Independent gain from Liberal				

==== 2024 ====
2024 Tasmanian state election: Franklin
Party	Candidate	Votes	%	±%
Quota		9,006		
Liberal	Eric Abetz (elected 6)	6,661	9.2	+9.2
Liberal	Jacquie Petrusma (elected 3)	6,093	8.5	−12.6
Liberal	Nic Street (elected 7)	4,811	6.7	−1.7
Liberal	Dean Young	3,078	4.3	−0.3
Liberal	Jock McGregor	1,463	2.0	+2.0
Liberal	Aldo Antolli	1,449	2.0	+2.0
Liberal	Josh Garvin	972	1.3	+1.3
Labor	Dean Winter (elected 2)	8,055	11.2	−0.2
Labor	Meg Brown (elected 4)	3,613	5.0	+5.0
Labor	Toby Thorpe	2,908	4.0	+1.5
Labor	Kaspar Deane	1,808	2.5	+2.5
Labor	Ebony Altimira	1,736	2.4	+2.4
Labor	Simon Bailey	946	1.3	+1.3
Labor	Philip Pregnell	613	0.9	+0.9
Greens	Rosalie Woodruff (elected 1)	9,879	13.7	−1.0
Greens	Jade Darko	1,008	1.4	+1.4
Greens	Christine Campbell	810	1.1	+1.1
Greens	Gideon Cordover	776	1.1	+0.2
Greens	Jenny Cambers-Smith	762	1.1	+1.1
Greens	Owen Fitzgerald	614	0.9	+0.9
Greens	Lukas Mrosek	412	0.6	+0.6
Independent	David O'Byrne (elected 5)	6,312	8.8	−2.1
Lambie	Chris Hannan	1,418	2.0	+2.0
Lambie	Marshall Callaghan	1,063	1.5	+1.5
Lambie	Conor Hallahan	1,025	1.4	+1.4
Independent	Clare Glade-Wright	1,154	1.6	+1.6
Animal Justice	Jehni Thomas-Wurth	1,122	1.6	+1.6
Independent	Tony Mulder	597	0.8	+0.8
Local Network	Martine Delaney	552	0.8	+0.8
Independent	Bob Elliston	186	0.3	+0.3
Independent	Tamar Cordover	144	0.2	+0.2
Total formal votes		72,040	94.6	−1.2
Informal votes		4,115	5.4	+1.2
Turnout		76,155	92.4	+0.1
Party total votes
Liberal		24,527	34.0	−8.2
Labor		19,679	27.3	−5.9
Greens		14,261	19.8	+0.8
Independent	David O'Byrne	6,312	8.8	−2.1
Lambie		3,506	4.9	+4.9
Independent	Clare Glade-Wright	1,154	1.6	+1.6
Animal Justice		1,122	1.6	−0.2
Independent	Tony Mulder	597	0.8	+0.8
Local Network		552	0.8	+0.8
Independent	Bob Elliston	186	0.4	+0.4
Independent	Tamar Cordover	144	0.2	+0.2

==== 2021 ====
2021 Tasmanian state election: Franklin
Party	Candidate	Votes	%	±%
Quota		11,544		
Liberal	Jacquie Petrusma (elected 1)	14,550	21.0	+16.1
Liberal	Nic Street (elected 5)	5,783	8.3	+5.7
Liberal	Bec Enders	3,271	4.7	+4.7
Liberal	Dean Young	3,196	4.6	+4.6
Liberal	James Walker	2,468	3.6	+3.6
Labor	Dean Winter (elected 3)	7,859	11.3	+11.3
Labor	David O'Byrne (elected 4)	7,538	10.9	−4.9
Labor	Alison Standen	3,107	4.5	−2.7
Labor	Amy Brumby	2,020	2.9	+2.9
Labor	Toby Thorpe	1,753	2.5	+2.5
Labor	Fabiano Cangelosi	724	1.0	+1.0
Greens	Rosalie Woodruff (elected 2)	10,161	14.7	+4.4
Greens	Bridget Verrier	939	1.4	+1.4
Greens	Phoenix Harrison	745	1.1	+1.1
Greens	Kit Darko	671	1.0	+1.0
Greens	Gideon Cordover	606	0.9	+0.9
Shooters, Fishers, Farmers	Shane Broadby	788	1.1	+1.1
Shooters, Fishers, Farmers	Rebecca Byfield	627	0.9	+0.9
Shooters, Fishers, Farmers	Robert Cairns	594	0.9	+0.9
Animal Justice	Mark Tanner	1,227	1.8	+1.8
Independent	Francis Flannery	379	0.5	+0.5
Independent	George Spiliopoulos	252	0.4	+0.4
Total formal votes		69,258	95.8	−0.2
Informal votes		3,031	4.2	+0.2
Turnout		72,289	92.5	−1.0
Party total votes
Liberal		29,268	42.3	−6.1
Labor		23,001	33.2	−1.2
Greens		13,122	18.9	+4.6
Shooters, Fishers, Farmers		2,009	2.9	+2.9
Animal Justice		1,227	1.8	+1.8
Independent	Francis Flannery	379	0.5	+0.5
Independent	George Spiliopoulos	252	0.4	+0.4
Liberal hold		Swing	+16.1	
Liberal hold		Swing	+5.7	
Labor hold		Swing	+11.3	
Labor hold		Swing	–4.9	
Greens hold		Swing	+4.4	

=== Elections in the 2010s ===
==== 2018 ====
2018 Tasmanian state election: Franklin
Party	Candidate	Votes	%	±%
Quota		11,863		
Liberal	Will Hodgman (elected 1)	27,184	38.2	+3.0
Liberal	Jacquie Petrusma (elected 2)	3,467	4.9	−1.8
Liberal	Nic Street	1,907	2.7	+1.0
Liberal	Claire Chandler	1,151	1.6	+1.6
Liberal	Simon Duffy	739	1.0	+1.0
Labor	David O'Byrne (elected 3)	11,221	16.4	+1.3
Labor	Alison Standen (elected 4)	5,087	7.1	+7.1
Labor	Kevin Midson	4,107	5.8	+5.8
Labor	Heather Chong	2,136	3.0	+1.9
Labor	Kathryn Barnsley	1,913	2.7	+2.7
Greens	Rosalie Woodruff (elected 5)	7,284	10.2	+8.6
Greens	Holly Ewin	909	1.3	+1.3
Greens	Richard Atkinson	896	1.3	+0.8
Greens	Ross Lincolne	595	0.8	+0.8
Greens	Lachlan Hatfield	536	0.8	+0.8
Shooters, Fishers, Farmers	Brendon Hext	2,041	2.9	+2.9
Total formal votes		71,173	94.9	−1.1
Informal votes		2,988	4.0	+0.0
Turnout		74,161	96.0	−0.0
Party total votes
Liberal		34,448	48.4	−1.4
Labor		24,464	34.4	+5.8
Greens		10,220	14.4	−2.4
Shooters, Fishers, Farmers		2.041	2.9	+2.9
Liberal hold		Swing	+3.0	
Liberal hold		Swing	–1.8	
Labor hold		Swing	+1.3	
Labor gain from Liberal		Swing	+7.1	
Greens hold		Swing	+8.6	

==== 2014 ====
2014 Tasmanian state election: Franklin
Party	Candidate	Votes	%	±%
Quota		11,184		
Liberal	Will Hodgman (elected 1)	23,589	35.2	+3.5
Liberal	Jacquie Petrusma (elected 2)	4,463	6.7	+2.8
Liberal	Paul Harriss (elected 5)	3,646	5.4	+5.4
Liberal	Nic Street	1,122	1.7	+1.7
Liberal	Sue Bastone	623	0.9	+0.9
Labor	Lara Giddings (elected 3)	11,035	16.4	+1.3
Labor	David O'Byrne	5,620	8.4	+0.8
Labor	Julie Dick	1,372	2.0	+2.0
Labor	Heather Chong	760	1.1	+1.1
Labor	Russell Mitchell	413	0.6	+0.6
Greens	Nick McKim (elected 4)	9,013	13.4	−10.7
Greens	Rosalie Woodruff	1,110	1.7	+1.7
Greens	Simon Burnett	454	0.7	+0.7
Greens	Zoe Kean	354	0.5	+0.5
Greens	Richard Atkinson	334	0.5	+0.5
Palmer United	Debra Thurley	743	1.1	+1.1
Palmer United	John Peers	631	0.9	+0.9
Palmer United	Michael Figg	413	0.6	+0.6
Palmer United	Con Spiliopoulous	391	0.6	+0.6
Palmer United	Luke Rutherford	320	0.5	+0.5
Socialist Alliance	Jenny Forward	364	0.5	+0.1
National	Matt Holloway	174	0.3	+0.3
National	Penny Lane	97	0.1	+0.1
National	Myrtle Wakeling	62	0.1	0.1
Total formal votes		67,103	96.0	+0.2
Informal votes		2,790	4.0	−0.2
Turnout		69,893	94.2	−0.5
Party total votes
Liberal		33,443	49.8	+8.6
Labor		19,200	28.6	−1.9
Greens		11,265	16.8	−10.6
Palmer United		2,498	3.7	+3.7
Socialist Alliance		364	0.5	+0.1
National		333	0.5	+0.5
Liberal hold		Swing	+3.5	
Liberal hold		Swing	+2.8	
Liberal gain from Labor		Swing	+5.4	
Labor hold		Swing	+1.3	
Greens hold		Swing	−10.7	

==== 2010 ====
2010 Tasmanian state election: Franklin
Party	Candidate	Votes	%	±%
Quota		10,675		
Liberal	Will Hodgman (elected 1)	20,302	31.7	+9.7
Liberal	Jacquie Petrusma (elected 5)	2,500	3.9	+3.9
Liberal	Tony Mulder	2,106	3.3	+3.3
Liberal	Jillian Law	884	1.4	+1.4
Liberal	David Compton	576	0.9	+0.9
Labor	Lara Giddings (elected 3)	9,648	15.1	+4.6
Labor	David O'Byrne (elected 4)	4,846	7.6	+7.6
Labor	Daniel Hulme	2,214	3.5	+2.5
Labor	Ross Butler	1,854	2.9	+1.2
Labor	Kate Churchill	964	1.5	+1.5
Greens	Nick McKim (elected 2)	15,462	24.1	+8.2
Greens	Wendy Heatley	621	1.0	+1.0
Greens	Adam Burling	495	0.8	+0.8
Greens	Deborah Brewer	478	0.7	+0.7
Greens	Mark Harrison	459	0.7	+0.7
Independent	John Forster	355	0.6	+0.6
Socialist Alliance	Jenny Forward	281	0.4	+0.4
Total formal votes		64,045	96.2	+0.1
Informal votes		2,548	3.8	−0.1
Turnout		66,593	94.7	−0.5
Party total votes
Liberal		26,368	41.2	+9.2
Labor		19,526	30.5	−15.6
Greens		17,515	27.3	+7.4
Independent	John Forster	355	0.6	+0.6
Socialist Alliance		281	0.4	0.0

=== Elections in the 2000s ===
==== 2006 ====
2006 Tasmanian state election: Franklin
Party	Candidate	Votes	%	±%
Quota		10,660		
Labor	Paul Lennon (elected 1)	16,666	26.1	+7.9
Labor	Lara Giddings (elected 4)	6,725	10.5	+1.3
Labor	Paula Wriedt (elected 5)	5,089	8.0	−5.9
Labor	Ross Butler	1,066	1.7	+1.7
Labor	Daniel Hulme	620	1.0	+1.0
Liberal	Will Hodgman (elected 2)	14,055	22.0	+9.6
Liberal	Vanessa Goodwin	2,779	4.3	+4.3
Liberal	Steve Allie	1,575	2.5	+2.5
Liberal	Sue Bastone	866	1.4	+1.4
Liberal	Tony Scott	786	1.2	+1.2
Greens	Nick McKim (elected 3)	10,191	15.9	+3.3
Greens	Jane MacDonald	887	1.4	+1.4
Greens	Mike Anderson	478	0.7	+0.7
Greens	Mark Rickards	470	0.7	+0.7
Greens	Gerard Velnaar	394	0.6	+0.6
Independent	Ian Hall	564	0.9	+0.9
Independent	Richard James	489	0.8	+0.8
Socialist Alliance	Matthew Holloway	257	0.4	+0.4
Total formal votes		63,957	96.1	+0.7
Informal votes		2,566	3.9	−0.7
Turnout		66,523	95.2	+1.3
Party total votes
Labor		30,166	47.3	−4.6
Liberal		20,061	31.4	+7.6
Greens		12,420	19.3	−1.0
Independent	Ian Hall	564	0.9	+0.9
Independent	Richard James	489	0.8	+0.8
Socialist Alliance		257	0.4	+0.1

==== 2002 ====
2002 Tasmanian state election: Franklin
Party	Candidate	Votes	%	±%
Quota		10,088		
Labor	Paul Lennon (elected 1)	10,994	18.2	+5.1
Labor	Paula Wriedt (elected 2)	8,382	13.8	+3.6
Labor	Lara Giddings (elected 5)	5,548	9.2	+9.2
Labor	Doug Doust	2,732	4.5	+4.5
Labor	Carol Brown	1,993	3.3	+3.3
Labor	Neville Oliver	1,654	2.7	−1.1
Liberal	Will Hodgman (elected 4)	7,489	12.4	+12.4
Liberal	Martin McManus	3,687	6.1	+1.0
Liberal	Derek Smith	1,332	2.2	+2.2
Liberal	Anita Bromfield	1,063	1.8	+1.8
Liberal	Jeff Briscoe	787	1.3	+1.3
Greens	Nick McKim (elected 3)	7,622	12.6	+12.6
Greens	Liz Smith	1,434	2.4	+2.4
Greens	Kay McFarlane	1,131	1.9	+1.9
Greens	Paul Thomas	1,105	1.8	+1.8
Greens	Michele Higgins	1,052	1.7	+1.7
Democrats	Bryan Walpole	634	1.0	+1.0
Democrats	Debra Chandler	360	0.6	+0.6
Democrats	Karen Manskey	310	0.5	+0.5
Independent	Jane Shoobridge	375	0.6	+0.6
Group A	Kaye McPherson	184	0.3	+0.3
Group A	Donna Coleman	148	0.2	+0.2
Independent	Nigel Abbott	307	0.5	+0.5
Socialist Alliance	Brian Millar	103	0.2	+0.2
Socialist Alliance	Glenn Shields	99	0.2	+0.2
Total formal votes		60,525	95.4	−0.9
Informal votes		2,937	4.6	+0.9
Turnout		63,462	93.9	−1.3
Party total votes
Labor		31,303	51.7	+6.0
Liberal		14,358	23.7	−13.3
Greens		12,344	20.4	+10.0
Democrats		1,304	2.2	+0.5
Independent	Jane Shoebridge	375	0.6	+0.6
Group A		336	0.6	+0.6
Independent	Nigel Abbott	307	0.5	+0.5
Socialist Alliance		202	0.3	+0.3

=== Elections in the 1990s ===
==== 1998 ====
1998 Tasmanian state election: Franklin
Party	Candidate	Votes	%	±%
Quota		9,811		
Labor	Paul Lennon (elected 2)	7,708	13.1	+2.0
Labor	Fran Bladel (elected 4)	7,032	11.9	−1.6
Labor	Paula Wriedt (elected 5)	6,022	10.2	+4.6
Labor	Neville Oliver	2,241	3.8	+3.8
Labor	Trevor Cordwell	1,720	2.9	+2.9
Labor	Lin Thorp	1,216	2.1	−0.5
Labor	Ken Langston	949	1.6	+1.6
Liberal	Peter Hodgman (elected 1)	12,030	20.4	+10.0
Liberal	Matt Smith (elected 3)	3,176	5.4	+5.4
Liberal	Martin McManus	3,019	5.1	+5.1
Liberal	Jane Shoobridge	2,113	3.6	+3.6
Liberal	Mark Ashton	1,421	2.4	+2.4
Greens	Mike Foley	3,988	6.8	+0.8
Greens	Louise Crossley	763	1.3	−0.7
Greens	Penny King	496	0.8	0.0
Greens	Marie Giblin	367	0.6	+0.1
Tasmania First	Don Burgess	750	1.3	+1.3
Tasmania First	David Jackson	427	0.7	+0.7
Tasmania First	Dallas Hoggett	393	0.7	+0.7
Tasmania First	Carol Reynolds	380	0.6	+0.6
Tasmania First	Wendy Hyde	319	0.5	+0.5
Democrats	Robert Bell	821	1.4	+1.4
Democrats	Peter Kreet	158	0.3	+0.3
Independent	Sue Clark	342	0.6	+0.6
Independent	Flora Fox	323	0.5	+0.5
Group D	Rhonda Cains	83	0.1	+0.1
Group D	Graeme Norris	62	0.1	+0.1
Group D	Therese Hunniford	54	0.1	+0.1
Total formal votes		58,864	96.3	+1.3
Informal votes		2,262	3.7	−1.5
Turnout		61,126	95.2	−1.0
Party total votes
Labor		26,880	45.7	+3.0
Liberal		21,759	37.0	+5.0
Greens		6,105	10.4	−0.3
Tasmania First		2,269	3.9	+3.9
Democrats		979	1.7	−2.0
Independent	Sue Clark	342	0.6	+0.6
Independent	Flora Fox	323	0.5	+0.5
Group D		199	0.3	+0.3

==== 1996 ====
1996 Tasmanian state election: Franklin
Party	Candidate	Votes	%	±%
Quota		7,320		
Labor	Fran Bladel (elected 1)	7,933	13.5	+2.4
Labor	Paul Lennon (elected 2)	6,504	11.1	+4.5
Labor	Paula Wriedt (elected 7)	3,273	5.6	+5.6
Labor	John Sheppard	2,566	4.4	+2.7
Labor	Lin Thorp	1,548	2.6	+2.6
Labor	Eugene Alexander	1,284	2.2	+2.2
Labor	Greg Cooper	1,276	2.2	+2.2
Labor	Simon Boughey	602	1.0	+1.0
Liberal	Peter Hodgman (elected 3)	6,102	10.4	−13.3
Liberal	John Cleary (elected 4)	4,097	7.0	−3.0
Liberal	Paul Harriss	3,040	5.2	+5.2
Liberal	Bob Gozzi	2,150	3.7	+3.7
Liberal	Martin McManus	1,996	3.4	+3.4
Liberal	Brian Davison	795	1.4	−1.6
Liberal	Edyth Langham	546	0.9	+0.9
Greens	Mike Foley (elected 5)	3,515	6.0	+3.9
Greens	Louise Crossley	1,173	2.0	+2.0
Greens	Penny King	470	0.8	+0.8
Greens	Kay Carolin-McFarlane	313	0.5	+0.5
Greens	Marie Giblin	279	0.5	+0.5
Greens	Julian Bush	277	0.5	+0.5
Greens	Adam Bowden	223	0.4	+0.4
Group C	Bruce Goodluck (elected 6)	3,671	6.3	+6.3
Group C	Catherine Goodluck	639	1.1	+1.1
Democrats	Richard James	1,501	2.6	+2.6
Democrats	Liz Burton	323	0.6	+0.6
Democrats	Leonie Godridge	212	0.4	+0.4
Democrats	Rob Farrington	154	0.3	+0.3
Independent	John Devereux	862	1.5	+1.5
Extremely Greedy 40%	Tracey Newman	250	0.4	+0.4
Extremely Greedy 40%	Robert Cowburn	227	0.4	+0.4
National	Bill Darling	242	0.4	+0.4
National	Pat Rogers	189	0.3	+0.3
Independent	Chester Somerville	322	0.5	+0.5
Total formal votes		58,554	94.8	−1.0
Informal votes		3,182	5.2	+1.0
Turnout		61,736	96.2	+1.2
Party total votes
Labor		24,986	42.7	+8.9
Liberal		18,726	32.0	−14.3
Greens		6,250	10.7	−5.1
Group C		4,310	7.4	+7.4
Democrats		2,190	3.7	+3.7
Independent	John Devereux	862	1.5	+1.5
Extremely Greedy 40%		477	0.8	+0.8
National		431	0.7	+0.7
Independent	Chester Somerville	322	0.5	+0.5

==== 1992 ====
1992 Tasmanian state election: Franklin
Party	Candidate	Votes	%	±%
Quota		7,387		
Liberal	Peter Hodgman (elected 1)	13,987	23.7	+5.5
Liberal	John Cleary (elected 2)	5,902	10.0	−3.4
Liberal	Nigel Grace	1,801	3.0	+3.0
Liberal	Brian Davison (elected 6)	1,745	3.0	+1.4
Liberal	Claude Conlan	1,684	2.8	+2.8
Liberal	Jane Shoobridge	1,503	2.5	+2.5
Liberal	Tony Shanny	739	1.3	+1.3
Labor	Fran Bladel (elected 4)	6,580	11.1	+3.8
Labor	Michael Aird (elected 5)	6,218	10.5	+2.9
Labor	Paul Lennon (elected 7)	3,907	6.6	−1.1
Labor	John Sheppard	1,030	1.7	+1.7
Labor	David Traynor	835	1.4	+1.4
Labor	Darren Purcell	828	1.4	+1.4
Labor	Andrew MacLeod	548	0.9	+0.9
Independent Greens	Gerry Bates (elected 3)	7,042	11.9	−6.3
Independent Greens	Mike Foley	1,261	2.1	+2.1
Independent Greens	Penny King	295	0.5	+0.5
Independent Greens	Lorraine Wiltshire	253	0.4	+0.4
Independent Greens	Eva Ruzicka	216	0.4	+0.4
Independent Greens	Charles Ellis	154	0.3	+0.3
Independent Greens	Eilean Robinson	130	0.2	+0.2
Advance Tasmania	Clive Attwater	816	1.4	+1.4
Advance Tasmania	Philip French	696	1.2	+1.2
Advance Tasmania	Harry Grimsey	176	0.3	+0.3
Independent	Nigel Abbott	412	0.7	+0.7
Independent	Chris Munday	158	0.3	+0.3
Independent	Malcolm Muir	72	0.1	+0.1
Independent	Jane Flach	61	0.1	+0.1
Independent	Grant Goodwin	41	0.1	+0.1
Total formal votes		59,090	95.8	+0.7
Informal votes		2,565	4.2	−0.7
Turnout		61,655	95.0	+1.4
Party total votes
Liberal		27,361	46.3	+6.2
Labor		19,946	33.8	−4.5
Independent Greens		9,351	15.8	−3.9
Advance Tasmania		1,688	2.9	+2.9
Independent	Nigel Abbott	412	0.7	+0.7
Independent	Chris Munday	158	0.3	+0.3
Independent	Malcolm Muir	72	0.1	+0.1
Independent	Jane Flach	61	0.1	+0.1
Independent	Grant Goodwin	41	0.1	+0.1

=== Elections in the 1980s ===
==== 1989 ====
1989 Tasmanian state election: Franklin
Party	Candidate	Votes	%	±%
Quota		6,948		
Liberal	Peter Hodgman (elected 2)	10,132	18.2	+0.5
Liberal	Nick Evers (elected 3)	5,628	10.1	+2.0
Liberal	John Cleary (elected 4)	3,693	6.6	−0.2
Liberal	Brian Davison	884	1.6	+1.6
Liberal	Edyth Langham	855	1.5	+1.5
Liberal	John Peers	642	1.2	+1.2
Liberal	Jane Malecky	466	0.8	+0.8
Labor	Ken Wriedt (elected 6)	4,467	8.0	−8.9
Labor	Paul Lennon	4,267	7.7	+7.7
Labor	Michael Aird (elected 7)	4,197	7.6	+3.5
Labor	Fran Bladel (elected 5)	4,030	7.3	+1.9
Labor	Tony Reidy	2,460	4.4	+4.4
Labor	Ian Abbott	1,458	2.6	+2.6
Labor	Noela Foxcroft	399	0.7	+0.7
Independent Greens	Gerry Bates (elected 1)	10,143	18.2	+7.4
Independent Greens	Megan James	486	0.9	+0.9
Independent Greens	Flora Fox	342	0.6	+0.6
Democrats	Patsy Harmsen	369	0.7	+0.7
Democrats	Kent Rayner	303	0.5	+0.5
Democrats	Peter Walker	184	0.3	+0.3
Independent	Robin Griffiths	176	0.3	+0.3
Total formal votes		55,581	95.1	+0.8
Informal votes		2,860	4.9	−0.8
Turnout		58,441	93.6	−0.4
Party total votes
Liberal		22,300	40.1	−11.5
Labor		21,278	38.3	+1.8
Independent Greens		10,971	19.7	+7.8
Democrats		856	1.5	+1.5
Independent	Robin Griffiths	176	0.3	+0.3

==== 1986 ====
1986 Tasmanian state election: Franklin
Party	Candidate	Votes	%	±%
Quota		6,310		
Liberal	Peter Hodgman (elected 1)	8,919	17.7	+17.7
Liberal	Nick Evers (elected 5)	4,092	8.1	+8.1
Liberal	Geoff Pearsall (elected 3)	4,027	8.0	−5.1
Liberal	John Beattie (elected 4)	3,992	7.9	+0.2
Liberal	John Cleary	3,448	6.8	−3.8
Liberal	Ivan Pearson	820	1.6	+1.6
Liberal	Colin Howlett	741	1.5	+1.5
Labor	Ken Wriedt (elected 2)	8,507	16.8	−9.0
Labor	Fran Bladel (elected 7)	2,726	5.4	+5.4
Labor	Nick Sherry	2,396	4.7	+4.7
Labor	Michael Aird	2,068	4.1	+1.9
Labor	Bill McKinnon	1,977	3.9	+1.6
Labor	Unc Jager	405	0.8	+0.8
Labor	John Forster	361	0.7	+0.7
Independent Greens	Gerry Bates (elected 6)	5,468	10.8	+10.8
Independent Greens	Patsy Harmsen	532	1.1	+1.1
Total formal votes		50,479	94.3	+0.3
Informal votes		3,058	5.7	−0.3
Turnout		53,537	94.0	0.0
Party total votes
Liberal		26,039	51.6	+8.5
Labor		18,440	36.5	+0.4
Independent Greens		6,000	11.9	+11.9

==== 1982 ====
1982 Tasmanian state election: Franklin
Party	Candidate	Votes	%	±%
Quota		6,427		
Liberal	Geoff Pearsall (elected 3)	6,719	13.1	−2.6
Liberal	John Cleary (elected 4)	5,470	10.6	+6.8
Liberal	Graham Woodward	3,983	7.7	+7.7
Liberal	John Beattie (elected 7)	3,982	7.7	+0.2
Liberal	Bern Cuthbertson	910	1.8	+1.8
Liberal	Mrs S Dixson	775	1.5	+1.5
Liberal	Joan Ellims	296	0.6	+0.6
Labor	Ken Wriedt (elected 1)	13,250	25.8	+25.8
Labor	Bill McKinnon (elected 6)	1,190	2.3	+0.2
Labor	Michael Aird (elected 5)	1,143	2.3	−0.4
Labor	Dick Adams	1,093	2.1	+1.4
Labor	Stan Bell	819	1.6	+1.6
Labor	Kerry Fogarty	432	0.8	+0.8
Labor	Einstein Jager	350	0.7	+0.7
Labor	Murray Delphin	258	0.5	+0.5
Group D	Doug Lowe (elected 2)	7,458	14.5	+14.5
Group D	Dale Eagling	337	0.7	+0.7
Democrats	Peter Brown	1,838	3.6	−0.8
Democrats	June Francis	267	0.5	+0.5
Democrats	John Thompson	238	0.5	+0.5
Democrats	Bruce Kent	168	0.3	+0.1
Democrats	Malcolm Gregory	162	0.3	+0.3
Independent	Bill Spencer	164	0.3	+0.3
Independent	Alan Barnett	63	0.1	+0.1
Independent	Anthony Oldfield	31	0.1	+0.1
Independent	Edward Dyer	14	0.1	+0.1
Total formal votes		51,410	94.0	−2.7
Informal votes		3,270	6.0	+2.7
Turnout		54,680	94.0	−0.5
Party total votes
Liberal		22,135	43.1	+9.2
Labor		18,535	36.1	−24.7
Group D		7,795	15.2	+15.2
Democrats		2,673	5.2	+0.3
Independent	Bill Spencer	164	0.3	+0.3
Independent	Alan Barnett	63	0.1	+0.1
Independent	Anthony Oldfield	31	0.1	+0.1
Independent	Edward Dyer	14	0.1	+0.1

=== Elections in the 1970s ===
==== 1979 ====
1979 Tasmanian state election: Franklin
Party	Candidate	Votes	%	±%
Quota		6,096		
Labor	Doug Lowe (elected 1)	24,971	51.2	+36.5
Labor	Eric Barnard (elected 3)	1,538	3.2	−2.9
Labor	Michael Aird (elected 4)	1,321	2.7	−3.4
Labor	Bill McKinnon	1,037	2.1	+0.7
Labor	Dick Adams (elected 5)	327	0.7	+0.7
Labor	Stan Joiner	225	0.5	+0.5
Labor	Doreen Andrews	217	0.4	+0.4
Liberal	Geoff Pearsall (elected 2)	7,673	15.7	+7.3
Liberal	John Beattie (elected 6)	3,641	7.5	−5.3
Liberal	John Cleary (elected 7)	1,846	3.8	+3.8
Liberal	Chris Guesdon	1,361	2.8	+2.8
Liberal	Steve Gilmour	1,009	2.1	−3.2
Liberal	Bev Wills	580	1.2	+1.2
Liberal	Richard James	415	0.9	+0.9
Democrats	Peter Brown	2,142	4.4	+4.4
Democrats	John Harrison	161	0.3	+0.3
Democrats	Bruce Kent	79	0.2	+0.2
Independent	Tony Jackson	128	0.3	+0.3
Independent	Doris Wright	95	0.2	+0.2
Total formal votes		48,766	96.7	+0.5
Informal votes		1,675	3.3	−0.5
Turnout		50,441	94.5	−0.8
Party total votes
Labor		29,636	60.8	+1.4
Liberal		16,525	33.9	−2.0
Democrats		2,382	4.9	+4.9
Independent	Tony Jackson	128	0.3	+0.3
Independent	Doris Wright	95	0.2	+0.2

==== 1976 ====
1976 Tasmanian state election: Franklin
Party	Candidate	Votes	%	±%
Quota		5,913		
Labor	Bill Neilson (elected 1)	11,373	24.0	+6.9
Labor	Doug Lowe (elected 2)	6,944	14.7	+4.1
Labor	Ray Sherry (elected 4)	3,676	7.8	+7.8
Labor	Eric Barnard (elected 5)	2,891	6.1	−13.0
Labor	Jack Frost	1,291	2.7	−2.2
Labor	Bill McKinnon	656	1.4	+1.4
Labor	Peter Brown	645	1.4	+1.4
Labor	Raymond Woodruff	528	1.1	+1.1
Labor	Barrie Robinson	98	0.2	+0.2
Liberal	John Beattie (elected 3)	6,077	12.8	+3.4
Liberal	Geoff Pearsall (elected 6)	3,976	8.4	+3.5
Liberal	Steve Gilmour (elected 7)	2,516	5.3	+5.3
Liberal	Alan Duggan	1,735	3.7	+1.1
Liberal	Doug Clark	1,604	3.4	−5.2
Liberal	Thomas Dempsey	510	1.1	+1.1
Liberal	Roy Pallett	473	1.0	+1.0
Liberal	Frank O'Connor	103	0.2	+0.2
United Tasmania	Ria Ikin	562	1.2	+1.2
United Tasmania	John Levett	222	0.5	+0.5
United Tasmania	Brian Chapman	148	0.3	+0.3
United Tasmania	Rosemary Brown	145	0.3	+0.3
United Tasmania	Michael Davies	89	0.2	+0.2
United Tasmania	Judith Walker	89	0.2	+0.2
United Tasmania	Sharyn Harrison-Williams	44	0.1	+0.1
Independent	Leo Jarvis	334	0.7	+0.7
Independent	Bryan Threlfall	327	0.7	+0.7
Independent	Harry Priest	125	0.3	+0.3
Independent	Roger Francis	119	0.3	+0.3
Total formal votes		47,300	96.2	0.0
Informal votes		1,868	3.8	0.0
Turnout		49,168	95.3	0.0
Party total votes
Labor		28,102	59.4	+0.7
Liberal		16,994	35.9	+2.6
United Tasmania		1,299	2.7	−5.3
Independent	Leo Jarvis	334	0.7	+0.7
Independent	Bryan Threlfall	327	0.7	+0.7
Independent	Harry Priest	125	0.3	+0.3
Independent	Roger Francis	119	0.3	+0.3

==== 1972 ====
1972 Tasmanian state election: Franklin
Party	Candidate	Votes	%	±%
Quota		4,840		
Labor	Eric Barnard (elected 1)	7,398	19.1	+4.2
Labor	Bill Neilson (elected 2)	6,622	17.1	+2.9
Labor	Doug Lowe (elected 3)	4,116	10.6	+4.0
Labor	Jack Frost (elected 6)	1,907	4.9	+1.2
Labor	Suzanne Davidson	939	2.4	+2.4
Labor	John Lacey	931	2.4	+2.4
Labor	John Dillon	577	1.5	+0.2
Labor	Albert Schluter	250	0.6	+0.6
Liberal	John Beattie (elected 4)	3,643	9.4	+9.4
Liberal	Doug Clark (elected 5)	3,339	8.6	−4.4
Liberal	Geoff Pearsall (elected 7)	1,888	4.9	−2.6
Liberal	Stanley Gough	1,210	3.1	−2.3
Liberal	Alan Duggan	997	2.6	+2.6
Liberal	Leslie Thirgood	901	2.3	−0.8
Liberal	Anthony Neilson	622	1.6	+1.6
Liberal	Josephine Green	296	0.8	+0.8
United Tasmania	Ron Brown	2,077	5.4	+5.4
United Tasmania	Rod Broadby	638	1.6	+1.6
United Tasmania	Brenda Hean	363	0.9	+0.9
Total formal votes		38,714	96.2	+0.7
Informal votes		1,548	3.8	−0.7
Turnout		40,262	95.3	−0.5
Party total votes
Labor		22,740	58.7	+6.6
Liberal		12,896	33.3	−10.9
United Tasmania		3,078	8.0	+8.0

=== Elections in the 1960s ===
==== 1969 ====
1969 Tasmanian state election: Franklin
Party	Candidate	Votes	%	±%
Quota		4,453		
Labor	Eric Barnard (elected 1)	5,309	14.9	−2.4
Labor	Bill Neilson (elected 2)	5,062	14.2	−7.3
Labor	Doug Lowe (elected 4)	2,346	6.6	+6.6
Labor	Terry Martin	1,714	4.8	−3.4
Labor	John Parsons	1,380	3.9	+3.9
Labor	Jack Frost (elected 5)	1,311	3.7	+0.2
Labor	Daniel Doyle	949	2.7	+2.7
Labor	John Dillon	471	1.3	+1.3
Liberal	Doug Clark (elected 3)	4,647	13.0	+7.8
Liberal	Geoff Pearsall (elected 6)	2,673	7.5	−3.4
Liberal	Bill Young	2,429	6.8	−1.1
Liberal	Eric Iles	2,243	6.3	+3.3
Liberal	Stanley Gough (elected 7)	1,926	5.4	+5.4
Liberal	Leslie Thirgood	1,108	3.1	+3.1
Liberal	William Ryan	712	2.0	+2.0
Democratic Labor	Kathleen Delaney	516	1.4	+1.4
Democratic Labor	Denis Sainsbury	172	0.5	+0.5
Centre	Gerald Lyons	470	1.3	+1.3
Centre	James Earnshaw	181	0.5	+0.5
Total formal votes		35,619	95.5	+0.2
Informal votes		1,665	4.5	−0.2
Turnout		37,284	95.8	−0.4
Party total votes
Labor		18,542	52.1	−1.1
Liberal		15,738	44.2	+7.7
Democratic Labor		688	1.9	+1.9
Centre		651	1.8	+1.8

==== 1964 ====
1964 Tasmanian state election: Franklin
Party	Candidate	Votes	%	±%
Quota		4,978		
Labor	Bill Neilson (elected 1)	8,548	21.5	+8.7
Labor	Eric Barnard (elected 2)	4,980	12.5	+4.5
Labor	Terry Martin (elected 3)	3,279	8.2	+8.2
Labor	Jack Frost (elected 5)	1,383	3.5	+3.5
Labor	William Blackburn	995	2.5	+2.5
Labor	Ken Wriedt	768	1.9	+1.9
Labor	Clyde Harvey	645	1.6	+1.6
Labor	Lynda Heaven	592	1.5	−0.9
Liberal	Thomas Pearsall (elected 4)	3,880	9.7	+2.4
Liberal	Bill Young (elected 7)	3,130	7.9	+0.6
Liberal	Mabel Miller	2,268	5.7	−0.7
Liberal	Doug Clark (elected 6)	2,074	5.2	+5.2
Liberal	Ken Lowrie	1,299	3.3	+3.3
Liberal	Eric Iles	1,187	3.0	+3.0
Liberal	Jan Meldrum	688	1.7	+1.7
Country	James Skinner	617	1.5	+1.5
Country	Vernon Rae	472	1.2	+1.2
Country	Gordon Suhr	369	0.9	+0.9
Country	Kathleen Reynolds	292	0.7	+0.7
Country	Murrum Sweet	104	0.3	+0.3
Independent	Tim Jackson	1,062	2.7	+2.7
Democratic Labor	Virgil Morgan	1,059	2.7	−0.8
Independent	George Carr	132	0.3	+0.3
Total formal votes		39,823	95.3	+1.2
Informal votes		1,957	4.7	−1.2
Turnout		41,780	96.2	+0.8
Party total votes
Labor		21,190	53.2	+6.9
Liberal		14,526	36.5	−7.3
Country		1,854	4.7	+4.7
Independent	Tim Jackson	1,062	2.7	+2.7
Democratic Labor		1,059	2.7	−0.8
Independent	George Carr	132	0.3	+0.3

=== Elections in the 1950s ===
==== 1959 ====
1959 Tasmanian state election: Franklin
Party	Candidate	Votes	%	±%
Quota		4,014		
Labor	Bill Neilson (elected 2)	4,123	12.8	+0.3
Labor	John Dwyer (elected 3)	3,478	10.8	−5.2
Labor	Eric Barnard (elected 5)	2,580	8.0	+8.0
Labor	Colin Brooker	1,833	5.7	+5.7
Labor	Brian Crawford	1,702	5.3	−4.2
Labor	Lynda Heaven	767	2.4	+2.4
Labor	James Percey	378	1.2	−1.2
Liberal	Tim Jackson (elected 1)	4,416	13.8	−4.7
Liberal	Thomas Pearsall (elected 6)	2,339	7.3	−0.9
Liberal	Bill Young (elected 7)	2,246	7.0	+7.0
Liberal	Mabel Miller (elected 4)	2,042	6.4	−0.1
Liberal	Donald Cuthbertson	1,183	3.7	+3.7
Liberal	Stanley Gough	953	3.0	+3.0
Liberal	Richard Tallboys	888	2.8	+2.8
Democratic Labor	Virgil Morgan	1,116	3.5	+3.5
Democratic Labor	John Dwyer	844	2.6	+2.6
Democratic Labor	Henry Scoles	321	1.0	+1.0
Democratic Labor	Allan Powell	186	0.6	+0.6
Independent	Leo McPartlan	406	1.3	+1.3
Independent	Terry Bower	190	0.6	+0.6
Independent	Francis Hursey	119	0.4	+0.4
Total formal votes		32,110	94.1	−1.6
Informal votes		2,001	5.9	+1.6
Turnout		34,111	95.4	−0.5
Party total votes
Labor		14,861	46.3	−2.7
Liberal		14,067	43.8	+0.9
Democratic Labor		2,467	7.7	+5.0
Independent	Leo McPartlan	406	1.3	+1.3
Independent	Terry Bower	190	0.6	+0.6
Independent	Francis Hursey	119	0.4	+0.4

==== 1956 ====
1956 Tasmanian state election: Franklin
Party	Candidate	Votes	%	±%
Quota		4,246		
Labor	John Dwyer (elected 2)	4,747	16.0	+1.2
Labor	Bill Neilson (elected 3)	3,729	12.5	−0.9
Labor	Brian Crawford (elected 6)	2,813	9.5	+3.7
Labor	Charles Hand	2,211	7.4	−1.8
Labor	James Percey	723	2.4	+2.4
Labor	Clyde McNally	343	1.2	+1.2
Liberal	Tim Jackson (elected 1)	5,508	18.5	+10.3
Liberal	Thomas Pearsall (elected 5)	2,438	8.2	−1.7
Liberal	Doug Clark	1,947	6.6	+1.1
Liberal	Mabel Miller (elected 4)	1,924	6.5	−8.7
Liberal	Walter Rayner	726	2.4	−2.8
Liberal	Tasman Pitman	208	0.7	+0.7
Independent	Robert McDougall	1,585	5.3	+5.3
Labor (A-C)	Henry Roberts	352	1.2	+1.2
Labor (A-C)	Alfred Harrold	330	1.1	+1.1
Labor (A-C)	Francis Hursey	133	0.4	+0.4
Total formal votes		29,717	95.7	−0.5
Informal votes		1,345	4.3	+0.5
Turnout		31,062	95.9	+1.7
Party total votes
Labor		14,566	49.0	−0.9
Liberal		12,751	42.9	−3.6
Independent	Robert McDougall	1,585	5.3	+5.3
Labor (A-C)		815	2.7	+2.7

==== 1955 ====
1955 Tasmanian state election: Franklin
Party	Candidate	Votes	%	±%
Quota		5,289		
Labor	John Dwyer (elected 2)	5,483	14.8	+2.0
Labor	Bill Neilson (elected 3)	4,958	13.4	+1.7
Labor	Charles Hand (elected 4)	3,405	9.2	+1.0
Labor	Brian Crawford	2,137	5.8	+5.8
Labor	Mervyn Jacobson	1,678	4.5	+4.5
Labor	Daniel Malone	830	2.2	+2.2
Liberal	Mabel Miller (elected 1)	5,619	15.2	+15.2
Liberal	Thomas Pearsall (elected 5)	3,648	9.9	+1.6
Liberal	Tim Jackson (elected 6)	3,018	8.2	−4.9
Liberal	Doug Clark	2,049	5.5	+5.5
Liberal	Walter Rayner	1,939	5.2	+5.2
Liberal	Harold Hayes	959	2.6	+2.6
Independent	Leo McPartlan	1,299	3.5	+3.5
Total formal votes		37,022	96.2	+0.4
Informal votes		1,472	3.8	−0.4
Turnout		38,494	94.2	−1.3
Party total votes
Labor		18,491	49.9	+5.4
Liberal		17,232	46.5	−0.3
Independent	Leo McPartlan	1,299	3.5	+3.5

==== 1950 ====
1950 Tasmanian state election: Franklin
Party	Candidate	Votes	%	±%
Quota		4,288		
Liberal	Tim Jackson (elected 2)	3,930	13.1	+5.9
Liberal	Archibald Park (elected 5)	2,527	8.4	+3.2
Liberal	Harold Solomon	2,507	8.4	+8.4
Liberal	Thomas Pearsall (elected 6)	2,499	8.3	+8.3
Liberal	Ernest Barwick	1,771	5.9	+5.9
Liberal	Arthur Griffiths	807	2.7	+1.4
Labor	John Dwyer (elected 1)	3,845	12.8	−3.6
Labor	Bill Neilson (elected 3)	3,510	11.7	+1.2
Labor	Charles Hand (elected 4)	2,464	8.2	−1.6
Labor	George Robbie	2,202	7.3	+7.3
Labor	Edward Cullen	950	3.2	+3.2
Labor	Harry Fletcher	391	1.3	+1.3
Independent	George Gray	2,610	8.7	+0.4
Total formal votes		30,013	95.8	−0.1
Informal votes		1,318	4.2	+0.1
Turnout		31,331	95.5	+1.6
Party total votes
Liberal		14,041	46.8	+13.0
Labor		13,362	44.5	−3.3
Independent	George Gray (Group)	2,610	8.7	−9.1

=== Elections in the 1940s ===
==== 1948 ====
1948 Tasmanian state election: Franklin
Party	Candidate	Votes	%	±%
Quota		4,735		
Labor	John Dwyer (elected 1)	5,423	16.4	+8.8
Labor	Bill Neilson (elected 4)	3,471	10.5	+2.6
Labor	Charles Hand (elected 3)	3,249	9.8	+4.4
Labor	Rowland Worsley	1,591	4.8	+4.8
Labor	John Brown	1,443	4.4	+2.6
Labor	Marjorie Somerville	667	2.0	+2.0
Liberal	Reg Wright (elected 2)	5,226	15.8	+1.5
Liberal	Tim Jackson (elected 5)	2,395	7.2	+1.8
Liberal	Archibald Park	1,725	5.2	+1.0
Liberal	Olive Calvert	733	2.2	+2.2
Liberal	Ronald Morrisby	658	2.0	+2.0
Liberal	Artur Griffiths	475	1.4	+1.4
Group Independent	George Gray (elected 6)	2,754	8.3	+1.2
Group Independent	Thomas Pearsall	2,041	6.2	+6.2
Group Independent	Arthur Cross	578	1.7	+1.7
Group Independent	Royce Turnbull	519	1.6	+1.6
Independent	Leonard Martin	124	0.4	+0.4
Independent	Henry Martin	70	0.2	+0.2
Total formal votes		33,142	95.9	+6.4
Informal votes		1,415	4.1	−6.4
Turnout		34,557	93.9	+1.4
Party total votes
Labor		15,844	47.8	−3.7
Liberal		11,212	33.8	−1.4
Group Independent		5,892	17.8	+4.5
Independent	Leonard Martin	124	0.4	+0.4
Independent	Henry Martin	70	0.2	+0.2

==== 1946 ====
1946 Tasmanian state election: Franklin
Party	Candidate	Votes	%	±%
Quota		4,127		
Labor	Edward Brooker (elected 1)	5,802	20.1	−6.6
Labor	Bill Neilson (elected 4)	2,296	7.9	+7.9
Labor	John Dwyer (elected 3)	2,203	7.6	−5.7
Labor	Charles Hand	1,560	5.4	+5.4
Labor	Henry Hope	1,152	4.0	0.0
Labor	David Dicker	758	2.6	+2.6
Labor	Thomas McKinley	571	2.0	−7.5
Labor	John Brown	532	1.8	+1.8
Liberal	Reg Wright (elected 2)	4,141	14.3	+14.3
Liberal	Ron Brown	1,910	6.6	+6.6
Liberal	Tim Jackson (elected 6)	1,554	5.4	
Liberal	Archibald Park	1,205	4.2	+4.2
Liberal	Charles Geard	885	3.1	+3.1
Liberal	Donald Gatehouse	470	1.6	+1.6
Group Independent	George Gray (elected 5)	2,045	7.1	+7.1
Group Independent	Benjamin Pearsall	1,315	4.6	+4.6
Group Independent	Arthur Farley	335	1.2	+1.2
Group Independent	Joseph Nutting	153	0.5	+0.5
Total formal votes		28,887	89.5	−5.1
Informal votes		3,382	10.5	+5.1
Turnout		32,269	92.5	+0.3
Party total votes
Labor		14,874	51.5	−13.7
Liberal		10,165	35.2	+3.0
Group Independent		3,848	13.3	+13.3

==== 1941 ====
1941 Tasmanian state election: Franklin
Party	Candidate	Votes	%	±%
Quota		3,663		
Labor	Edward Brooker (elected 1)	6,841	26.7	+16.7
Labor	John Dwyer (elected 3)	3,398	13.3	+4.8
Labor	Thomas McKinley (elected 4)	2,434	9.5	+9.5
Labor	Basil Plummer	1,790	7.0	+3.2
Labor	Francis McDermott	1,213	4.7	+3.3
Labor	Henry Hope (elected 6)	1,038	4.0	+4.0
Nationalist	Henry Baker (elected 2)	3,782	14.8	−2.0
Nationalist	Benjamin Pearsall	1,165	4.5	−1.2
Nationalist	John McPhee (elected 5)	1,119	4.4	+4.4
Nationalist	John Piggott	620	2.4	−1.7
Nationalist	Arthur Crisp	520	2.0	+2.0
Nationalist	Vincent Shoobridge	479	1.9	−2.4
Nationalist	Albert Beards	373	1.5	+1.5
Nationalist	Leo McPartlan	188	0.7	+0.7
Independent	Thomas Kimber	680	2.7	+2.7
Total formal votes		25,640	94.6	−3.1
Informal votes		1,474	5.4	+3.1
Turnout		27,114	92.2	−3.6
Party total votes
Labor		16,714	65.2	+6.6
Nationalist		8,246	32.2	−9.2
Independent	Thomas Kimber	680	2.7	+2.7

=== Elections in the 1930s ===
==== 1937 ====
1937 Tasmanian state election: Franklin
Party	Candidate	Votes	%	±%
Quota		3,685		
Labor	Albert Ogilvie (elected 1)	9,008	34.9	+9.5
Labor	Edward Brooker (elected 4)	2,571	10.0	0.0
Labor	John Dwyer (elected 3)	2,190	8.5	−1.7
Labor	Basil Plummer (elected 5)	977	3.8	+3.8
Labor	Francis McDermott	365	1.4	+1.4
Nationalist	Henry Baker (elected 2)	4,330	16.8	+4.1
Nationalist	George Doyle (elected 6)	1,838	7.1	+7.1
Nationalist	Benjamin Pearsall	1,462	5.7	+5.7
Nationalist	Vincent Shoobridge	1,105	4.3	+4.3
Nationalist	John Piggott	1,062	4.1	+4.1
Nationalist	Andrew Cooper	592	2.3	+2.3
Nationalist	Benjamin Watkins	289	1.1	−4.3
Total formal votes		25,789	97.7	+0.4
Informal votes		596	2.3	−0.4
Turnout		26,385	95.8	+0.7
Party total votes
Labor		15,111	58.6	+6.7
Nationalist		10,678	41.4	+3.6

==== 1934 ====
1934 Tasmanian state election: Franklin
Party	Candidate	Votes	%	±%
Quota		3,535		
Labor	Albert Ogilvie (elected 1)	6,295	25.4	+9.5
Labor	John Dwyer (elected 2)	2,528	10.2	+3.4
Labor	Edward Brooker (elected 6)	2,481	10.0	−7.3
Labor	Charles Frost	1,538	6.2	+6.2
Nationalist	Henry Baker (elected 3)	3,135	12.7	−7.7
Nationalist	Alfred Seabrook	1,709	6.9	−0.3
Nationalist	John Evans (elected 4)	1,614	6.5	−0.6
Nationalist	Benjamin Watkins	1,326	5.4	+5.4
Nationalist	George Harvey	902	3.6	+3.6
Nationalist	Albert Beard	658	2.7	+2.7
Independent	Benjamin Pearsall (elected 5)	1,790	7.2	0.0
Independent	Peter Murdoch	768	3.1	−2.0
Total formal votes		24,744	97.3	+0.4
Informal votes		688	2.7	−0.4
Turnout		25,432	95.1	−0.4
Party total votes
Labor		12,842	51.9	+20.1
Nationalist		9,344	37.8	−6.1
Independent	Benjamin Pearsall	1,790	7.2	0.0
Independent	Peter Murdoch	768	3.1	−2.0

==== 1931 ====
1931 Tasmanian state election: Franklin
Party	Candidate	Votes	%	±%
Quota		3,210		
Nationalist	Henry Baker (elected 1)	4,583	20.4	+10.3
Nationalist	Alfred Seabrook (elected 6)	1,612	7.2	+7.2
Nationalist	John Evans (elected 4)	1,593	7.1	−1.8
Nationalist	John Piggott	1,303	5.8	−8.4
Nationalist	Derrick Burgess	532	2.4	+2.4
Nationalist	Clarence Rennie	252	1.1	+1.1
Labor	Albert Ogilvie (elected 2)	3,930	17.5	−7.7
Labor	John Dwyer (elected 3)	1,531	6.8	+6.8
Labor	William McGann	661	2.9	+2.9
Labor	Edward Brooker	612	2.7	+2.7
Labor	John Hohne	413	1.8	−0.3
Independent	Benjamin Watkins (elected 5)	2,276	10.1	+10.1
Independent	Benjamin Pearsall	1,626	7.2	−0.5
Independent	Peter Murdoch	1,156	5.1	−0.7
Independent	George Collis	389	1.7	+1.7
Total formal votes		22,469	96.9	−0.3
Informal votes		707	3.1	+0.3
Turnout		23,176	95.5	+14.3
Party total votes
Nationalist		9,875	43.9	+6.5
Labor		7,147	31.8	−11.7
Independent	Benjamin Watkins	2,276	10.1	+10.1
Independent	Benjamin Pearsall	1,626	7.2	−0.5
Independent	Peter Murdoch	1,156	5.1	−0.7
Independent	George Collis	389	1.7	+1.7

=== Elections in the 1920s ===
==== 1928 ====
14668

1928 Tasmanian state election: Franklin
Party	Candidate	Votes	%	±%
Quota		2,589		
Labor	Albert Ogilvie (elected 1)	4,570	25.2	−3.0
Labor	Benjamin Watkins (elected 3)	1,231	6.8	+1.6
Labor	William Sheridan	489	2.7	−4.1
Labor	Charles Frost	417	2.3	+2.3
Labor	John Hohne	377	2.1	+2.1
Labor	Samuel Lyden	372	2.1	+2.1
Labor	Will Reece	286	1.6	+1.6
Labor	William Michael	144	0.8	+0.8
Nationalist	John Piggott (elected 2)	2,564	14.2	+6.7
Nationalist	Henry Baker (elected 5)	1,833	10.1	+10.1
Nationalist	John Evans (elected 4)	1,606	8.9	−6.0
Nationalist	George Cummins	780	4.3	−4.4
Independent	Benjamin Pearsall (elected 6)	1,391	7.7	+0.4
Independent	Peter Murdoch	1,043	5.8	−2.9
Independent	John Earle	910	5.0	+5.0
Independent	Winston Triffitt	106	0.6	+0.6
Total formal votes		18,119	97.2	−1.0
Informal votes		527	2.8	+1.0
Turnout		18,646	81.2	+17.3
Party total votes
Labor		7,886	43.5	−7.4
Nationalist		6,783	37.4	+11.8
Independent	Benjamin Pearsall	1,391	7.7	+0.4
Independent	Peter Murdoch	1,043	5.8	−2.9
Independent	John Earle	910	5.0	+5.0
Independent	Winston Triffitt	106	0.6	+0.6

==== 1925 ====
1925 Tasmanian state election: Franklin
Party	Candidate	Votes	%	±%
Quota		2,096		
Labor	Albert Ogilvie (elected 1)	4,130	28.2	+14.6
Labor	William Sheridan (elected 3)	992	6.8	+6.8
Labor	Benjamin Watkins (elected 4)	760	5.2	+1.1
Labor	Samuel Lyden	574	3.9	+3.9
Labor	John Lewis	514	3.5	+3.5
Labor	Douglas Thompson	247	1.7	+1.7
Labor	Winston Triffitt	244	1.7	+1.7
Nationalist	John Evans (elected 2)	2,187	14.9	+3.3
Nationalist	George Cummins	1,270	8.7	+0.6
Nationalist	Richard Johnson	297	2.0	+2.0
Independent	Peter Murdoch (elected 5)	1,277	8.7	+1.6
Independent	John Piggott (elected 6)	1,100	7.5	−1.4
Independent	Benjamin Pearsall	1,076	7.3	+1.8
Total formal votes		14,668	97.7	+0.6
Informal votes		338	2.3	−0.6
Turnout		15,006	63.9	+3.0
Party total votes
Labor		7,461	50.9	+18.7
Nationalist		3,754	25.6	−12.5
Independent	Peter Murdoch	1,277	8.7	+8.7
Independent	John Piggott	1,100	7.5	+7.5
Independent	Benjamin Pearsall	1,076	7.3	+7.3

==== 1922 ====
1922 Tasmanian state election: Franklin
Party	Candidate	Votes	%	±%
Quota		1,932		
Nationalist	John Evans (elected 3)	1,569	11.6	+0.5
Nationalist	Alexander Hean (elected 4)	1,224	9.0	+1.4
Nationalist	George Cummins	1,089	8.1	−1.2
Nationalist	Peter Murdoch (elected 5)	955	7.1	+7.1
Nationalist	Arthur Sibley	309	2.3	+2.3
Labor	Albert Ogilvie (elected 1)	1,839	13.6	+7.0
Labor	William Pearce (elected 6)	1,083	8.0	+5.5
Labor	Benjamin Watkins	551	4.1	0.0
Labor	William Shoobridge	462	3.4	0.0
Labor	J. J. Kenneally	415	3.1	+3.1
Country	John Piggott (elected 2)	1,200	8.9	+8.9
Country	Benjamin Pearsall	742	5.5	+5.5
Country	William Dixon	636	4.7	+4.7
Country	John Newman	461	3.4	+3.4
Independent Labor	David Dicker	754	5.6	+5.6
Independent Labor	Thomas Keogh	135	1.0	+1.0
Independent	Thomas O'Brien	94	0.7	+0.7
Total formal votes		13,518	97.1	+0.4
Informal votes		398	2.9	−0.4
Turnout		13,916	60.9	−4.2
Party total votes
Nationalist		5,146	38.1	−13.9
Labor		4,350	32.2	−12.7
Country		3,039	22.5	+22.5
Independent Labor		889	7.3	+7.3
Independent	Thomas O'Brien	94	0.7	+0.7

=== Elections in the 1910s ===
==== 1919 ====
1919 Tasmanian state election: Franklin
Party	Candidate	Votes	%	±%
Quota		2,026		
Nationalist	John Evans (elected 4)	1,574	11.1	−3.7
Nationalist	George Cummins	1,317	9.3	+9.3
Nationalist	William Dixon (elected 6)	1,102	7.8	+7.8
Nationalist	Alexander Hean (elected 5)	1,081	7.6	−2.6
Nationalist	Arthur Cotton	983	6.9	−1.4
Nationalist	Arthur Morrisby	589	4.2	+4.2
Nationalist	Frank Rathbone	378	2.7	+2.7
Nationalist	Richard Johnson	182	1.3	+1.3
Nationalist	Francis Hyndes	161	1.1	+1.1
Labor	David Dicker (elected 1)	3,037	21.4	+12.7
Labor	Albert Ogilvie (elected 2)	938	6.6	+6.6
Labor	Benjamin Watkins (elected 3)	585	4.1	+4.1
Labor	Thomas Keogh	533	3.8	+3.8
Labor	William Shoobridge	489	3.4	−5.4
Labor	Will Reece	426	3.0	+3.0
Labor	William Pearce	354	2.5	+2.5
Independent	Nicholas Brooks	448	3.2	+3.2
Total formal votes		14,177	96.7	+3.3
Informal votes		490	3.3	−3.3
Turnout		14,667	65.1	−9.1
Party total votes
Nationalist		7,367	52.0	+0.2
Labor		6,362	44.9	−3.3
Independent	Nicholas Brooks	448	3.2	+3.2

==== 1916 ====
1916 Tasmanian state election: Franklin
Party	Candidate	Votes	%	±%
Quota		2,191		
Liberal	Frederick Burbury (elected 2)	2,819	18.4	+18.4
Liberal	John Evans (elected 3)	2,277	14.8	+1.6
Liberal	Alexander Hean (elected 6)	1,572	9.3	0.0
Liberal	Arthur Cotton	1,270	8.3	−10.7
Labor	John Earle (elected 1)	3,943	25.7	+4.5
Labor	William Shoobridge (elected 4)	1,350	8.8	+8.8
Labor	David Dicker (elected 5)	1,335	8.7	+2.7
Labor	George Martin	769	5.0	−5.4
Total formal votes		15,335	93.4	−3.4
Informal votes		1,086	6.6	+3.4
Turnout		16,421	74.2	+3.0
Party total votes
Liberal		7,938	51.8	−4.4
Labor		7,397	48.2	+4.4

==== 1913 ====
{{|party = Labor TAS

1913 Tasmanian state election: Franklin
Party		Candidate	Votes	%	±%												
Quota			2,178														
	Liberal	Arthur Cotton (elected 2)	2,897	19.0	+11.5												
	Liberal	John Evans (elected 3)	2,007	13.2	+1.1												
	Liberal	Norman Ewing (elected 4)	1,747	11.5	−0.9												
	Liberal	Alexander Hean	1,422	9.3	−2.8												
	Liberal	Alfred McDermott	493	3.2	+3.2												
	Labor	John Earle (elected 1)	3,234	21.2	−1.4												
	Labor	George Martin (elected 5)	1,573	5.0	−5.4												
		{{{}}}	{{{}}}	{{{}}}	{{|main|{{{}}}|-0.01|−0.01|-0.02|−0.02|-0.03|−0.03|-0.04|−0.04|-0.05|−0.05|-0.06|−0.06|-0.07|−0.07|-0.08|−0.08|-0.09|−0.09|-0.1|−0.1|-0.2|−0.2|-0.3|−0.3|-0.4|−0.4|-0.5|−0.5|-0.6|−0.6|-0.7|−0.7|-0.8|−0.8|-0.9|−0.9|-1|−1|-2|−2|-3|−3|-4|−4|-5|−5|-6|−6|-7|−7|-8|−8|-9|−9}}												
candidate = David Dicker (elected 6)	votes = 920	percentage = 6.0	change = −5.2 }} {{|votes = 15,243	percentage = 96.8	change = −0.4 }} {{|votes = 496	percentage = 3.2	change = +0.4 }} {{|votes = 15,739	percentage = 71.2	change = −6.4 }} {{}} {{|party = Tasmanian Liberal League	candidate =	votes = 8,566	percentage = 56.2	change = −1.1 }} {{|party = Labor TAS	candidate =	votes = 6,677	percentage = 43.8	change = +1.1 }} {{}}
