= Candidates of the 1989 Tasmanian state election =

The 1989 Tasmanian state election was held on 13 May 1989.

== Retiring Members ==
=== Liberal ===
- John Beattie MLA (Franklin)

== House of Assembly ==
Sitting members are shown in bold text. Tickets that elected at least one MHA are highlighted in the relevant colour. Successful candidates are indicated by an asterisk (*).

=== Bass ===
Seven seats were up for election. The Labor Party was defending three seats. The Liberal Party was defending four seats.

| Labor candidates | Liberal candidates | Green Inds candidates | Democrats candidates |
|---|---|---|---|
| Jim Cox*; **Harry Holgate***; **Gill James**; **Peter Patmore***; Helen Polley; John Swallow; Geoff Sweet; Richard Taylor | **John Beswick***; Malcolm Carins; David Fry; **Frank Madill***; Leon Miller; **Peter Rae**; **Neil Robson*** | Lance Armstrong*; John Ball; Patricia Ratcliff | Michelle-Ronwyn Dowlman; Kathy Maxwell-Petrovsky |

=== Braddon ===
Seven seats were up for election. The Labor Party was defending three seats. The Liberal Party was defending four seats.

| Labor candidates | Liberal candidates | Green Inds candidates | Ungrouped candidates |
|---|---|---|---|
| David Currie; Tom Eggleston; **Michael Field***; David Nettleton; **Greg Peart**; Bruce Tivendale; **Michael Weldon*** | **Bill Bonde***; Carole Cains; **Ron Cornish***; **Roger Groom***; Ron Nankervis; **Tony Rundle***; Heather Wall | Di Hollister*; Arnold Rowlands; Peter Walford | Heather Benjamin; Lawrence Edwards; George Lee; Ted Nielsen |

=== Denison ===
Seven seats were up for election. The Labor Party was defending three seats. The Liberal Party was defending three seats. The Green Independents were defending one seat.

| Labor candidates | Liberal candidates | Green Inds candidates | Democrats candidates | Ungrouped candidates |
|---|---|---|---|---|
| **Neil Batt**; David Crean*; Catherine Cuthbert; Andrew Daniels; **Judy Jackson***; Charles Touber; **John White*** | Neil Ames; **John Barker***; **John Bennett***; Beth Darcey; Chris Gibson; **Ray Groom***; Tony Steven | Sheena Brookman; **Bob Brown***; Patsy Jones; Michael Lynch | Robert Bell; Wendy Cuskelly; June Francis | Anthony Delara |

=== Franklin ===
Seven seats were up for election. The Labor Party was defending two seats. The Liberal Party was defending four seats. The Green Independents were defending one seat.

| Labor candidates | Liberal candidates | Green Inds candidates | Democrats candidates | Ungrouped candidates |
|---|---|---|---|---|
| Ian Abbott; Michael Aird*; **Fran Bladel***; Noela Foxcroft; Paul Lennon; Tony Reidy; **Ken Wriedt*** | **John Cleary***; Brian Davison; **Nick Evers***; **Peter Hodgman***; Edyth Langham; Jane Malecky; John Peers | **Gerry Bates***; Flora Fox; Megan James | Patsy Harmsen; Kent Rayner; Peter Walker | Robin Griffiths |

=== Lyons ===
Seven seats were up for election. The Labor Party was defending three seats. The Liberal Party was defending four seats.

| Labor candidates | Liberal candidates | Green Inds candidates | Democrats candidates |
|---|---|---|---|
| **Chris Batt**; Wendy Carcinelli; Carole Coppleman; Terry Field; **David Llewellyn***; **Michael Polley***; Gary Whitney | **Ian Braid***; **Robin Gray***; The Duke of Avram*; Ron Limb; **Bob Mainwaring**; **Graeme Page***; Stephen Salter | Laurie Goldsworthy; Diane Masters; Christine Milne* | Sarah Hancock; Liz Holloway |

== See also ==
- Members of the Tasmanian House of Assembly, 1986–1989
- Members of the Tasmanian House of Assembly, 1989–1992
