= Candidates of the 1998 Tasmanian state election =

The 1998 Tasmanian state election was held on 29 August 1998.

== Retiring Members ==
=== Labor ===
- John White (Denison)

=== Liberal ===
- John Beswick (Bass)
- John Cleary (Franklin)
- Ron Cornish (Braddon)

=== Independent ===
- Bruce Goodluck (Franklin)

== House of Assembly ==
Sitting members are shown in bold text. Tickets that elected at least one MHA are highlighted in the relevant colour. Successful candidates are indicated by an asterisk (*).

=== Bass ===
Five seats were up for election, down from seven in 1996. The Labor Party was defending three seats. The Liberal Party was defending four seats.

Labor candidates	Liberal candidates	Greens candidates	Democrats candidates	TFP candidates	Ungrouped candidates
**Jim Cox***; Noel Hodgetts; **Gill James***; Peter Kearney; Steven Neville; **Peter Patmore***; Helen Polley	**Tony Benneworth**; David Fry; **Frank Madill***; **Sue Napier***; John Temple	Kim Booth; Louise Fairfax; Garth Faulkner; Karan Jurs; Samantha Kerr-Smiley	Bob Bensemann; Debbie Butler; Roberta Harkness; Duncan Mills; Philip Tattersall	Tony Bagshaw; Robert Blake; Merilyn Crack; Louise Leslie; Harvey Smith; Robert Wallace	Roy Slater; Tim Woolnough

=== Braddon ===
Five seats were up for election, down from seven in 1996. The Labor Party was defending two seats. The Liberal Party was defending four seats. The Tasmanian Greens were defending one seat.

Labor candidates	Liberal candidates	Greens candidates	TFP candidates	Group B candidates	Group E candidates	Ungrouped candidates
**Brenton Best***; Ella Bramich; **Mike Gard**; Bryan Green*; Peter Hollister; Steve Kons*; Stuart Mackey	**Bill Bonde***; **Carole Cains**; **Tony Rundle***; Brett Whiteley; Michael Wickham	Oliver Field; **Di Hollister**; Paul O'Halloran; Karin Packer; Clare Thompson	Petita Abblitt; Gary Lane; Peter Rettke; Gavin Thompson; Wally Weaver	Laurie Heathorn; John Mackenzie	Peter Stokes; Andrew Vanderfeen	Rodney Blenkhorn

=== Denison ===
Five seats were up for election, down from seven in 1996. The Labor Party was defending three seats. The Liberal Party was defending three seats. The Tasmanian Greens were defending one seat.

Labor candidates	Liberal candidates	Greens candidates	Democrats candidates	TFP candidates	Group B candidates	Ungrouped candidates
**Jim Bacon***; Andy Bennett; Luigi Bini; Deb Carnes; **Judy Jackson***; Gwynn Mac Carrick; Stuart Slade	**Bob Cheek***; **Ray Groom***; **Michael Hodgman**; Steven Mavrigiannakis; John Remess	Simon Baptist; Dick Friend; Mat Hines; Trish Moran; **Peg Putt***	Brent Blackburn; Chris Ivory	Geoff Churchill; Frank Hesman; Inez McCarthy; John Presser; Barbara Woods	Jenny Forward; Mathew Munro	Gregory Broszczyk; Bob Campbell; Bob Elliston; Informal; Matthew Piscioneri

=== Franklin ===
Five seats were up for election, down from seven in 1996. The Labor Party was defending three seats. The Liberal Party was defending two seats. The Tasmanian Greens were defending one seat. One seat had been held by Independent MHA Bruce Goodluck.

Labor candidates	Liberal candidates	Greens candidates	Democrats candidates	TFP candidates	Group D candidates	Ungrouped candidates
**Fran Bladel***; Trevor Cordwell; Ken Langston; **Paul Lennon***; Neville Oliver; Lin Thorp; **Paula Wriedt***	Mark Ashton; **Peter Hodgman***; Martin McManus; Jane Shoobridge; Matt Smith*	Louise Crossley; **Mike Foley**; Marie Giblin; Penny King; Rachel Leary	Robert Bell; Peter Kreet	Don Burgess; Dallas Hoggett; Wendy Hyde; David Jackson; Carol Reynolds	Rhonda Cains; Theresa Hunniford; Graeme Norris	Sue Clark; Flora Fox

=== Lyons ===
Five seats were up for election, down from seven in 1996. The Labor Party was defending three seats. The Liberal Party was defending three seats. The Tasmanian Greens were defending one seat.

Labor candidates	Liberal candidates	Greens candidates	TFP candidates
Ken Bacon*; **Lara Giddings**; **David Llewellyn***; **Michael Polley***; Danial Rochford; Scott Wiggins	John Gee; **Rene Hidding***; **Bob Mainwaring**; **Denise Swan***; Carmel Torenius	Sonia Chirgwin; John Collins; Ted Field; **Christine Milne**; Neil Smith	Will Frank; Darryl Gerrity; Jack Kelly; Dave Pickford; M. Turner

== See also ==
- Members of the Tasmanian House of Assembly, 1996–1998
- Members of the Tasmanian House of Assembly, 1998–2002
