= Results of the 1998 Tasmanian state election =

Tasmanian state election, 29 August 1998 House of Assembly << 1996–2002 >>
Enrolled voters	322,754				
Votes cast	306,655		Turnout	95.01	–0.97
Informal votes	11,977		Informal	3.91	–1.49
Summary of votes by party
Party	Primary votes	%	Swing	Seats	Change
Labor	131,981	44.79	+4.32	14	± 0
Liberal	112,146	38.06	–3.14	10	– 6
Greens	30,008	10.18	–0.96	1	– 3
Tasmania First	15,017	5.10	+5.10	0	± 0
Democrats	2,627	0.89	+0.15	0	± 0
Democratic Socialist	102	0.03	+0.03	0	± 0
Independent	2,797	0.95	–2.54	0	– 1
Others			–2.96	0	± 0
Total	294,678			25	

This is a list of House of Assembly results for the 1998 Tasmanian election.

== Results by division ==
=== Bass ===
1998 Tasmanian state election: Bass
Party	Candidate	Votes	%	±%
Quota		9,770		
Liberal	Sue Napier (elected 1)	9,068	15.5	+4.9
Liberal	Frank Madill (elected 3)	6,646	11.3	−3.0
Liberal	Tony Benneworth	5,273	9.0	+2.9
Liberal	David Fry	2,865	4.9	−0.3
Liberal	John Temple	742	1.3	+1.3
Labor	Peter Patmore (elected 2)	7,230	12.3	+2.1
Labor	Jim Cox (elected 4)	6,741	11.5	+5.9
Labor	Gill James (elected 5)	4,976	8.5	+0.1
Labor	Helen Polley	2,782	4.7	+1.0
Labor	Noel Hodgetts	1,036	1.8	+1.8
Labor	Peter Kearney	755	1.3	+1.3
Labor	Steven Neville	579	1.0	+1.0
Greens	Kim Booth	3,160	5.4	+5.4
Greens	Louise Fairfax	797	1.4	+0.7
Greens	Samantha Kerr-Smiley	549	0.9	+0.9
Greens	Garth Faulkner	448	0.8	+0.8
Greens	Karan Jurs	372	0.6	+0.6
Tasmania First	Robert Blake	948	1.6	+1.6
Tasmania First	Louise Leslie	784	1.3	+1.3
Tasmania First	Harvey Smith	456	0.8	+0.8
Tasmania First	Merilyn Crack	405	0.7	+0.7
Tasmania First	Robert Wallace	381	0.7	+0.7
Tasmania First	Tony Bagshaw	374	0.6	+0.6
Democrats	Debbie Butler	443	0.8	+0.8
Democrats	Roberta Harkness	166	0.3	+0.3
Democrats	Rob Bensemann	134	0.2	+0.2
Democrats	Philip Tattersall	104	0.2	+0.2
Democrats	Duncan Mills	102	0.2	+0.2
Independent	Ray Slater	171	0.3	+0.3
Independent	Tim Woolnough	127	0.2	+0.2
Total formal votes		58,614	95.9	+1.6
Informal votes		2,487	4.1	−1.6
Turnout		61,101	94.5	−1.2
Party total votes
Liberal		24,594	41.9	−5.8
Labor		24,099	41.1	+2.2
Greens		5,326	9.1	−1.2
Tasmania First		3,348	5.7	+5.7
Democrats		949	1.6	+1.6
Independent	Ray Slater	171	0.3	+0.3
Independent	Tim Woolnough	127	0.2	+0.2

=== Braddon ===
1998 Tasmanian state election: Braddon
Party	Candidate	Votes	%	±%
Quota		9,355		
Labor	Steve Kons (elected 2)	9,881	17.6	+17.6
Labor	Brenton Best (elected 3)	4,087	7.3	+2.9
Labor	Bryan Green (elected 4)	4,088	7.3	+2.7
Labor	Mike Gard	2,272	4.0	+1.4
Labor	Peter Hollister	2,007	3.6	+3.6
Labor	Ella Bramich	1,585	2.8	+2.8
Labor	Stuart Mackey	810	1.4	+1.4
Liberal	Tony Rundle (elected 1)	12,903	23.0	+13.2
Liberal	Brett Whiteley	3,599	6.4	+6.4
Liberal	Carole Cains	3,365	6.0	−0.2
Liberal	Bill Bonde (elected 5)	3,248	5.8	−7.2
Liberal	Michael Wickham	602	1.1	+0.1
Greens	Di Hollister	3,925	7.0	−1.0
Greens	Paul O'Halloran	200	0.4	+0.2
Greens	Oliver Field	170	0.3	+0.3
Greens	Clare Thompson	164	0.3	+0.3
Greens	Karin Packer	104	0.2	+0.2
Tasmania First	Peter Rettke	621	1.1	+1.1
Tasmania First	Gavin Thompson	552	1.0	+1.0
Tasmania First	Petita Abblitt	349	0.6	+0.6
Tasmania First	Wally Weaver	219	0.4	+0.4
Tasmania First	Gary Lane	168	0.3	+0.3
Group E	Peter Stokes	348	0.6	+0.6
Group E	Andrew Vanderfeen	258	0.5	−0.2
Group B	Laurie Heathorn	250	0.4	+0.3
Group B	John Mackenzie	62	0.1	0.0
Independent	Rodney Blenkhorn	289	0.5	+0.5
Total formal votes		56,126	95.8	+1.4
Informal votes		2,456	4.2	−1.4
Turnout		58,582	96.1	−0.4
Party total votes
Labor		24,730	44.1	+9.7
Liberal		23,717	42.2	−7.4
Greens		4,563	8.2	−0.9
Tasmania First		1,909	3.4	+3.4
Group E		606	1.1	+1.1
Group B		312	0.6	−0.7
Independent	Rodney Blenkhorn	289	0.5	+0.5

=== Denison ===
1998 Tasmanian state election: Denison
Party	Candidate	Votes	%	±%
Quota		9,899		
Labor	Jim Bacon (elected 1)	18,901	31.8	+17.1
Labor	Judy Jackson (elected 2)	2,968	5.0	−1.5
Labor	Gwynn Mac Carrick	1,854	3.1	+3.1
Labor	Andy Bennett	1,281	2.2	+2.2
Labor	Stuart Slade	1,093	1.8	+0.1
Labor	Luigi Bini	797	1.3	+1.3
Labor	Deb Carnes	608	1.0	+1.0
Liberal	Bob Cheek (elected 3)	7,652	12.9	+6.3
Liberal	Ray Groom (elected 4)	6,430	10.8	−5.4
Liberal	Michael Hodgman	4,141	7.0	+0.3
Liberal	John Remess	2,843	4.8	+4.8
Liberal	Steven Mavrigiannakis	435	0.7	+0.7
Greens	Peg Putt (elected 5)	6,263	10.5	+0.9
Greens	Dick Friend	462	0.8	−1.2
Greens	Trish Moran	460	0.8	+0.3
Greens	Simon Baptist	306	0.5	+0.5
Greens	Mat Hines	298	0.5	+0.5
Tasmania First	John Presser	464	0.8	+0.8
Tasmania First	Geoff Churchill	303	0.5	+0.5
Tasmania First	Frank Hesman	223	0.4	+0.4
Tasmania First	Inez McCarthy	192	0.3	+0.3
Tasmania First	Barbara Woods	187	0.3	+0.3
Democrats	Chris Ivory	354	0.6	+0.6
Democrats	Brent Blackburn	345	0.6	+0.6
Independent	Bob Elliston	186	0.3	+0.3
Independent	Informal	103	0.2	−0.3
Group B	Jenny Forward	65	0.1	+0.1
Group B	Mathew Munro	37	0.1	+0.1
Independent	Matthew D. Piscioneri	56	0.1	+0.1
Independent	Bob Campbell	44	0.1	+0.1
Independent	Gregory Broszczyk	39	0.1	+0.1
Total formal votes		59,390	96.3	+1.5
Informal votes		2,310	3.7	−1.5
Turnout		61,700	93.8	−1.4
Party total votes
Labor		27,502	46.3	+0.9
Liberal		21,501	36.2	+0.8
Greens		7,789	13.1	−0.9
Tasmania First		1,369	2.3	+2.3
Democrats		699	1.2	+1.2
Independent	Bob Elliston	186	0.3	+0.3
Independent	Informal	103	0.2	−0.3
Group B		102	0.2	+0.2
Independent	Matthew D. Piscioneri	56	0.1	+0.1
Independent	Bob Campbell	44	0.1	+0.1
Independent	Gregory Broszczyk	39	0.1	+0.1

=== Franklin ===
1998 Tasmanian state election: Franklin
Party	Candidate	Votes	%	±%
Quota		9,811		
Labor	Paul Lennon (elected 2)	7,708	13.1	+2.0
Labor	Fran Bladel (elected 4)	7,032	11.9	−1.6
Labor	Paula Wriedt (elected 5)	6,022	10.2	+4.6
Labor	Neville Oliver	2,241	3.8	+3.8
Labor	Trevor Cordwell	1,720	2.9	+2.9
Labor	Lin Thorp	1,216	2.1	−0.5
Labor	Ken Langston	949	1.6	+1.6
Liberal	Peter Hodgman (elected 1)	12,030	20.4	+10.0
Liberal	Matt Smith (elected 3)	3,176	5.4	+5.4
Liberal	Martin McManus	3,019	5.1	+5.1
Liberal	Jane Shoobridge	2,113	3.6	+3.6
Liberal	Mark Ashton	1,421	2.4	+2.4
Greens	Mike Foley	3,988	6.8	+0.8
Greens	Louise Crossley	763	1.3	−0.7
Greens	Penny King	496	0.8	0.0
Greens	Marie Giblin	367	0.6	+0.1
Tasmania First	Don Burgess	750	1.3	+1.3
Tasmania First	David Jackson	427	0.7	+0.7
Tasmania First	Dallas Hoggett	393	0.7	+0.7
Tasmania First	Carol Reynolds	380	0.6	+0.6
Tasmania First	Wendy Hyde	319	0.5	+0.5
Democrats	Robert Bell	821	1.4	+1.4
Democrats	Peter Kreet	158	0.3	+0.3
Independent	Sue Clark	342	0.6	+0.6
Independent	Flora Fox	323	0.5	+0.5
Group D	Rhonda Cains	83	0.1	+0.1
Group D	Graeme Norris	62	0.1	+0.1
Group D	Therese Hunniford	54	0.1	+0.1
Total formal votes		58,864	96.3	+1.3
Informal votes		2,262	3.7	−1.5
Turnout		61,126	95.2	−1.0
Party total votes
Labor		26,880	45.7	+3.0
Liberal		21,759	37.0	+5.0
Greens		6,105	10.4	−0.3
Tasmania First		2,269	3.9	+3.9
Democrats		979	1.7	−2.0
Independent	Sue Clark	342	0.6	+0.6
Independent	Flora Fox	323	0.5	+0.5
Group D		199	0.3	+0.3

=== Lyons ===
1998 Tasmanian state election: Lyons
Party	Candidate	Votes	%	±%
Quota		10,281		
Labor	David Llewellyn (elected 2)	8,304	13.5	−2.4
Labor	Michael Polley (elected 3)	7,756	12.6	−0.5
Labor	Ken Bacon (elected 5)	6,213	10.1	+10.1
Labor	Lara Giddings	4,945	8.0	+4.5
Labor	Scott Wiggins	1,070	1.7	+1.7
Labor	Danial Rochford	474	0.8	+0.8
Liberal	Rene Hidding (elected 1)	6,896	11.2	+3.6
Liberal	Denise Swan (elected 4)	4,387	7.2	−0.9
Liberal	Bob Mainwaring	4,000	6.5	−2.3
Liberal	John Gee	3,514	5.7	+5.7
Liberal	Carmel Torenius	1,778	2.9	+2.9
Greens	Christine Milne	5,507	8.9	−0.8
Greens	Sonia Chirgwin	235	0.4	+0.4
Greens	Ted Field	201	0.3	+0.3
Greens	John Collins	144	0.2	+0.2
Greens	Neil Smith	138	0.2	+0.2
Tasmania First	Dave Pickford	2,036	3.3	+3.3
Tasmania First	Will Frank	1,238	2.0	+2.0
Tasmania First	Darryl Gerrity	1,182	1.9	+1.9
Tasmania First	M. Turner	869	1.4	+1.4
Tasmania First	Jack Kelly	797	1.3	+1.3
Total formal votes		61,684	96.2	+1.6
Informal votes		2,462	3.8	−1.6
Turnout		64,146	95.5	−0.8
Party total votes
Labor		28,762	46.6	+5.8
Liberal		20,575	33.4	−8.2
Greens		6,225	10.1	−1.3
Tasmania First		6,122	9.9	+9.9

== See also ==
- 1998 Tasmanian state election
- Candidates of the 1998 Tasmanian state election
- Members of the Tasmanian House of Assembly, 1998-2002
