= Members of the Tasmanian House of Assembly, 1992–1996 =

This is a list of members of the Tasmanian House of Assembly, elected at the 1992 state election:

Name	Party	Electorate	Years in office
Dr Julian Amos	Labor	Denison	1976–1986, 1992–1996
Michael Aird^{[2]}	Labor	Franklin	1979–1986, 1989–1995
Lance Armstrong	Greens	Bass	1989–1996
John Barker	Liberal	Denison	1987–1996
Gerry Bates^{[3]}	Greens	Franklin	1986–1995
Tony Benneworth	Liberal	Bass	1992–1998
John Beswick	Liberal	Bass	1979–1998
Fran Bladel	Labor	Franklin	1986–2002
Bill Bonde	Liberal	Braddon	1986–2002
Ian Braid^{[5]}	Liberal	Lyons	1969–1972, 1975–1995
Bob Brown^{[1]}	Greens	Denison	1983–1993
Carole Cains	Liberal	Braddon	1992–1996, 1997–1998
John Cleary	Liberal	Franklin	1979–1986, 1988–1998
Ron Cornish	Liberal	Braddon	1976–1998
Brian Davison	Liberal	Franklin	1990–1996
Michael Field	Labor	Braddon	1976–1997
Mike Foley^{[3]}	Greens	Franklin	1995–1998
Robin Gray^{[4]}	Liberal	Lyons	1976–1995
Ray Groom	Liberal	Denison	1986–2001
Roger Groom	Liberal	Braddon	1976–1997
Michael Hodgman	Liberal	Denison	1992–1998, 2001–2010
Peter Hodgman	Liberal	Franklin	1986–2001
Di Hollister	Greens	Braddon	1989–1998
Judy Jackson	Labor	Denison	1986–2006
Gill James	Labor	Bass	1976–1989, 1992–2002
Paul Lennon	Labor	Franklin	1990–2008
David Llewellyn	Labor	Lyons	1986–2010, 2014–2018
Frank Madill	Liberal	Bass	1986–2000
Bob Mainwaring	Liberal	Lyons	1986–1989, 1992–1998
Christine Milne	Greens	Lyons	1989–1998
Sue Napier	Liberal	Bass	1992–2010
Graeme Page	Liberal	Lyons	1976–1996
Peter Patmore	Labor	Bass	1984–2002
Michael Polley	Labor	Lyons	1972–2014
Peg Putt^{[1]}	Greens	Denison	1993–2008
Tony Rundle	Liberal	Braddon	1986–2002
John Sheppard^{[2]}	Labor	Franklin	1995–1996
Denise Swan^{[4]}	Liberal	Lyons	1995–2002
John White	Labor	Denison	1986–1998

^{1} Greens member Bob Brown resigned in early 1993 to contest a seat in the Australian House of Representatives at the 1993 federal election. Peg Putt was elected in the resulting countback on 26 February.
^{2} Labor member Michael Aird resigned in early 1995. John Sheppard was elected in the resulting countback on 10 April.
^{3} Greens member Gerry Bates resigned in early 1995. Mike Foley was elected in the resulting countback on 15 May.
^{4} Liberal member Robin Gray resigned in late 1995. Denise Swan was elected in the resulting countback on 15 December.
^{5} Liberal member Ian Braid resigned in late 1995. No countback was held due to the proximity of the next election.

== Distribution of seats ==
Electorate	Seats held
Bass	
Braddon	
Denison	
Franklin	
Lyons	

Australian Labor Party - 11 seats (31%)
Liberal Party of Australia - 19 seats (54%)
Tasmanian Greens - 5 seats (14%)
