= Members of the Tasmanian House of Assembly, 1986–1989 =

This is a list of members of the Tasmanian House of Assembly, elected at the 1986 state election:

Name	Party	Electorate	Years in office
Darrel Baldock^{[1]}	Labor	Lyons	1972–1987
John Barker^{[2]}	Liberal	Denison	1987–1996
Gerry Bates	Ind. Green	Franklin	1986–1995
Chris Batt^{[1]}	Labor	Lyons	1987–1989
Neil Batt	Labor	Denison	1969–1980, 1986–1989
John Beattie	Liberal	Franklin	1972–1989
John Bennett	Liberal	Denison	1986–1990
John Beswick	Liberal	Bass	1979–1998
Fran Bladel	Labor	Franklin	1986–2002
Bill Bonde	Liberal	Braddon	1986–2002
Ian Braid	Liberal	Lyons	1969–1972, 1975–1995
Bob Brown	Ind. Green	Denison	1983–1993
John Cleary^{[3]}	Liberal	Franklin	1979–1986, 1988–1998
Ron Cornish	Liberal	Braddon	1976–1998
Geoff Davis^{[2]}	Liberal/Independent	Denison	1982–1987
Nick Evers	Liberal	Franklin	1986–1990
Michael Field	Labor	Braddon	1976–1997
Robin Gray	Liberal	Lyons	1976–1995
Ray Groom	Liberal	Denison	1986–2001
Roger Groom	Liberal	Braddon	1976–1997
Peter Hodgman	Liberal	Franklin	1986–2001
Harry Holgate	Labor	Bass	1974–1992
Judy Jackson	Labor	Denison	1986–2006
Gill James	Labor	Bass	1976–1989, 1992–2002
David Llewellyn	Labor	Lyons	1986–2010, 2014–2018
Frank Madill	Liberal	Bass	1986–2000
Bob Mainwaring	Liberal	Lyons	1986–1989, 1992–1998
Graeme Page	Liberal	Lyons	1976–1996
Peter Patmore	Labor	Bass	1984–2002
Geoff Pearsall^{[3]}	Liberal	Franklin	1969–1988
Greg Peart	Labor	Braddon	1986–1989
Michael Polley	Labor	Lyons	1972–2014
Peter Rae	Liberal	Bass	1986–1989
Neil Robson	Liberal	Bass	1976–1992
Tony Rundle	Liberal	Braddon	1986–2002
Michael Weldon	Labor	Braddon	1979–1982, 1986–1992
John White	Labor	Denison	1986–1998
Ken Wriedt	Labor	Franklin	1982–1990

^{1} Labor member Darrel Baldock resigned on 30 June 1987 to take up a role as coach of St Kilda Football Club. Chris Batt was elected as his replacement on 14 July.
^{2} Liberal member Geoff Davis resigned from the Liberal Party on 8 July 1987, and from parliament on 17 September. John Barker was appointed as his replacement on 29 September.
^{3} Liberal member and Deputy Premier Geoff Pearsall resigned in late October 1988. John Cleary was appointed as his replacement on 14 November.
