= Members of the Tasmanian House of Assembly, 1998–2002 =

This is a list of members of the Tasmanian House of Assembly, elected at the 1998 state election:

| Name | Party | Electorate | Years in office |
|---|---|---|---|
| Hon Jim Bacon | Labor | Denison | 1996–2004 |
| Ken Bacon | Labor | Lyons | 1998–2005 |
| Brenton Best | Labor | Braddon | 1996–2014 |
| Hon Fran Bladel^{[4]} | Labor | Franklin | 1986–2002 |
| Hon Bill Bonde | Liberal | Braddon | 1986–2002 |
| Bob Cheek | Liberal | Denison | 1996–2002 |
| Jim Cox | Labor | Bass | 1989–1992, 1996–2010 |
| David Fry^{[1]} | Liberal | Bass | 2000–2002 |
| Bryan Green | Labor | Braddon | 1998–2017 |
| Hon Ray Groom^{[2]} | Liberal | Denison | 1986–2001 |
| Rene Hidding | Liberal | Lyons | 1996-2019 |
| Hon Michael Hodgman^{[2]} | Liberal | Denison | 1992–1998, 2001–2010 |
| Hon Peter Hodgman^{[3]} | Liberal | Franklin | 1986–2001 |
| Hon Judy Jackson | Labor | Denison | 1986–2006 |
| Hon Gill James | Labor | Bass | 1976–1989, 1992–2002 |
| Steve Kons | Labor | Braddon | 1998–2010 |
| Hon Paul Lennon | Labor | Franklin | 1990–2008 |
| Hon David Llewellyn | Labor | Lyons | 1986–2010, 2014–2018 |
| Hon Frank Madill^{[1]} | Liberal | Bass | 1986–2000 |
| Martin McManus^{[3]} | Liberal | Franklin | 2001–2002 |
| Hon Sue Napier | Liberal | Bass | 1992–2010 |
| Neville Oliver^{[4]} | Labor | Franklin | 2002 |
| Hon Peter Patmore | Labor | Bass | 1984–2002 |
| Hon Michael Polley | Labor | Lyons | 1972–2014 |
| Peg Putt | Greens | Denison | 1993–2008 |
| Hon Tony Rundle | Liberal | Braddon | 1982–2002 |
| Matt Smith | Liberal | Franklin | 1998–2002 |
| Hon Denise Swan | Liberal | Lyons | 1995–2002 |
| Hon Paula Wriedt | Labor | Franklin | 1996–2009 |

^{1} Liberal member Frank Madill resigned in early 2000. David Fry was elected as his replacement in February.
^{2} Liberal member Ray Groom resigned on 9 August 2001. Michael Hodgman was elected as his replacement on 21 August.
^{3} Liberal member Peter Hodgman resigned in 2001. Martin McManus was elected as his replacement on 19 October.
^{4} Labor member Fran Bladel resigned in 2002. Neville Oliver was elected as her replacement on 22 April.

== Distribution of seats ==
| Electorate | Seats held |
|---|---|
| Bass | |
| Braddon | |
| Denison | |
| Franklin | |
| Lyons | |

| Australian Labor Party – 14 seats (56%) |
| Liberal Party of Australia – 10 seats (40%) |
| Tasmanian Greens – 1 seat (4%) |
