= Results of the 1925 Tasmanian state election =

Tasmanian state election, 3 June 1925 House of Assembly << 1922–1928 >>
Enrolled voters	114,901				
Votes cast	77,281		Turnout	67.26%	+4.16%
Informal votes	1,714		Informal	2.22%	-0.41%
Summary of votes by party
Party	Primary votes	%	Swing	Seats	Change
Labor	36,631	48.47%	+11.73%	16	+ 4
Nationalist	21,932	29.02%	–11.93%	7	– 5
Liberal (Lee)	7,815	10.34%	+10.34%	4	+ 4
Independent Labor TAS	2,604	3.45%	+2.14%	0	± 0
Independent	6,585	8.71%	+1.70%	3	+ 2
Others			–13.98%	0	– 5
Total	75,567			30	

This is a list of House of Assembly results for the 1925 Tasmanian election.

== Results by division ==
=== Bass ===
1925 Tasmanian state election: Bass
Party	Candidate	Votes	%	±%
Quota		2,133		
Labor	Allan Guy (elected 1)	3,206	21.5	+7.7
Labor	George Becker (elected 2)	1,665	11.2	−1.8
Labor	Victor Shaw (elected 5)	1,269	8.5	+3.2
Labor	Harold Holmes	428	2.9	+2.9
Liberal	Claude James (elected 3)	2,008	13.4	+13.4
Liberal	James Newton (elected 4)	1,286	8.6	−3.0
Liberal	Leslie Procter	633	4.2	+4.2
Liberal	Robert Coplestone	202	1.4	+1.4
Liberal	William Rose	159	1.1	+1.1
Liberal	Luke Bryant	42	0.3	+0.3
Nationalist	Henry Thomson (elected 6)	1,032	6.9	−1.2
Nationalist	Robert Murphy	597	4.0	−2.1
Nationalist	George Pullen	289	1.9	+1.9
Nationalist	George Shields	286	1.9	+1.9
Nationalist	James Sullivan	61	0.4	+0.4
Independent Labor	Jens Jensen	1,319	8.8	+0.5
Independent	Alexander Marshall	448	3.0	−5.4
Total formal votes		14,930	98.2	+0.3
Informal votes		277	1.8	−0.3
Turnout		15,207	68.0	+6.7
Party total votes
Labor		6,568	44.0	+4.5
Liberal		4,330	29.0	+29.0
Nationalist		2,265	15.2	−30.9
Independent Labor	Jens Jensen	1,319	8.8	+0.5
Independent	Alexander Marshall	448	3.0	+3.0

=== Darwin ===
1925 Tasmanian state election: Darwin
Party	Candidate	Votes	%	±%
Quota		2,261		
Labor	James Belton (elected 1)	2,790	17.6	+6.9
Labor	Philip Kelly (elected 2)	2,585	16.3	+9.4
Labor	James Hurst (elected 4)	1,354	8.6	+1.3
Labor	Henry Lane	780	4.9	+4.9
Labor	Eliza Burnell	348	2.2	+2.2
Labor	William Treanor	291	1.8	+1.8
Nationalist	Frank Marriott (elected 3)	1,856	11.7	+2.7
Nationalist	Henry McFie (elected 6)	1,367	8.6	+8.6
Nationalist	Hubert Nichols	1,059	6.7	+6.7
Nationalist	Herbert Vertigan	565	3.6	+3.6
Nationalist	Harold Ireland	396	2.5	+2.5
Nationalist	David Jones	383	2.4	+2.4
Liberal	Edward Hobbs (elected 5)	1,366	8.6	0.0
Liberal	James Charleston	684	4.3	+4.3
Total formal votes		15,824	97.5	+0.1
Informal votes		408	2.5	−0.1
Turnout		16,232	70.5	+7.5
Party total votes
Labor		8,148	51.5	+8.0
Nationalist		5,626	35.6	+7.0
Liberal		2,050	13.0	+13.0

=== Denison ===
1925 Tasmanian state election: Denison
Party	Candidate	Votes	%	±%
Quota		2,381		
Labor	Charles Culley (elected 2)	1,835	11.0	+2.0
Labor	Robert Cosgrove (elected 3)	1,612	9.7	+2.1
Labor	Walter Woods (elected 4)	1,490	8.9	+8.9
Labor	John Cleary (elected 6)	1,208	7.3	−6.4
Labor	Enid Lyons	998	6.0	+6.0
Labor	Eric Ogilvie	922	5.5	+5.5
Labor	Charles Metz	167	1.0	+1.0
Nationalist	John Soundy (elected 1)	1,989	11.9	+11.9
Nationalist	Charles Grant	1,524	9.1	+0.3
Nationalist	John McPhee (elected 5)	1,436	8.6	−5.4
Nationalist	Leslie Payne	994	6.0	+3.3
Nationalist	Frederick Wilson	276	1.7	+1.7
Nationalist	William Jarvis	258	1.5	+1.5
Nationalist	William Hammond	205	1.2	+1.2
Independent Labor	Gerald Mahoney	1,285	7.7	+7.7
Independent	Edith Waterworth	462	2.8	−3.7
Total formal votes		16,661	97.9	+0.5
Informal votes		360	2.1	−0.5
Turnout		17,021	69.0	+2.8
Party total votes
Labor		8,232	49.4	+9.7
Nationalist		6,682	40.1	−12.3
Independent Labor	Gerald Mahoney	1,285	7.7	+7.7
Independent	Edith Waterworth	462	2.8	−3.7

=== Franklin ===
1925 Tasmanian state election: Franklin
Party	Candidate	Votes	%	±%
Quota		2,096		
Labor	Albert Ogilvie (elected 1)	4,130	28.2	+14.6
Labor	William Sheridan (elected 3)	992	6.8	+6.8
Labor	Benjamin Watkins (elected 4)	760	5.2	+1.1
Labor	Samuel Lyden	574	3.9	+3.9
Labor	John Lewis	514	3.5	+3.5
Labor	Douglas Thompson	247	1.7	+1.7
Labor	Winston Triffitt	244	1.7	+1.7
Nationalist	John Evans (elected 2)	2,187	14.9	+3.3
Nationalist	George Cummins	1,270	8.7	+0.6
Nationalist	Richard Johnson	297	2.0	+2.0
Independent	Peter Murdoch (elected 5)	1,277	8.7	+1.6
Independent	John Piggott (elected 6)	1,100	7.5	−1.4
Independent	Benjamin Pearsall	1,076	7.3	+1.8
Total formal votes		14,668	97.7	+0.6
Informal votes		338	2.3	−0.6
Turnout		15,006	63.9	+3.0
Party total votes
Labor		7,461	50.9	+18.7
Nationalist		3,754	25.6	−12.5
Independent	Peter Murdoch	1,277	8.7	+8.7
Independent	John Piggott	1,100	7.5	+7.5
Independent	Benjamin Pearsall	1,076	7.3	+7.3

=== Wilmot ===
1925 Tasmanian state election: Wilmot
Party	Candidate	Votes	%	±%
Quota		1,927		
Labor	Joseph Lyons (elected 1)	4,125	30.6	+12.9
Labor	Michael O'Keefe (elected 2)	1,037	7.7	−0.1
Labor	Herbert Osborne	328	2.4	+2.4
Labor	William Shoobridge (elected 5)	283	2.1	+2.1
Labor	Will Reece	252	1.9	+1.9
Labor	John Palamountain	197	1.5	+1.5
Nationalist	Neil Campbell (elected 3)	1,499	11.1	+3.4
Nationalist	Percy Best	828	6.1	+6.1
Nationalist	Albert Bendall	700	5.2	+5.2
Nationalist	Ernest Blyth	578	4.3	+4.3
Independent	Norman Cameron (elected 4)	1,511	11.2	+2.8
Liberal	Walter Lee (elected 6)	1,325	9.8	−2.6
Liberal	John Peters	110	0.8	+0.8
Independent	John Newman	711	5.3	+5.3
Total formal votes		13,484	97.6	+0.8
Informal votes		331	2.4	−0.8
Turnout		13,815	64.6	+1.1
Party total votes
Labor		6,222	46.1	+18.7
Nationalist		3,605	26.7	−11.6
Independent	Norman Cameron	1,511	11.2	+2.8
Liberal		1,435	10.6	+10.6
Independent	John Newman	711	5.3	+5.3

== See also ==
- 1925 Tasmanian state election
- Members of the Tasmanian House of Assembly, 1925–1928
- Candidates of the 1925 Tasmanian state election
