= Candidates of the 1925 Tasmanian state election =

The 1925 Tasmanian state election was held on 3 June 1925. Since the last election, the Nationalist Party had split, with some supporting former leader Sir Walter Lee's "Liberal" grouping. The Tasmanian branch of the Country Party had also ceased to exist, with its members scattering to the Nationalists, Liberals or independents.

== Retiring Members ==
=== Nationalist ===
These members were elected in 1922 as members of the Nationalist or Country parties; their designation for 1925 (Nationalist, Liberal or Independent) is not clear.

- Richard Franks MHA (Darwin)
- Alexander Hean MHA (Franklin)

== House of Assembly ==
Sitting members are shown in bold text. Tickets that elected at least one MHA are highlighted in the relevant colour. Successful candidates are indicated by an asterisk (*).

=== Bass ===
Six seats were up for election. The Labor Party was defending three seats. The Nationalist Party was defending three seats, although one sitting member ran as a Liberal and another as an independent. Independent Labor MHA Jens Jensen was defending one seat.

Labor candidates	Nationalist candidates	Liberal candidates	Independent candidates
**George Becker***; **Allan Guy***; Harold Holmes; Victor Shaw*	Robert Murphy; George Pullen; **George Shields**; James Sullivan; Henry Thomson*	Luke Bryant; Robert Coplestone; Claude James*; **James Newton***; Leslie Procter; William Rose	**Jens Jensen** (Ind Lab); **Alexander Marshall**

=== Darwin ===
Six seats were up for election. The Labor Party was defending three seats. The Nationalist Party was defending three seats, two of which had been won by the Country Party at the last election.

Labor candidates	Nationalist candidates	Liberal candidates
**James Belton***; Eliza Burnell; **James Hurst***; **Philip Kelly***; Henry Lane; William Treanor	Harold Ireland; David Jones; **Frank Marriott***; Henry McFie*; Hubert Nichols; Herbert Vertigan	James Charleston; **Edward Hobbs***

=== Denison ===
Six seats were up for election. The Labor Party was defending three seats. The Nationalist Party was defending three seats.

Labor candidates	Nationalist candidates	Independent candidates
**John Cleary***; Robert Cosgrove*; **Charles Culley***; Enid Lyons; Charles Metz; Eric Ogilvie; Walter Woods*	**Charles Grant**; William Hammond; William Jarvis; **John McPhee***; **Leslie Payne**; John Soundy*; Frederick Wilson	Gerald Mahoney (Ind Lab); Edith Waterworth

=== Franklin ===
Six seats were up for election. The Labor Party was defending two seats. The Nationalist Party was defending three seats, although Nationalist MHA Peter Murdoch was running as an independent. Country Party MHA John Piggott was also running as an independent.

Labor candidates	Nationalist candidates	Independent candidates
John Lewis; Samuel Lyden; **Albert Ogilvie***; **William Sheridan***; Douglas Thompson; Winston Triffitt; Benjamin Watkins*	George Cummins; **John Evans***; Richard Johnson	**Peter Murdoch***; Benjamin Pearsall; **John Piggott***

=== Wilmot ===
Six seats were up for election. The Labor Party was defending two seats. The Nationalist Party was defending four seats, two of which had been held by the Country Party.

Labor candidates	Nationalist candidates	Liberal candidates	Independent candidates
**Joseph Lyons***; **Michael O'Keefe***; Herbert Osborne; John Palamountain; Will Reece; **William Shoobridge***	**Albert Bendall**; Percy Best; **Ernest Blyth**; **Neil Campbell***	**Sir Walter Lee***; John Peters	Norman Cameron*; John Newman

== See also ==
- Members of the Tasmanian House of Assembly, 1922–1925
- Members of the Tasmanian House of Assembly, 1925–1928
