= Nick Evers =

Australian politician

The Honourable Nick Evers

Member of the Tasmanian House of Assembly for Franklin
- In office 8 February 1986 – 23 July 1990

Personal details
- Born: Nicholas Clive Kurt Evers; 1 November 1937 Wynyard, Tasmania, Australia
- Died: 27 July 2013 (aged 75) Launceston, Tasmania, Australia
- Party: Liberal Party
- Education: University of Tasmania

Nicholas Clive Kurt Evers (1 November 1937 – 27 July 2013) was an Australian politician.

== Early life and career ==
Born in Wynyard, Tasmania, Evers held a Bachelor of Arts (Hons) from the University of Tasmania.

Evers joined the diplomatic service of the Department of External Affairs, and was posted in Ghana and Korea. In the early 1970s, he was a deputy general manager at the Australian Tourism Commission. Prior to entering politics, he was the head of the Department of Premier and Cabinet in Tasmania.

== Political career ==
In 1986, Evers was head-hunted by the Premier of Tasmania, Robin Gray, who asked him to run for Parliament at that year's state election. He was one of several high-profile individuals, dubbed the "magnificent seven", who were personally selected by Gray for their expertise and vision, and who he hoped would replace Liberal Party "drones" in the parliament. When Gray won the election, Evers who had won a seat in Franklin, was immediately appointed to his cabinet as Minister for Transport, Primary Industry and Public Administration. In 1988, he was made Minister for Tourism in addition to his other portfolios. On 1 June 1989, Robin Gray formed a ministry in which Evers was Minister for Industrial Relations, and Labour and Industry, however Gray's minority government was dissolved by the Governor of Tasmania, who then commissioned Michael Field as Premier with the support of five Green Independents under the Labor–Green Accord.

Evers resigned from parliament on 23 July 1990, citing a "lack of privacy and low pay".

== After politics ==
After leaving state politics, Evers was the chairman of the Spirit of Tasmania, which operate the Bass Strait ferry service between Tasmania and the mainland. In 1999, he was appointed chairman of the Australian Tourism Commission (ATC). He resigned in 2004 when the ATC was merged into Tourism Australia.

== Illness and death ==
Evers died following a long illness on 27 July 2013, aged 75, at a nursing home in Launceston. He was survived by his wife and two children.

Political offices
Preceded by John Beswick	Minister for Primary Industry; 1986–1989	Succeeded by Ian Braid
Preceded by Roger Groom	Minister for Transport; 1986–1989	Succeeded by Ken Wriedt
Preceded by Roger Groom	Minister for Public Administration; 1986–1989	Succeeded by Michael Field
Preceded by Geoff Pearsall	Minister for Tourism; 1988–1989	Succeeded by Harry Holgate
Preceded by John Beswick	Minister for Labour and Industry; 1989	Succeeded by Michael Aird as Minister for Employment, Industrial Relations and Training
Preceded by Peter Rae	Minister for Industrial Relations; 1989	Succeeded by Michael Aird as Minister for Employment, Industrial Relations and Training
