= Eric Barnard (politician) =

Australian politician

Eric Barnard AM

Member of the Tasmanian House of Assembly for Franklin
- In office 2 May 1959 – 7 August 1979
- Succeeded by: Bill McKinnon

Personal details
- Born: 13 July 1924 Mole Creek, Tasmania, Australia
- Died: 21 April 2017 (aged 92) Margaret River, Western Australia

Military service
- Allegiance: Australia
- Branch/service: Royal Australian Navy
- Years of service: 1942–1946

Eric Walter Barnard AM (13 July 1924 – 21 April 2017) was an Australian politician.

Barnard was born in Mole Creek, Tasmania. He was the nephew of Claude Barnard and the cousin of Lance Barnard, also politicians.

He joined the Royal Australian Navy on 29 June 1942, training at HMAS Cerberus then did radar plot training at HMAS Rushcutter in Sydney. He had further training in HMAS Quiberon and HMAS Napier, and served in HMAS Quickmatch from July 1943. He served in HMAS Shropshire from April 1945 until his discharge on 1 March 1946.

In 1959 he was elected to the Tasmanian House of Assembly as a Labor member for Franklin. He served as Speaker from 1972 to 1975 and as Minister for Primary Industry from 1975 to 1979, when he resigned his seat and left politics.

He was made a Member of the Order of Australia (AM) in 1980. In 2001, he was awarded the Centenary Medal in honour of his service to the community.
