= Labor–Green Accord =

Political agreement in Tasmania, Australia

Labor–Greens Accord Tasmanian Parliamentary Accord (Confidence and Supply Agreement)
- Labor leader: Michael Field
- Greens leader: Bob Brown
- Founded: 29 May 1989; 37 years ago
- Dissolved: 1 October 1990; 36 years ago
- Member parties: Tasmanian Labor Party; Green Independents
- Legislative Assembly: 18 / 35

The Labor–Green Accord was a 1989 political agreement between the Labor Party and the Tasmanian Greens (then called the Green Independents) to form government in the Australian state of Tasmania after the 1989 general election had resulted in a hung parliament.

== 1989 Tasmanian election ==
The election took place on 13 May 1989. Tasmanian elections use the Hare-Clark proportional method of single transferable votes, and in 1989 the Tasmanian House of Assembly (the lower house of the Parliament of Tasmania) consisted of 35 seats—seven members from each of Tasmania's five electorates.

The Liberal Party led by Premier Robin Gray suffered a two-seat swing, leaving them with 17 seats, one short of a majority. Labor (led by Michael Field) won 13. The Green Independents won 5 seats, giving them the balance of power in the parliament.

The five Green MPs and their electorates were Dr Bob Brown (Denison), Christine Milne (Lyons), Dr Gerry Bates (Franklin), Lance Armstrong (Bass) and Di Hollister (Braddon).

Labor–Green Accord
Tasmanian Parliamentary Accord
- Type: Confidence and supply agreement
- Context: Hung parliament following the 1989 Tasmanian state election
- Signed: 29 May 1989
- Location: Tasmania
- Effective: 1 June 1989
- Expiration: 1 October 1990
- Signatories: Michael Field (Labor leader); Bob Brown (Greens leader); Gerry Bates; Christine Milne; Lance Armstrong; Di Hollister
- Parties: Parliamentary Labor Party; Green Independents
- Language: English
- Text of the agreement

On 29 May 1989 the results of the general election were officially declared. On the same day the Tasmanian Parliamentary Accord was signed by Michael Field, Leader of the Opposition, and Bob Brown, a member for Denison. Field submitted the Accord to the Governor of Tasmania, Sir Phillip Bennett, in support of a proposition that the Governor should commission a Labor-led minority. The Governor declined Field's proposal and a new minority government with Gray as Premier was sworn in on 1 June.

Gray's public position in the immediate aftermath of the election was that he would resign if he lost a vote of no-confidence when Parliament resumed. However, he was quickly persuaded by a colleague and advisers that he might have the option of a new election. During June the proposal for a new election was developed and supportive advice obtained from a number of eminent constitutional lawyers. On 27 June, with Parliament set to convene the following day, Gray had a discussion with the Governor in which he indicated he intended to tender advice recommending a new election in the event that he lost a motion of no-confidence. The Governor, who had sought independent legal opinions, indicated he would be unlikely to accept the advice were it to be proffered.

When Parliament convened on 28 June 1989, a Labor Speaker was appointed — a sure sign the government was unlikely to control the floor of the House. Subsequently, a motion of no-confidence in Gray's government was put and carried in the early hours of 29 June. Later that day, after the Governor held discussions with Field and each of the five Greens, Gray resigned and advised the appointment of Field as Premier.

== Edmund Rouse bribery scandal ==
The formation of the Labor–Green alliance resulted in one of the biggest scandals in Tasmanian political history. Launceston businessman Edmund Rouse was the managing director of ENT Limited, Tasmania's largest media company. Returning to Tasmania from an overseas trip shortly after the election, Rouse was dismayed to find the Greens in a position of power in government, and was determined to take on what he saw as a grave threat to the Tasmanian and Australian economies. In particular, Rouse was concerned with the effect on the Tasmanian timber company Gunns, of which he was chairman, and which he thought stood to lose between $10 million and $15 million as a result of the Greens' environmental policies.

Using a former employee, Tony Aloi, as an intermediary, Rouse offered Labor MP Jim Cox A$110,000 to cross the floor and vote with the Liberals to defeat the presumed motion of no confidence against Gray when parliament resumed. Cox informed Field of the offer, and the call was dismissed as a hoax until an instalment of $5,000 arrived at Cox's home. Cox reported the bribery attempt to Tasmania Police, who placed a tap on his phone and arrested Aloi on 23 June as he called Cox from a telephone box.

Rouse was arrested several days later, after Aloi revealed his role in the affair. Rouse was charged with attempted bribery, and sentenced to three years in prison, of which he served eighteen months. Aloi was sentenced to twelve months prison, with eight months suspended sentence.

A Royal Commission (Royal Commission into an Attempt to Bribe a Member of the House of Assembly) was held in 1991, which attempted to determine the involvement of Robin Gray in the affair. Gray was cleared of involvement in the bribe attempt, as no connection between him and Rouse was established, although he had met with Rouse shortly before the bribe was offered and discussed a possible Labor defector. Gray's conduct was criticised by the commission, however, and his political career and reputation were tarnished.

== Environmental concessions ==
In return for the promise of stable government, the Parliamentary Accord committed both parties to work towards common objectives, balancing broad changes to environmental management policies with Tasmania's economic and employment concerns. Several environmental and social policies requested by the Greens were implemented, including:

- a moratorium on logging in National Estate areas not already approved
- a limit on the state's woodchip export quota
- ending the attempts to build a pulp mill at Wesley Vale, and closure of a chip mill in the Huon
- freedom of information legislation

== Collapse of the accord ==
The Greens terminated the accord after 409 days on 1 October 1990, when the state cabinet announced its adoption of the Federal Government's Forests and Forest Industry Strategy (FFIS), however an election was not required until 1992. The accord was never considered a coalition government, as the Green MPs had no ministerial responsibilities, and as such had no say in the adoption of the forestry policy.

Michael Field and Christine Milne spoke about the breakdown of the accord to the ABC program Stateline in 2006. Field compared the relationship between Labor and the Greens to a "forced marriage" which ended in a "very acrimonious divorce". Milne stated:

"What destroyed the Labor-Green Accord was the betrayal of the Greens by the Labor Party over resource security legislation."

== After the accord ==
After the breakdown of the accord, an election was called for 1 February 1992. Although the Greens retained all of their five seats, Labor lost two seats to the Liberals, led by Ray Groom, who now had a majority.

The next election in 1996 saw Labor regain three seats and the Greens lose one. Ray Groom, who had promised before the election to only govern with a majority, resigned and handed the leadership to Tony Rundle, who formed a loose alliance with the Greens to govern in a minority until 1998, when the major parties voted to restructure the House of Assembly (from 35 to 25 seats) in an (ultimately, unsuccessful) attempt to make it more difficult for minor parties to be elected. Rundle immediately called an election, which Labor won comfortably, leaving the Greens with only one seat.

Christine Milne led the Tasmanian Greens from 1993, when Bob Brown left to make an unsuccessful bid for the Federal House of Representatives. He was elected as a Senator in 1996, and Milne followed him to become a Senator in 2004.

== See also ==
- Labor–Greens coalition, political alliance in Canberra that lasted from 2012 to 2024
