= Bill McKinnon (politician) =

Australian politician

William Gillies McKinnon (born 24 January 1933) is a former Australian politician.

He was born in Barrhead, Scotland. In 1977 he was elected to the Tasmanian House of Assembly as a Labor member for Franklin in a recount following Bill Neilson's resignation. Defeated in 1979, he returned later that year in the recount that followed Eric Barnard's resignation. He was defeated in 1986.
