= Stanley Gough =

Australian politician

Stanley William Gough MBE (7 January 1914 – 30 January 1991) was an Australian politician.

He was elected to the Tasmanian House of Assembly in 1969 as a Liberal member for Franklin. He was defeated at the next election in 1972. Gough was awarded an MBE in 1986.
