= Greg Peart =

Australian politician

Gregory John Peart (born 18 March 1946) is a former Australian politician. He was born in Burnie, Tasmania and holds a Bachelor of Arts, a Bachelor of Education and a Diploma of Education. At the 1986 state election, he was elected to the Tasmanian House of Assembly as a Labor member for Braddon. He held the seat until his defeat in 1989.
