= HMAS Rushcutter =

Two units of the Royal Australian Navy (RAN) have been named HMAS Rushcutter, for Rushcutters Bay, Sydney.

- HMAS Rushcutter (naval base), a depot and training base originally operated as the headquarters of the New South Wales colonial navy, and later operating under this name from 1940 to 1979, when the land was granted to the public.
- HMAS Rushcutter (ML 1321), a former Harbour Defence Motor Launch used as a training vessel.
- HMAS Rushcutter (M 80), the lead ship of the Bay-class minehunting catamarans, which was launched in 1986 and decommissioned in 2001.
