= Lance Armstrong (politician) =

Australian politician (1940–2023)

The Reverend Lance Armstrong

Member of the Tasmanian House of Assembly for Bass
- In office 13 May 1989 – 24 February 1996

Personal details
- Born: Lance John Edward Armstrong; 17 February 1940 Perth, Western Australia, Australia
- Died: 14 October 2023 (aged 83) Melbourne, Victoria, Australia
- Party: Tasmanian Greens
- Occupation: Christian minister, politician

Lance John Edward Armstrong (17 February 1940 – 14 October 2023) was an Australian politician. Born in Perth, Western Australia, he was active in Tasmania and subsequently as a minister with the Uniting Church in Albury.

== Political career ==
Armstrong chose to stand for Parliament at the 1989 Tasmanian state election in Bass following an invitation by Bob Brown, who had been the first Australian parliamentary representative of what would later be known as the Greens. Armstrong was motivated to accept Brown's invitation due to a number of factors, including unabated exploitation of the Tasmanian natural environment for the benefit of multinational corporations, tactics of the Robin Gray government, and abusive language being used in the Tasmanian Parliament. In regards to the latter concern, Armstrong stated that a strong motivator in him choosing to contest was language used to describe Christine Milne after she first considered standing for election, with a member using parliamentary privilege to label Milne a "parliamentary prostitute".

Armstrong was successful in being elected, and sat alongside Brown, Milne, Di Hollister, and Gerry Bates as independents in the Tasmanian parliament. An attempt by the Gray government to fast-track legislation to build a pulp mill at Wesley Vale, in Armstrong's electorate of Bass, contributed in bringing environmental issues to the forefront of the election campaign. Following the election, the five independents began to use the moniker of 'Green Independents', which had been used by media throughout the election campaign in reference to them.

The Green Independents held the balance of power, with 17 Liberal members and 13 Labor members in the 35-member House of Assembly. Following a decision by the Liberal Party to reject negotiations, the Green Independents were left with two choices — make an agreement with the Labor Party, or remain on the crossbenches. Ultimately, the decision was made to sign the Labor–Green Accord, installing Michael Field of Labor as Premier.

The state election of 1992 saw all five sitting Greens re-elected, but with a drop in their vote of around 25% and with a majority Liberal government in power. After the election, these independents were reconstituted as the Tasmanian Greens. However, they still operated akin to independents, as the Tasmanian Greens had adopted the policy of allowing parliamentary members a "conscience vote" on all issues.

In April, Armstrong introduced a bill to restrict advertising and display of publications. This bill was aimed at the display of publications such as People and Playboy in newsagents, which Armstrong argued were degrading to women, although magazine Green Left Weekly argued that "Armstrong's censorship legislation is likely to increase the climate of repressiveness around sexuality".

At the 1996 election, four Greens were returned and the Greens achieved the balance of power with a Liberal minority government, but Armstrong lost his seat of Bass.

== After politics ==
Armstrong served as a Uniting Church minister in Albury-Wodonga.

In 2008, he controversially distributed a flyer urging residents not to vote for Henk van de Ven in Albury's local government elections, accusing van de Ven of "forceful and belligerent behaviour" in relation to an occasional child-care centre being built on council parkland.

== Death ==
Armstrong died at a Melbourne nursing home on 14 October 2023, at the age of 83. He was survived by his wife Ruth, three children, four grandchildren and two great-grandchildren.

Upon his death, former parliamentary colleague Bob Brown stated: "He made a remarkable contribution to Tasmanian politics and society. He seamlessly combined his Christian beliefs with his political career in his never-wavering advocacy for social justice, peace and care for the natural environment."

The Tasmanian Parliament moved a condolence motion for Armstrong on 19 October 2023.
