= Secessionism in Tasmania =

Political movements to take the island out of the Australian federation

Location of Tasmania in Australia

Secessionism in Tasmania has been proposed several times throughout Tasmania's history.

== Pre-federation ==
Before Federation, there was a lot of support for Tasmania joining the Commonwealth, though there was some opposition. The opposition argued that Federation would cause financial devastation to Tasmania, which obtained much of its revenue from customs and excise.

Most prominently among those who were concerned about Tasmania's future in the proposed federation was state statistician R. M. Johnston, who was supported by the Tasmanian attorney-general, Andrew Inglis Clark, and Nicholas John Brown, speaker of the Tasmanian House of Assembly. Tasmanian delegates to the Australian Constitutional Conventions successfully advocated for section 87 and section 96 to be included in the Australian Constitution.

== Early 1920s ==
After federation, Tasmania lost much of its revenue due to the free trade provisions of the Australian Constitution, and was constantly dependent on grants from the Commonwealth to maintain itself (though it also gained revenue from its state lottery, which was popular in other states).

This frustration began turning into calls for independence in the 1920s, which were supported by the Hobart Chamber of Commerce, and the Mercury newspaper - in 1922, the Mercury called for the "complete dissolution of the Federation".

In 1925, the Tasmanian rights league was formed, which advocated for "Justice for Tasmania or Secession", and by 1926, it delivered a petition to the Federal Parliament signed by 10429 Tasmanian voters demanding that the Commonwealth make various changes to help Tasmania.

== 1928–1930s ==
Starting around 1928, popular support for Tasmanian secession grew significantly. Among the supporters of the anti-federal movement were the Tasmanian shipping committee, the primary producers association of Tasmania and the Tasmanian economic society. In 1930, a Tasmanian branch of the Dominion League (a Western Australian secessionist organisation) was formed, which aimed for a secession referendum, though some thought that this was unrealistic. and the women's non-party league of Tasmania gave support to the anti-federalists.

In 1928, Thomas Murdoch introduced a motion into the Tasmanian Legislative Council calling for Tasmania's secession from the Commonwealth, although it was ultimately defeated.

After the appointment of the Commonwealth Grants Commission in 1933, the Commission produced a report recommending that Tasmania receive £A 290,000 in 1934–35, equivalent to A$31.7 million in 2022, which significantly reduced the Tasmanian demands for secession.

== 1980s ==
In the 1980s, Labor Party Premier Doug Lowe said that independence might have been considered. Later, the Liberal Party Premier Robin Gray proposed more self-government.

== Post-1990s ==
In the 1990s, the now-defunct First Party of Tasmania was formed, which aimed for Tasmanian secession.

== See also ==
- Secessionism in Western Australia
