= John Sheppard (Australian politician) =

Australian politician

John Charles Sheppard (born 12 July 1952) is a former Australian politician. He was born in Hobart, Tasmania, and holds a Bachelor of Education. In 1995, he was elected to the Tasmanian House of Assembly representing Franklin for the Labor Party, following a countback proceeding from the resignation of Michael Aird. Sheppard was defeated in 1996.
