= Tasmania First Party =

Australian political party

The Tasmania First Party is a minor Australian political party which operates exclusively in the state of Tasmania. The party was begun by members of the Tasmanian Firearms Owners Association in response to the Howard government's 1996 National Firearms Agreement, which the party called a "unilateral imposition of unnecessarily restrictive firearm legislation, following the unique tragedy of Martin Bryant's Port Arthur protest[sic]."

Tasmania First contested its first election in August 1998, the Tasmanian state election. The party received 5.1% of the primary vote for the House of Assembly but failed to win any seats. Tasmania First subsequently contested the Australian federal elections in 1998 and 2001, as well as Tasmanian state elections in 2002 and 2006, but its primary vote in these elections was very modest compared to the party's initial effort in 1998. The Australian Electoral Commission (AEC) deregistered Tasmania First as a registered political party on 28 April 2006, because the party had not contested a federal election in over four years(an AEC requirement, which must be met if parties are to retain their registration at the national level).

In August 1998, The Examiner of Launceston referred to Tasmania First as "a sort of local mirror image of One Nation". Tasmania First called this "defamatory" and demanded a retraction, threatening legal proceedings against the newspaper.

In 2001 the party declared itself "a natural partner to Brian Harradine in the Senate, where we have many policies in common, being a State based party with the interests of Tasmania our first priority."

Tasmania First fielded four candidates in the 2006 Tasmanian state election; one in Bass, one in Lyons, and two in Denison.

Note: The party should not be confused with the First Party of Tasmania, a minor political organisation whose policies include the secession of Tasmania from Australia.

== See also ==
- List of political parties in Australia
- Jacqui Lambie Network
