= Mike Foley (Australian politician) =

Australian politician (born 1946)

Member of the Tasmanian House of Assembly for Franklin
- In office 3 March 1995 – 29 August 1998
- Preceded by: Gerry Bates

Personal details
- Born: December 3, 1946 (age 79) Boronia, Victoria, Australia
- Party: Tasmanian Greens
- Occupation: Politician; environmental educator; wilderness guide

Michael Bernard Foley (born 3 December 1946) is a former Australian politician and member of the Tasmanian Greens.

Foley was born in Boronia, Victoria.

In 1995, he was elected to the Tasmanian House of Assembly for Franklin in a recount resulting from the resignation of Gerry Bates. He held the seat until his defeat in 1998.

After politics, Foley has been head of the Far South Wilderness Centre.
