= William Sheridan (politician) =

Australian politician

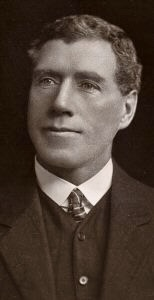
- William Sheridan M.H.A.
- Born: 12 March 1858; Galway
- Died: 6 November 1931 (aged 73); Hobart, Tasmania
- Occupation: Politician
- Spouse: Minerva Helene Eaves 1902
- Children: 1

William Sheridan (12 March 1858 – 16 November 1931) was an Australian politician. He was born in Galway, Ireland. Having moved to Tasmania, he was elected to the Tasmanian House of Assembly in 1909 as a Labor member for Denison. He was defeated in 1913 but returned in a recount following the death of John Davies in 1914. In 1925 he switched seats to contest Franklin, which he held until his defeat in 1928. Sheridan died in Hobart.

He moved to England when he was 17, and to Hobart in 1881, where he ran "The Nimble Shilling", a toy, china and fancy good shop, with Archibald Strang until 1885. By 1891 he was a storekeeper on the Macleay River and became secretary of the local branch of the Political Labor League. He moved to New Zealand and was in business in the Wairarapa and farming at Inglewood before moving to nearby Otakeho, where he again became a storekeeper. On 12 August 1902, at Wellington, he married Minerva Helene Eaves, of Surges Bay. In 1904 he sold the shop to his brother in law and visited England, before returning to Tasmania in 1908 and becoming a politician. He was Government whip and secretary to the parliamentary party (1924–25) and chairman of the Parliamentary Standing Committee on Public Works (1925–28). About 1928 he spent 18 months in England. He died at his home at Moonah and was survived by his widow and their son, Hubert, as well as his brother, Joseph Sheridan, and a sister, both in South Africa. Another sister died in Queensland a few weeks before him. He was buried at Cornelian Bay Cemetery.
