= David Fry (politician) =

Australian politician (born 1957)

David Mayburn Fry (born 19 November 1957) is an Australian former politician. Born in Manly, New South Wales, he moved to Tasmania and in 2000 was elected to the Tasmanian House of Assembly in a countback following the resignation of Bass MHA Frank Madill. A member of the Liberal Party, he served as party whip from 2001. In 2002, he was defeated by fellow Liberal Peter Gutwein. He ran again for Bass in 2006 but was unsuccessful.
