= Peter Murdoch (politician) =

Australian politician

Member of the Tasmanian House of Assembly

Personal details
- Born: 16 October 1865
- Died: 24 October 1948 (aged 83)
- Party: Nationalist Party (Australia) (1922-1925) Independent Party (Australia) (1925-1928)

Peter Murdoch (16 October 1865 – 24 October 1948) was an Australian politician. Born in Hobart, he was a member of the Tasmanian House of Assembly from 1922, when he was elected as a Nationalist member for Franklin. He left the Nationalist Party to become an independent in 1925 and was re-elected at that year's election, but he was defeated at the 1928 state election. After unsuccessfully contesting the 1929 by-election for the federal seat of Franklin, he retired from politics. Murdoch died in Hobart in 1948.
