= John Beattie (Australian politician) =

Australian politician (1932–2020)

John Maxwell Beattie (4 October 1932 – 12 May 2020) was an Australian politician. He was born in Melbourne, but later moved to Tasmania. At the 1972 state election, he was elected to the Tasmanian House of Assembly as a Liberal member for Franklin. He was Chair of Committees from 1982 to 1989 but did not hold ministerial office. Beattie retired in 1989.
