= Martin McManus (politician) =

Australian politician

Martin John McManus (16 November 1961 – 22 December 2025) was an Australian politician and teacher.

Born in Hobart, Tasmania, he trained first in electrical and industrial electronics. Later completing tertiary studies in teaching. He is the great-grandson of Edward Mulcahy, a long-serving Tasmanian Senator and MHA. On 19 October 2001, he was elected as a Liberal Member to the Tasmanian House of Assembly for the seat of Franklin in a recount caused by the resignation of Peter Hodgman. He was defeated for re-election in 2002—when both the leader and deputy leader of the Liberal Party also lost their seats.

McManus served as an alderman for the Clarence City Council, first elected in October 1996 and also as Deputy Mayor. He remained an elected member for the City of Clarence for 17 years, concluding in October 2014. Martin McManus is a graduate of both the University of Tasmania and the University of New South Wales.

He died on 22 December 2025.
