= 1986 Tasmanian state election =

State election in Australia

- 8 February 1986

All 35 seats to the House of Assembly 18 seats needed for a majority
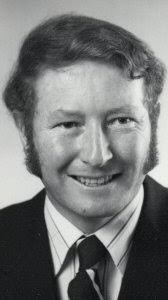

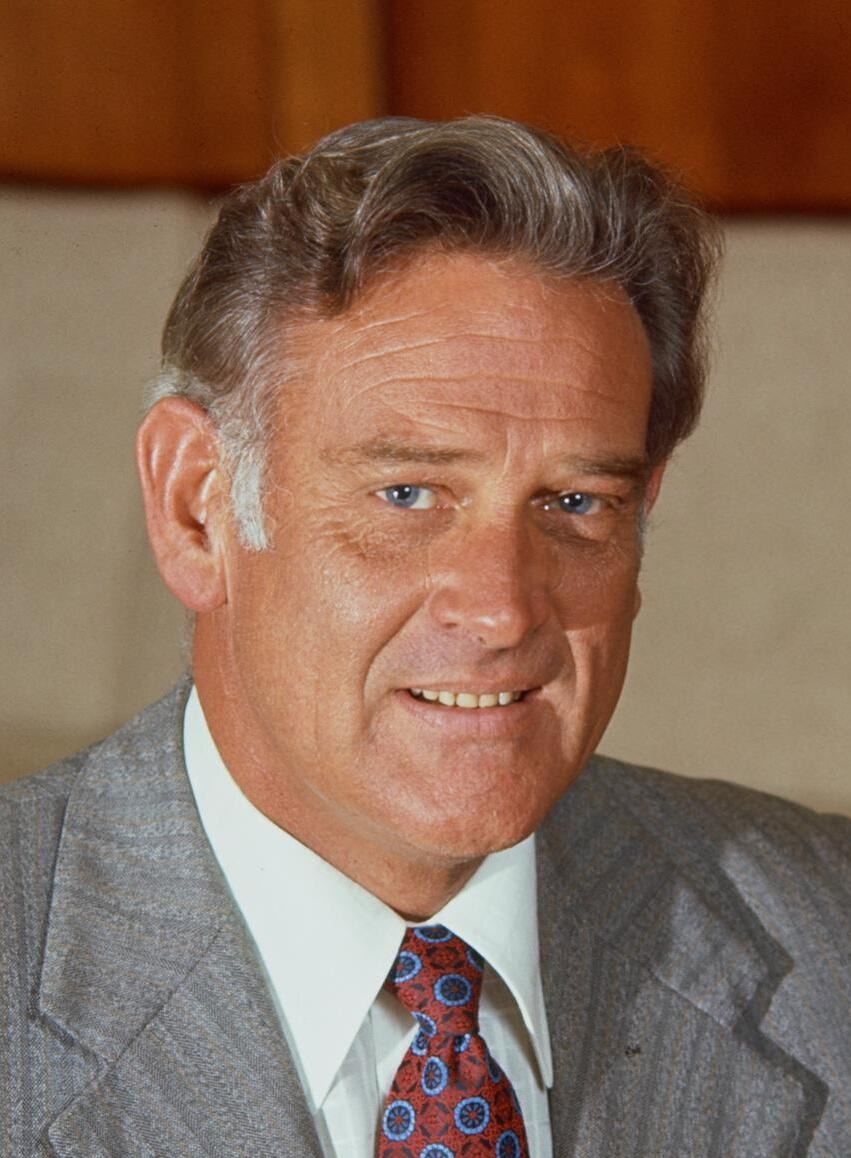

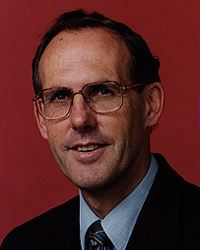
	First party	Second party	Third party
Leader	Robin Gray	Ken Wriedt	Bob Brown
Party	Liberal	Labor	Ind. Green
Leader since	10 November 1981	27 May 1982	1983
Leader's seat	Lyons	Franklin	Denison
Last election	19 seats	14 seats	0 seats
Seats won	19	14	2
Seat change	Steady	Steady	▲2
Percentage	54.2%	35.14%	5.55%
Swing	▲5.68	▼1.72	▲3.84
- Results of the election
Premier before election
Robin Gray
Liberal
Elected Premier
Robin Gray
Liberal

The 1986 Tasmanian state election was held on 8 February 1986 in the Australian state of Tasmania to elect 35 members of the Tasmanian House of Assembly. The election used the Hare-Clark proportional representation system — seven members were elected from each of five electorates. The quota required for election was 12.5% in each division.

The incumbent Liberal government headed by Robin Gray hoped to secure a second term in office. The Labor Party was headed by Ken Wriedt. The Green independents were headed by Bob Brown. The Australian Democrats contested the electorates of Braddon and Bass. Green candidates contested the electorates of Denison and Franklin.

Prior to the election the Liberals held 18 of the 35 seats in parliament. The Labor Party held 14, and there were three independents—former Labor Premier Doug Lowe, Green independent Bob Brown, and ex-Liberal MHA Gabriel Haros.

== Results ==
The representation of the Liberal and Labor parties remained unchanged after the election, at 19 and 14 respectively, leaving Robin Gray's Liberal government in power. It was the first time in 58 years that a non-Labor government had won a second term in Tasmania.

The Greens increased their representation from one to two, with Gerry Bates replacing independent Doug Lowe as the seventh member for the Division of Franklin (Lowe did not contest the election).

Party	Votes	%	+/–	Seats	+/–
Liberal	138,836	54.20	+5.68	19	Steady
Labor	90,003	35.14	-1.72	14	Steady
Ind. Green	14,227	5.55	+3.84	2	▲1
Independents	6,385	2.49	+0.50	0	Steady
Democrats	5,272	2.06	-3.33	0	Steady
Others	1,438	0.56	-4.97	0	▼1
Total	256,161	100.00	–	35	–
Valid votes	256,161	94.07			
Invalid/blank votes	16,145	5.93	+0.27		
Total votes	272,306	100.00	–		
Registered voters/turnout	290,277	93.81	+0.34		

== Distribution of votes ==
=== Primary vote by division ===
	Bass	Braddon	Denison	Franklin	Lyons
Labor Party	37.4%	34.1%	30.8%	36.5%	36.9%
Liberal Party	56.2%	60.1%	43.6%	51.6%	59.4%
Independent Greens	—	—	15.9%	11.9%	—
Other	6.4%	5.8%	9.7%	—	3.6%

=== Distribution of seats ===
Electorate	Seats won
Bass	
Braddon	
Denison	
Franklin	
Lyons	

Labor
Liberal
Ind. Green

== Aftermath ==
Shortly after the election, Ken Wreidt was replaced as Labor leader by Neil Batt.

== See also ==
- Members of the Tasmanian House of Assembly, 1986–1989
- Candidates of the 1986 Tasmanian state election
- Results of the Tasmanian state election, 1986
