= Neville Oliver =

Australian politician

Neville Laurence Oliver (born 11 November 1944) is a former Australian politician. Before entering politics, he was an ABC sports commentator. On 22 April 2002, he was elected to the Tasmanian House of Assembly as a Labor member representing Franklin in a recount following the resignation of Fran Bladel. Oliver represented the Labor Party. He was defeated for re-election on 30 July that year.

In his previous career as a sports commentator, he frequently covered Test cricket on radio as part of the BBC's Test Match Special team. Brian Johnston recalled in his stage act that as the commentators' roster only showed their initials, Oliver was listed as NO. Johnston told Oliver "From now on, I will call you 'the Doctor'" (after the James Bond villain Doctor No). According to Johnston, this nickname 'stuck' to the point that listeners believed Oliver was a real doctor, and it was not unknown for surgeries to telephone him to ask if he could act as a locum.
