= Matt Smith (Tasmanian politician) =

Australian politician

Member of the Tasmanian House of Assembly for Franklin
- In office 29 August 1998 – 20 July 2002

Personal details
- Born: Matthew John Smith; 22 March 1978 (age 48) Sydney, New South Wales, Australia
- Party: Liberal

Matthew John Smith (born 22 March 1978) is an Australian Liberal politician who served in the Tasmanian House of Assembly from 1998 to 2002.

Smith was elected to the Tasmanian House of Assembly in 1998 as a member for the seat of Franklin. He became the youngest member of any parliament in Australia upon election in 1998 at 20 years of age.

Smith stepped down shortly before the 2002 election after his father was charged with stealing from his employer and a court was told some of the money may have been used to fund his campaign. His father was later acquitted of all charges.
