= Gerry Bates =

Australian politician

Member of the Tasmanian House of Assembly for Franklin
- In office 8 February 1986 – 4 May 1995

Personal details
- Born: Gerard Maxwell Bates; 13 September 1950 (age 75) Lancashire, England, United Kingdom
- Party: Tasmanian Greens
- Education: University of Birmingham
- Profession: Environmental lawyer, legal academic

Gerard Maxwell Bates (born 13 September 1950) is an Australian environmental lawyer and academic, and former politician.

== Early life and education ==
Bates was born in Lancashire, England in 1950. He studied at the University of Birmingham where he qualified for a Bachelor of Laws (LLB)(Hons) and a PhD.

Bates went on to become a tutor at the University of Birmingham and a senior lecturer at Birmingham Polytechnic.

He later emigrated to Australia, and was a lecturer in environmental law at the University of Tasmania until Bob Brown convinced him to run for parliament as a Green Independent in 1986 Tasmanian state election.

== Political career ==
In 1986, he was elected to the Tasmanian House of Assembly for Franklin as an Independent Green. At the 1989 election, three other Greens were elected in addition to Brown and Bates (Lance Armstrong, Di Hollister and Christine Milne). The Greens held the balance of power, and agreed to give support to the Labor Party to form a minority government when they signed the Labor–Green Accord. In 1992, the five Independent Greens in the House formed the Tasmanian Greens.

Bates resigned from the House of Assembly on 4 May 1995 to contest Queenborough in the Legislative Council, but was unsuccessful.

== Academic career ==
Bates is an adjunct professor at the Sydney Law School, the law faculty of the University of Sydney. He is also an adjunct professor at the Australian Centre for Environmental Law (ACEL), part of the Australian National University.

Bates has been a member of the Board of the Environment Protection Authority of NSW since 1996, a member of the State of the Environment Advisory Council since 2004, and a Director of Kimbriki Environmental Enterprises, a regional waste recovery centre and landfill on Sydney's Northern Beaches, since 2006.

Bates is author of Environmental Law in Australia, Corporate Liability for Pollution" and "Pollution Law in Australia. He is also Editor of the Environment and Planning Law Journal.

Bates received a special award from the National Environmental Law Association in 1994 for Outstanding Contribution to Environmental Law.
