= John Beswick (politician) =

Australian politician (born 1937)

The Honourable John Beswick AM

Deputy Premier of Tasmania
- In office 18 February 1992 – 18 March 1996
- Premier: Ray Groom
- Preceded by: Peter Patmore
- Succeeded by: Sue Napier
- Constituency: Bass

Personal details
- Born: Richard John Beswick; 7 December 1937 (age 88) Derby, Tasmania, Australia
- Party: Liberal Party

Richard John Beswick AM (born 7 December 1937 in Derby, Tasmania) is a former Australian politician and Deputy Premier of Tasmania. In 1979, he was elected to the Tasmanian House of Assembly representing Bass for the Liberal Party. He was a minister from 1982 to 1989, and Deputy Premier from 1992 to 1996. He retired from politics in 1998.

At the 2015 Australia Day Honours, Beswick was appointed a Member of the Order of Australia for significant service to the Parliament of Tasmania, to social welfare and primary industries, to local government, and to the community. He was also awarded the Centenary Medal in 2001 for sustained and dedicated service to the local community and government.
