= Thomas John Cleary =

Australian politician

(Thomas) John Cleary (born 29 June 1947) is a former Australian politician. He was born in Launceston, Tasmania. In 1979, he was elected to the Tasmanian House of Assembly representing Franklin for the Liberal Party. He served as a minister from 1983 to 1986, when he was defeated; he was re-elected in 1988 and held the seat until his retirement in 1998. After leaving Tasmanian politics he spent a time as administrator of the Tiwi Islands while they were excised from Australian refugee status in 2003.
