= Bill Bonde =

Australian politician (born 1934)

The Honourable Bill Bonde

Member of the Tasmanian House of Assembly for Braddon
- In office 8 February 1986 – 20 July 2002

Personal details
- Born: Wilfred Bert Bonde; 3 October 1934 (age 91) Ulverstone, Tasmania
- Occupation: Politician

Wilfred Bert Bonde (born 3 October 1934) is a former Australian politician. Born in Ulverstone, Tasmania, he was elected to the Tasmanian House of Assembly in 1986 as a Liberal member for Braddon. He was a minister from 1996 to 1998. Bonde retired in 2002.
