= Frank Madill (Australian politician) =

Australian politician (born 1941)

The Honourable Frank Madill AM

Speaker of the Tasmanian House of Assembly
- In office 23 April 1996 – 5 October 1998
- Preceded by: Graeme Page
- Succeeded by: Michael Polley

Member of the Tasmanian House of Assembly for Bass
- In office 8 February 1986 – 1 March 2000

Personal details
- Born: Francis Leslie Madill; 5 September 1941 (age 85) Pakenham, Victoria, Australia
- Party: Liberal Party
- Education: University of Melbourne
- Occupation: Doctor
- Profession: General practitioner

Francis Leslie "Frank" Madill AM, FRACGP (born 5 September 1941) is an Australian medical doctor and former politician, who was a Liberal Party member of the Tasmanian House of Assembly from 1986 until 2000.

He graduated with Bachelor of Medicine and Bachelor of Surgery degrees from the University of Melbourne in 1965, relocating to Tasmania in 1966 and becoming a Fellow of the Royal Australian College of General Practitioners in 1972.

Madill first entered parliament in the 1986 Tasmanian election in the electorate of Bass. He became the Speaker of the House of Assembly on 23 April 1996, and held the position until 1998. On 1 March 2000 he resigned due to illness.

Following his resignation from parliament, Madill again took up general practice as a doctor. He published a number of autobiographical novels, including Why Politics Doctor? Politics: Warts and All. He currently lectures in Human Life Sciences at the University of Tasmania.

In the 2014 Australia Day Honours, Madill was made a Member of the Order of Australia (AM) for significant service to the Parliament of Tasmania, to medicine as a general practitioner, and to the community.
