= Peter Patmore =

Australian politician

The Honourable Peter Patmore AM

12th Deputy Premier of Tasmania
- In office 3 July 1989 – 17 February 1992
- Preceded by: Ray Groom
- Succeeded by: John Beswick

Member of the Tasmanian House of Assembly for Bass
- In office 15 August 1984 – 20 July 2002

Personal details
- Born: 5 November 1952 (age 73) Launceston, Tasmania, Australia
- Party: Labor
- Education: University of Tasmania (LLB, PhD); University of Cambridge (DipCrim)
- Profession: Barrister

Peter James Patmore AM (born 5 November 1952) is an Australian former politician. In 1984 he was elected to the Tasmanian House of Assembly as one of the members of Bass, representing the Labor Party. During that time he held the positions of; Deputy Premier, Attorney General, Minister for Justice, Minister for Industrial Relations, Minister for Consumer Affairs, and Minister for Education and the Arts. He resigned from parliament in 2002.

Patmore was awarded the Member of the Order of Australia (AM) in 2005 for services to the Tasmanian Parliament, particularly through the introduction of fiscal, education and law reforms.

His qualifications before entering parliament included a Bachelor of Law from the University of Tasmania and a Diploma of Criminology from Cambridge University. He received a PhD in Political Science in 2000. He is a barrister and solicitor, admitted to practice in the Supreme Court of Tasmania and the Federal Court of Australia in 1980.

Until 2017 Patmore lectured in law at the University of Tasmania. Patmore was Chairman of Poppy Advisory and Control Board and an Australian delegate to the United Nation Commission for Narcotic Drugs from 2002 to 2015.
