= Di Hollister =

Australian politician (born 1947)

Member of the Tasmanian House of Assembly for Braddon
- In office 13 May 1989 – 29 August 1998

Personal details
- Born: 9 December 1947 (age 78) Devonport, Tasmania
- Party: Tasmanian Greens
- Education: University of Tasmania
- Occupation: Teacher

Dianne Lesley Hollister (born 9 December 1947) is a former Australian politician.

== Early life ==
Born in Devonport, Tasmania, she started her career as a teacher.

== Political career ==
In 1989, she was elected to the Tasmanian House of Assembly for Braddon as an Independent Green. In 1992, the five Independent Greens formed the Tasmanian Greens. Hollister held her seat until she was defeated in 1998.
