= Fran Bladel =

Australian politician (1933–2023)

The Honourable Fran Bladel

Member of the Tasmanian House of Assembly for Franklin
- In office 8 February 1986 – 9 April 2002

Personal details
- Born: Frances Mary Payne; 3 October 1933 Hobart, Tasmania, Australia
- Died: 5 December 2023 (aged 90)
- Party: Labor Party
- Spouse: Erwin Bladel (m. 1954; died 1961)
- Education: University of Tasmania
- Occupation: Teacher

Frances Mary Bladel (3 October 1933 – 5 December 2023) was an Australian politician. She was a member of the Tasmanian House of Assembly from 1986 to 2002, representing the seat of Franklin for the Labor Party.

== Early life and teaching career ==
Born in Hobart, Tasmania, Bladel was raised in Moonah during the last years of the Great Depression. Her first job at the age of 15 was as a photographic assistant to a Russian portrait photographer. In 1954, she married young German immigrant Erwin Bladel, and they had a son, however, Erwin died when their child was three years old, leaving her as a widow and single mother. Bladel worked as a cleaner and barmaid to support them, then gained mature-age entry to the University of Tasmania where she graduated with a Bachelor of Arts with Honours and a Teacher Training Certificate. She commenced a career as a teacher, working at Rose Bay High School (Tasmania) and as a senior English teacher at Bridgewater High School.

Inspired by the Vietnam War to get involved in politics, Bladel joined the Australian Labor Party, and in 1978, co-authored a study which surveyed the electoral consequences of the limited number of female Labor MPs in Australian parliaments.

== Political career ==
In 1986, Bladel was elected to the Tasmanian House of Assembly as a Labor member for Franklin. In July 1989, she became a minister in the newly elected Labor government of Michael Field, as Minister Assisting the Premier on the Status of Women and Minister for Administrative Services. On 13 November 1989, Consumer Affairs was added to the Administrative Services portfolio, and on 8 February 1991 she was also made Minister for Construction.

In 1992, the Field Labor government was defeated by the Liberal Party. Bladel remained a member of the House of Assembly, and returned to the ministry when Labor regained office in 1998 as Secretary to Cabinet. From May 2000, she served as acting Minister of State Assisting the Premier, and from October 2001 to January 2002 was acting Minister for Education.

In 2002, she resigned her seat in the House of Assembly to contest the Legislative Council seat of Huon, where she was defeated. Her vacancy was filled by Neville Oliver in a countback, and Bladel retired from politics.

== Death ==
Fran Bladel died on 5 December 2023, at the age of 90.

== Recognition ==
In 2006 Bladel was inducted to the Tasmanian Honour Roll of Women for service to Government, Education and the Community.
