= Electoral results for the Division of Elwick =

This is a list of electoral results for the electoral division of Elwick in Tasmanian Legislative Council elections since 2005, when candidate political affiliations were first recorded in the official record.

== Members ==
Image	Member	Party	Term	Notes
	David Crean (b. 1950)	Labor	31 July 1999 – 2 May 2004	Retired due to kidney condition
	Terry Martin (b. 1957)	Labor	2 May 2004 – 2007	Charged in 2009 with having sex with a 12-year-old girl. Did not seek re-election; convicted in 2011
	Terry Martin (b. 1957)	Independent	2007 – 1 May 2010	Charged in 2009 with having sex with a 12-year-old girl. Did not seek re-election; convicted in 2011
	Adriana Taylor (b. 1946)	Independent	1 May 2010 – 7 May 2016	Former mayor of Glenorchy. Lost re-election
	Josh Willie (b. 1984)	Labor	7 May 2016 – 27 February 2024	Resigned to contest 2024 state election. Currently MHA for Clark
	Bec Thomas	Independent	4 May 2024 – present	Former mayor of Glenorchy. Incumbent

== Election results ==
=== 2024 ===
2024 Elwick state by-election
Party	Candidate	Votes	%	±%
Independent	Bec Thomas	6,208	33.93	+33.93
Labor	Tessa McLaughlin	5,194	28.39	–24.15
Greens	Janet Shelley	3,476	19.00	–2.06
Independent	Fabiano Cangelosi	3,417	18.66	+18.66
Total formal votes		18,295	95.73	–0.63
Informal votes		816	4.27	+0.63
Turnout		19,111	80.74	+2.71
Registered electors		23,669		
Two-candidate-preferred result
Independent	Bec Thomas	9,758	53.34	+53.34
Labor	Tessa McLaughlin	8,537	46.66	–5.88
Independent gain from Labor				

=== 2022 ===
2022 Tasmanian Legislative Council periodic elections: Elwick
Party	Candidate	Votes	%	±%
Labor	Josh Willie	9,450	52.54	+5.90
Independent	Rick Cazaly	4,750	26.41	+26.41
Greens	Hannah Bellamy	3,788	21.06	+8.86
Total formal votes		17,988	96.36	+1.42
Informal votes		680	3.64	−1.42
Turnout		18,668	78.03	−2.36
Registered electors		23,925		
Labor hold		Swing		

=== 2016 ===
Tasmanian Legislative Council periodic elections, 2016: Elwick
Party	Candidate	Votes	%	±%
Labor	Josh Willie	8,916	46.64	+8.67
Independent	Adriana Taylor	7,868	41.16	−7.73
Greens	Penelope Ann	2,332	12.20	−0.95
Total formal votes		19,116	94.94	−0.95
Informal votes		1,019	5.06	+0.95
Turnout		20,135	80.39	−0.73
Two-candidate-preferred result
Labor	Josh Willie	10,165	53.18	+9.26
Independent	Adriana Taylor	8,951	46.82	−9.26
Labor gain from Independent		Swing	+9.26	

=== 2010 ===
Tasmanian Legislative Council periodic elections, 2010: Elwick
Party	Candidate	Votes	%	±%
Independent	Adriana Taylor	9,598	48.88	+48.88
Labor	Tim Jacobson	7,455	37.97	+37.97
Greens	Kartika Franks	2,581	13.15	+13.15
Total formal votes		19,634	95.89	
Informal votes		842	4.11	
Turnout		20,476	81.19	
Two-party-preferred result
Independent	Adriana Taylor	11,011	56.08	+56.08
Labor	Tim Jacobson	8,623	43.92	+43.92
Independent hold		Swing		
