= Members of the Tasmanian Legislative Council, 2011–2017 =

This is a list of members of the Tasmanian Legislative Council between 2011 and 2017. Terms of the Legislative Council did not coincide with Legislative Assembly elections, and members served six year terms, with a number of members facing election each year.

== Elections ==
Date	Electorates
7 May 2011	Derwent (by-election); Launceston; Murchison; Rumney
5 May 2012	Hobart; Western Tiers
6 May 2013	Montgomery; Nelson; Pembroke
3 May 2014	Huon; Rosevears
2 May 2015	Derwent; Mersey; Windermere
7 May 2016	Apsley; Elwick

== Members ==
Name	Party	Division	Term in office	Elected
Hon Rosemary Armitage	Independent	Launceston	2011–present	2011
Hon Robert Armstrong	Independent	Huon	2014–2020	2014
Hon Ivan Dean	Independent	Windermere	2003–2021	2009
Hon Craig Farrell	Labor	Derwent	2011–present	b/e
Hon Kerry Finch	Independent	Rosevears	2002–2020	2014
Hon Ruth Forrest	Independent	Murchison	2005–present	2011
Hon Mike Gaffney	Independent	Mersey	2009–present	2009
Hon Dr Vanessa Goodwin	Liberal	Pembroke	2009–2017	b/e
Hon Greg Hall	Independent	Western Tiers	2001–2018	2012
Hon Paul Harriss^{[1]}	Independent	Huon	1996–2014	2008
Hon Leonie Hiscutt	Liberal	Montgomery	2013–present	2013
Hon Tony Mulder	Independent	Rumney	2011–2017	2011
Hon Doug Parkinson	Labor	Hobart	1994–2012	2006
Hon Tania Rattray	Independent	Apsley	2004–present	2010
Hon Sue Smith	Independent	Montgomery	1997–2013	2007
Hon Adriana Taylor	Independent	Elwick	2010–2016	2010
Hon Rob Valentine	Independent	Hobart	2012–2024	2012
Hon Jim Wilkinson	Independent	Nelson	1995–2019	2007
Hon Josh Willie	Labor	Elwick	2016–2024	2016

^{1} Independent MLC for Huon Paul Harriss resigned on 24 February 2014 in order to contest Franklin in the Tasmanian House of Assembly for the Liberal Party. As Huon was one of the seats due for election in 2014 regardless of the resignation, no by-election was held.

== See also ==
- Members of the Tasmanian Legislative Council, 2010–2014

== Sources ==
- Parliament of Tasmania (2006). The Parliament of Tasmania from 1856
