= Next Tasmanian state election =

- No later than mid-2029

All 35 seats in the House of Assembly 18 seats needed for a majority
- Opinion polls
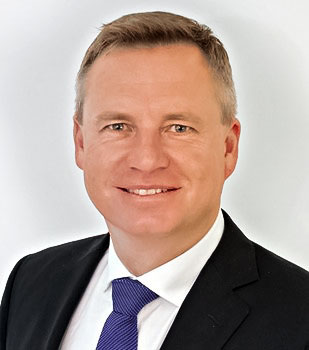

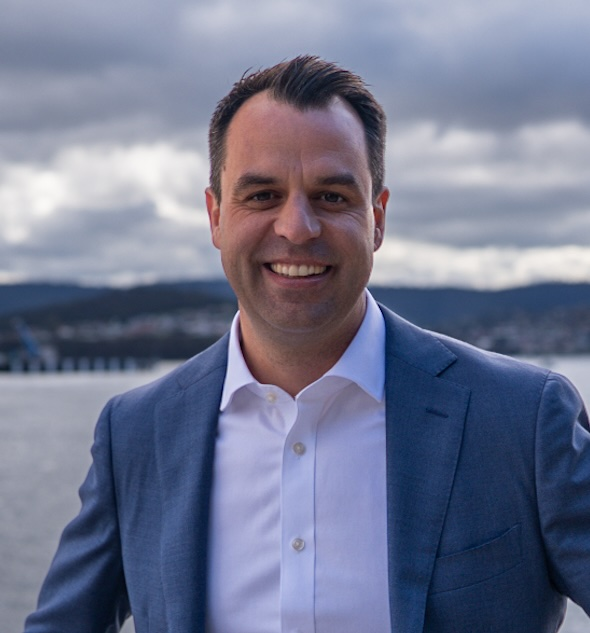

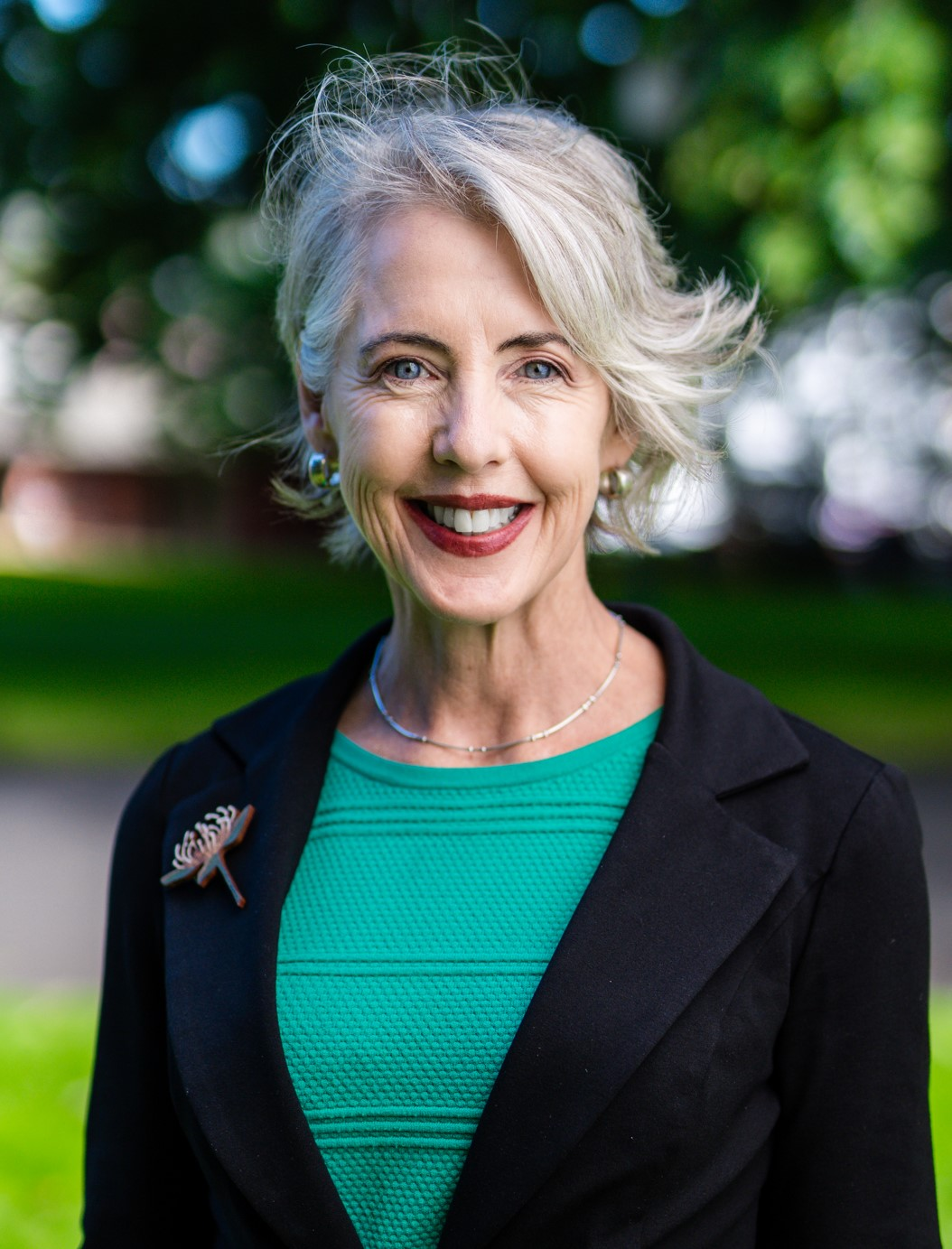
Leader	Jeremy Rockliff	Josh Willie
Party	Liberal	Labor
Leader since	8 April 2022	20 August 2025
Leader's seat	Braddon	Clark
Last election	14 seats	10 seats
Current seats	14	10
		SFF
Leader	Rosalie Woodruff	Wayne Turale
Party	Greens	Shooters
Leader since	13 July 2023	25 November 2025
Leader's seat	Franklin	None
Last election	5 seats	1 seat
Current seats	4	1
Incumbent Premier
Jeremy Rockliff
Liberal

The next Tasmanian state election is expected to be held sometime in 2029 to elect all 35 members to the Tasmanian House of Assembly.

The election follows the 2025 Tasmanian state election, which delivered a hung parliament in which no party had a legislative majority. 2025 Tasmanian government formation negotiations proved largely unsuccessful, with then-Labor leader Dean Winter unable to convince crossbenchers to support his bid for government. In the August 2025 no-confidence motion in Rockliff, the Greens, SFF and all independent crossbenchers supported the Liberal government, citing Labor unwillingness to negotiate. Josh Willie took leadership of the Labor Party following the 2025 Tasmanian Labor Party leadership election.

Liberal premier Jeremy Rockliff is expected to contest the election in attempt to win a sixth consecutive election, with Josh Willie attempting to lead the Labor Party into government for the first time since 2014. The Greens, SFF and other minor parties are also expected to contest.

== Background ==
=== Changes in parliament ===
On 2 January 2026, Helen Burnet resigned from the Tasmanian Greens to sit as an independent saying she wanted to be more "effective, accountable and heard".

Seat	Before		Change		After		
Seat	Member	Party	Type	Date	Date	Member	Party
Clark	Helen Burnet	Greens	Resignation	2 January 2026		Helen Burnet	Independent

== Retiring MPs ==
=== Independent ===
- Peter George (Franklin) – announced retirement 17 April 2026

== Candidates ==
Parties registered with the Tasmanian Electoral Commission (TEC) are eligible to contest the election. Seven parties were registered as of 21 August 2026:

- Animal Justice (did not endorse candidates in 2025)
- Greens
- Labor
- Liberal
- The Nationals
- One Nation
- Shooters, Fishers and Farmers

== Opinion polling ==
=== Voting intention ===
Date	Polling firm	Client	Sample size	Margin of error	Primary vote							
Date	Polling firm	Client	Sample size	Margin of error	LIB	ALP	GRN	ONP	SFF	NAT	IND	Others
11-12 Nov 2026	EMRS	—N/a	1,000	±3.1%	24%	25%	14%	23%	—N/a	—N/a	13%	1%
1–20 Sep 2026	DemosAU	—N/a	1,097	±3.6%	28%	22%	15%	21%	2%	—N/a	10%	2%
17–18 Aug 2026	EMRS	—N/a	1,000	±3.1%	26%	23%	16%	21%	—N/a	—N/a	14%	—N/a
21 Jun—6 Jul 2026	DemosAU	—N/a	999	±3.6%	28%	21%	14%	21%	2%	—N/a	12%	2%
11–13 May 2026	EMRS	—N/a	1,000	±3.1%	25%	24%	14%	19%	—N/a	—N/a	16%	1%
16–19 Feb 2026	EMRS	—N/a	947	±3.1%	29%	23%	15%	14%	—N/a	—N/a	15%	3%
27 Jan – 12 Feb 2026	DemosAU	—N/a	1,071	±3.6%	35%	23%	15%	—N/a	4%	—N/a	17%	6%
17–21 Nov 2025	EMRS	—N/a	1,000	±3.1%	34%	25%	17%	—N/a	—N/a	—N/a	19%	6%
16–27 Oct 2025	DemosAU	—N/a	1,021	±4.4%	41%	24%	15%	—N/a	2%	—N/a	14%	4%
25–28 Aug 2025	EMRS	—N/a	1,047	±3.02%	38%	24%	13%	—N/a	—N/a	—N/a	19%	6%
20 Jul 2025	2025 election				39.9%	25.9%	14.4%	—	2.9%	1.6%	15.3%	—

=== Leadership approval ===
==== Preferred premier ====
Date	Polling firm	Client	Sample size	Party leaders			Net
Date	Polling firm	Client	Sample size	Rockliff	Willie	Unsure	Net
11-12 Nov 2026	EMRS	—N/a	1,000	41%	33%	24%	8%
1–20 Sep 2026	DemosAU	—N/a	1,097	42%	34%	24%	8%
17–18 Aug 2026	EMRS	—N/a	1,000	37%	30%	33%	7%
21 Jun—6 Jul 2026	DemosAU	—N/a	999	41%	32%	27%	9%
11–13 May 2026	EMRS	—N/a	1,000	44%	25%	34%	19%
16–19 Feb 2026	EMRS	—N/a	947	40%	26%	34%	14%
27 Jan – 12 Feb 2026	DemosAU	—N/a	1,071	43%	32%	25%	12%
16–27 Oct 2025	DemosAU	—N/a	1,021	46%	34%	20%	12%
25–28 Aug 2025	EMRS	—N/a	1,047	50%	24%	23%	26%

=== Individual politician favourability ===
==== Liberal ====
Date	Polling firm	Client	Sample size	Liberal politician net favourability			
Date	Polling firm	Client	Sample size	Abetz	Barnett	Rockliff	Archer
11-12 Nov 2026	EMRS	—N/a	1,000	—N/a	—N/a	-1%	—N/a
1–20 Sep 2026	DemosAU	—N/a	1,097	-18%	-7%	0%	-4%
16–27 Oct 2025	DemosAU	—N/a	1,021	-19%	-14%	-3%	—N/a
25–28 Aug 2025	EMRS	—N/a	1,047	—N/a	—N/a	18%	—N/a

==== Labor ====
Date	Polling firm	Client	Sample size	Labor politician net favourability		
Date	Polling firm	Client	Sample size	Winter	Willie	Haddad
11-12 Nov 2026	EMRS	—N/a	1,000	—N/a	-6%	—N/a
1–20 Sep 2026	DemosAU	—N/a	1,097	-14%	-8%	-5%
16–27 Oct 2025	DemosAU	—N/a	1,021	-33%	-5%	—N/a
25–28 Aug 2025	EMRS	—N/a	1,047	-9%	4%	—N/a

==== Crossbench ====
Date	Polling firm	Client	Sample size	Crossbench politician net favourability				
Date	Polling firm	Client	Sample size	Woodruff	Garland	George	Johnston	O'Byrne
11-12 Nov 2026	EMRS	—N/a	1,000	-6%	—N/a	—N/a	—N/a	—N/a
1–20 Sep 2026	DemosAU	—N/a	1,097	-12%	—N/a	—N/a	4%	9%
16–27 Oct 2025	DemosAU	—N/a	1,021	-20%	-10%	-2%	0%	—N/a
25–28 Aug 2025	EMRS	—N/a	1,047	-2%	+3%	+4%	+12%	+21%
