= Members of the Tasmanian Legislative Council, 2010–2014 =

This is a list of members of the Tasmanian Legislative Council from 2010 to 2014. Terms of the Legislative Council do not coincide with House of Assembly elections, with members serving six-year terms, and two or three members facing re-election every year. The members have been categorised here according to the four-year terms of the House of Assembly so as to avoid the need for separate member lists for each year.

Name	Party	Electorate	First elected	Term expires
Hon Michael Aird ^{2}	Labor Party	Derwent	1995	2011
Hon Rosemary Armitage ^{2}	Independent	Launceston	2011	2017
Hon Ivan Dean	Independent	Windermere	2003	2015
Hon Craig Farrell ^{2}	Australian Labor Party	Derwent	2011	2015
Hon Kerry Finch	Independent	Rosevears	2002	2014
Hon Ruth Forrest ^{2}	Independent	Murchison	2005	2017
Hon Mike Gaffney	Independent	Mersey	2009	2015
Hon Vanessa Goodwin	Liberal Party	Pembroke	2009	2019
Hon Greg Hall ^{3}	Independent	Western Tiers	2001	2018
Hon Paul Harriss	Independent	Huon	1996	2014
Hon Leonie Hiscutt	Liberal Party of Australia	Montgomery	2013	2019
Hon Tony Mulder ^{2}	Independent	Rumney	2011	2017
Hon Doug Parkinson ^{3}	Australian Labor Party	Hobart	1994	2012
Hon Tania Rattray ^{1}	Independent	Apsley	2004	2016
Hon Sue Smith	Independent	Montgomery	1997	2013
Hon Adriana Taylor ^{1}	Independent	Elwick	2010	2016
Hon Lin Thorp ^{2}	Australian Labor Party	Rumney	1999	2011
Hon Rob Valentine ^{3}	Independent	Hobart	2012	2018
Hon Jim Wilkinson	Independent	Nelson	1995	2019
Hon Don Wing ^{2}	Independent	Launceston	1982	2011

^{1} Apsley MLC Tania Rattray was re-elected unopposed at the 2010 periodic elections. Elwick MLC Terry Martin retired, and the election for his seat was won by Adriana Taylor.
^{2} Murchison MLC Ruth Forrest was re-elected unopposed at the 2011 periodic elections. Launceston MLC Don Wing retired and was replaced by fellow independent Rosemary Armitage, while Rumney Labor MLC Lin Thorp was defeated by independent candidate Tony Mulder. In a by-election held on the same day to replace Derwent MLC Labor Michael Aird, Labor candidate Craig Farrell was elected.
^{3} Western Tiers MLC Greg Hall was re-elected at the 2012 periodic elections. Hobart MLC Doug Parkinson retired, and the election for his seat was won by former Lord Mayor of Hobart Rob Valentine.
