= Terry Martin =

Terry Martin may refer to:

- Terry Martin (astronomer), American astronomer
- Terry Martin (rugby league) (born 1980), Celtic Crusaders rugby league player
- Terry Martin (fighter) (born 1980), American mixed martial artist
- Terry Martin (producer) (c.1944–2019), American television producer and journalist
- Terry Martin (publisher), British editor, writer, poet, and artist
- Terry Martin (Australian politician) (born 1957), Australian politician
- Terry Martin Sr. (1918–2001), his father, also an Australian politician
- Terry Martin (Alaska politician) (born 1936), American politician in the Alaska House of Representatives
- Terry Martin (ice hockey) (born 1955), Canadian former professional ice hockey player
- Terry Martin (surfer) (1937–2012), California surfboard shaper
- Terry Martin (actor), see 80,000 Suspects
