= 2025 Tasmanian government formation =

Parliamentary arrangements in Australia

- Part of the 2025 Tasmanian state election and the premiership of Jeremy Rockliff
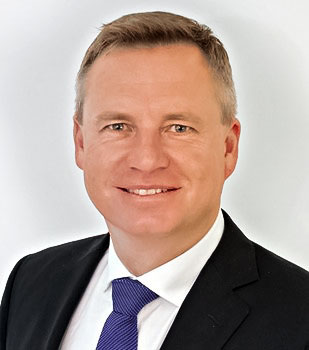
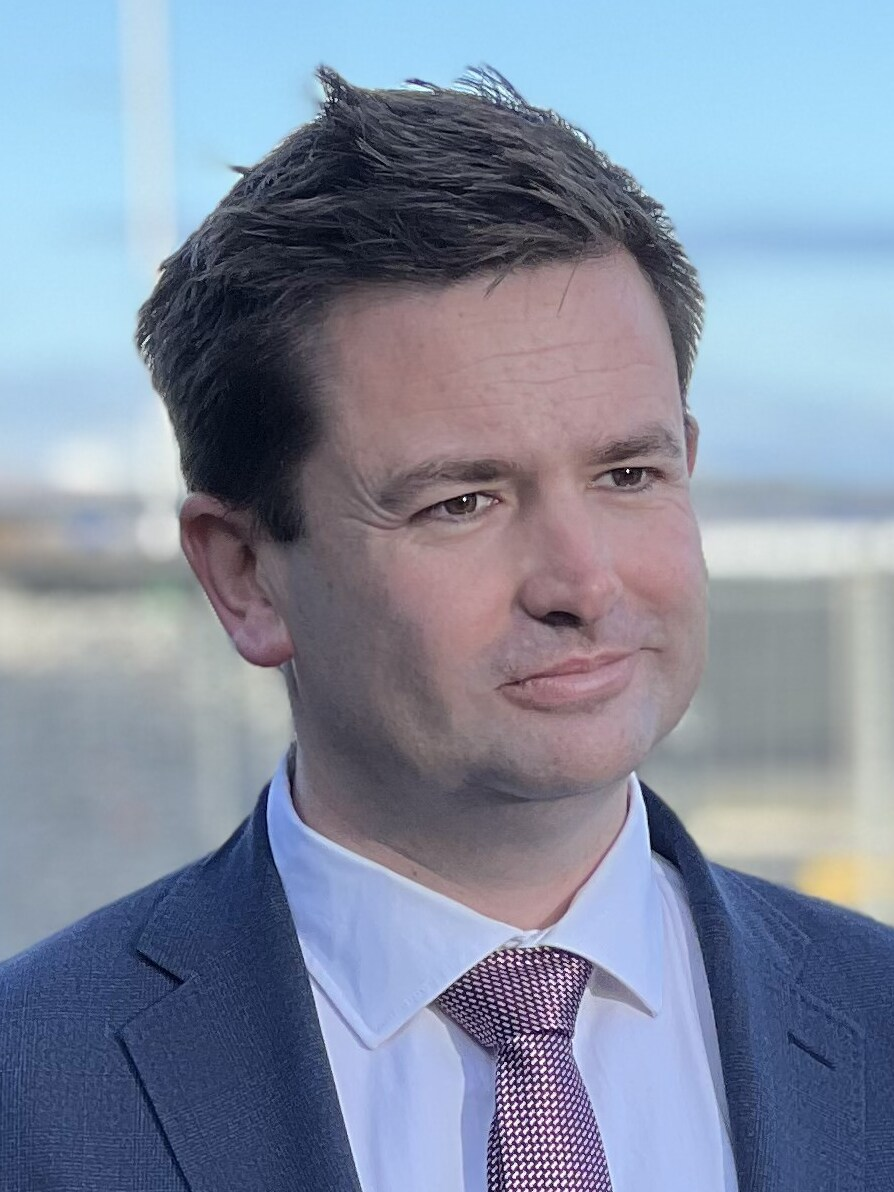
- Date: 19 July – 19 August 2025
- Location: Parliament of Tasmania
- Type: Government formation
- Cause: Hung parliament delivered at the 2025 state election
- Participants: Liberals • Labor (senior parties); Greens • SFF (minor parties); 5 Independents
- Predecessor: 2024 formation
- Winner: Premiership of Jeremy Rockliff; Liberal
- Parliamentary Changes: Independent Tania Rattray brought into cabinet; Josh Willie replaces Dean Winter as Labor leader
- Confidence in Labor; Motion Results
Party	Leader	Current seats
"No" votes
Liberal	Jeremy Rockliff	13 (Note: The Liberal Party has 14 seats in the House of Assembly, however, due to Jacquie Petrusma's election as Speaker, they only have 13 votes except in the case of a tie.)
Greens	Rosalie Woodruff	5
SFF	N/A	1
Independents	N/A	5
"Aye" votes
Labor	Dean Winter	10

Following the 2025 Tasmanian state election, no single political party attained a legislative majority in the House of Assembly, resulting in a hung parliament. As such, negotiations took place among Tasmania's political parties and independents in an effort to form government.

On election night, incumbent Premier Jeremy Rockliff claimed victory for his Liberal party, and Labor's then-leader Dean Winter did not concede defeat. Greens leader Rosalie Woodruff expressed a willingness to form government with Labor.

Rockliff was recommissioned as Premier following the election by convention; however his confidence in parliament would be tested on 19 August, when Labor sought to form government.

In the weeks following the election, Greens leader Rosalie Woodruff ruled out forming a government with Labor, effectively ending Labor's bid for government. Independent Craig Garland also withdrew his announced support for Labor. The Liberals had reversed a prior commitment to expand native forestry, announced a ban on greyhound racing starting from 2029, and appointed independent Tania Rattray to lead the government in the upper house.

When parliament returned on 19 August, Labor's motion of no confidence in Jeremy Rockliff failed, with Rockliff remaining as premier. Due to confirmation of Labor's election loss, the party's constitution triggered a 2025 leadership election. Josh Willie succeeded Dean Winter as leader.

== Negotiations ==
On the day following the election, Rockliff confirmed he had reached out to a number of crossbenchers in an attempt to form government. The Liberals had won 14 seats, requiring 4 crossbenchers to secure 18 seats (a majority). The following crossbenchers were elected:

- Peter George, considered a progressive;
- Kristie Johnston, considered a progressive;
- David O'Byrne, considered a progressive, however pro-stadium;
- Craig Garland, considered a progressive;
- George Razay, an anti-stadium independent.
- Carlo Di Falco (SFF), considered a conservative.
- Greens (5 seats), progressive

In the previous parliamentary term, Johnston and O'Byrne signed confidence and supply agreements with the Liberal government, however Johnston supported all no-confidence motions brought against the government, including the one that toppled Rockliff's premiership prior to the 2025 state election. O'Byrne, a former Labor leader and stadium advocate, kept his agreement with Rockliff, and stated that in this coming term, he would not go to Rockliff with a list of demands to get his support.

All three former Jacqui Lambie Network members who supported Rockliff's premiership prior to the election had been defeated.

On the day following the election, Winter did not concede. Instead, he said he would let the Liberals attempt to form a government first, and if they were unable to do so, Labor would attempt to. He said "another election is not an option."

On 21 July, The Mercury reported that Winter was actively talking to crossbenchers in an effort to form a government despite previously stating that he would offer Rockliff the first opportunity to form government. Woodruff also pressured Winter to negotiate with the Greens.

On 2 August, George Razay, an independent, was confirmed as elected in Bass.

=== Crossbench positions ===
Peter George, a progressive, first stated he would not sign a confidence-and-supply agreement, however he had walked this back. He set stringent conditions on himself before he would vote to support a no-confidence motion in a government. He met with Labor leader Dean Winter on 22 July for under an hour. In early August, George sent a letter to Rockliff outlining his demands for supporting Rockliff, these are:

- Banning expansion of salmon farming, and eventual banning of the farms themselves;
- Abandoning the Macquarie Point Stadium;
- Phasing out native forestry;
- Strengthening anti-corruption measures.

Kristie Johnston ruled out signing a confidence and supply agreement.

Craig Garland completely ruled out supporting a Liberal government, and committed to support Labor. He later voted against Labor's motion of no confidence.

David O'Byrne expressed an openness to signing a confidence and supply agreement, and pledged not to ask anything of the government in return. On 17 August, he announced his support for the Liberals and declined offers from them for ministerial portfolios.

Carlo Di Falco said he is open to signing a confidence and supply agreement, saying "I'll work with whoever can provide my constituents with the best outcome." He also prioritised the following in discussions:

- Being more pro-development, cutting regulation and increasing incentives for entrepreneurs.
- He is anti-stadium, but appreciates that the majority of Tasmanians did vote for a party that supports it. He said that if he had his way, the money spent on a stadium would instead go to upgrading Tasmania's hydropower facilities and storage.
- Loosening gun regulations.
- He did state he wouldn't support the Liberals unless the greyhound ban put in place was reversed.

Rosalie Woodruff said she is 'entirely optimistic about having conversations with Labor' and that the Greens and Labor '"fundamentally share far more in common than we have differences." On 12 August, Woodruff issued a statement saying she could not support Labor's attempt to form government at this stage, unless they gave concessions to the Greens.

=== Stability agreement proposals ===
On 22 July 2025, the Liberal party presented a draft 'stability agreement' to the members of the crossbench. The draft stability agreement was made available to crossbenchers for 'about an hour or two' before Rockliff publicly released it, leading to backlash from newly elected Peter George. Craig Garland described it as a 'step in the right direction', and that he was actively considering it. The agreement contained:

- A multi-party budget panel, involving independents and minor parties in the budget process, and ensuring a 'sensible return' to surplus;
- Ministerial consultation protocols, with the intent of providing the crossbench with briefings on upcoming policy, drafts of legislation, and discussions to offer amendments outside of parliament;
- A crossbench liaison office, providing briefings on policy and allowing for independent input;
- A commitment to keep prior parliamentary arrangements, such as OPC drafting support for private members' bills, access to the premier and departmental briefings and allowances for office management among others.

On 22 July 2025, a spokesperson for Labor said that the party was working on a similar agreement to the Liberals, but would not release further information until crossbenchers were consulted.

On 17 August, Labor unveiled their Framework for Collaboration. It included:

- The establishment of the office of Special Minister of State tasked with inter-party communications
- Budget repair measures
- Legislate for 4-year fixed parliamentary terms
- Establishing a Tasmanian Parliamentary Budget Office and Budget Roundtable
- Electoral law reform
- Decentralisation of public service leadership

=== Government positions ===
The following government positions were offered, or given to crossbenchers.

Parliamentarian	Party	Chamber	Position	Accepted
Labor
Ruth Forrest	Independent	Legislative Council	Treasurer	Yes (Note: As Labor did not form government, Forrest was not brought into government.)
Liberals
Tania Rattray	Independent	Legislative Council	Government Leader in Legislative Council	Yes
David O'Byrne	Independent	House of Assembly	Minister of Cabinet	No

August 2025 no-confidence vote in Jeremy Rockliff
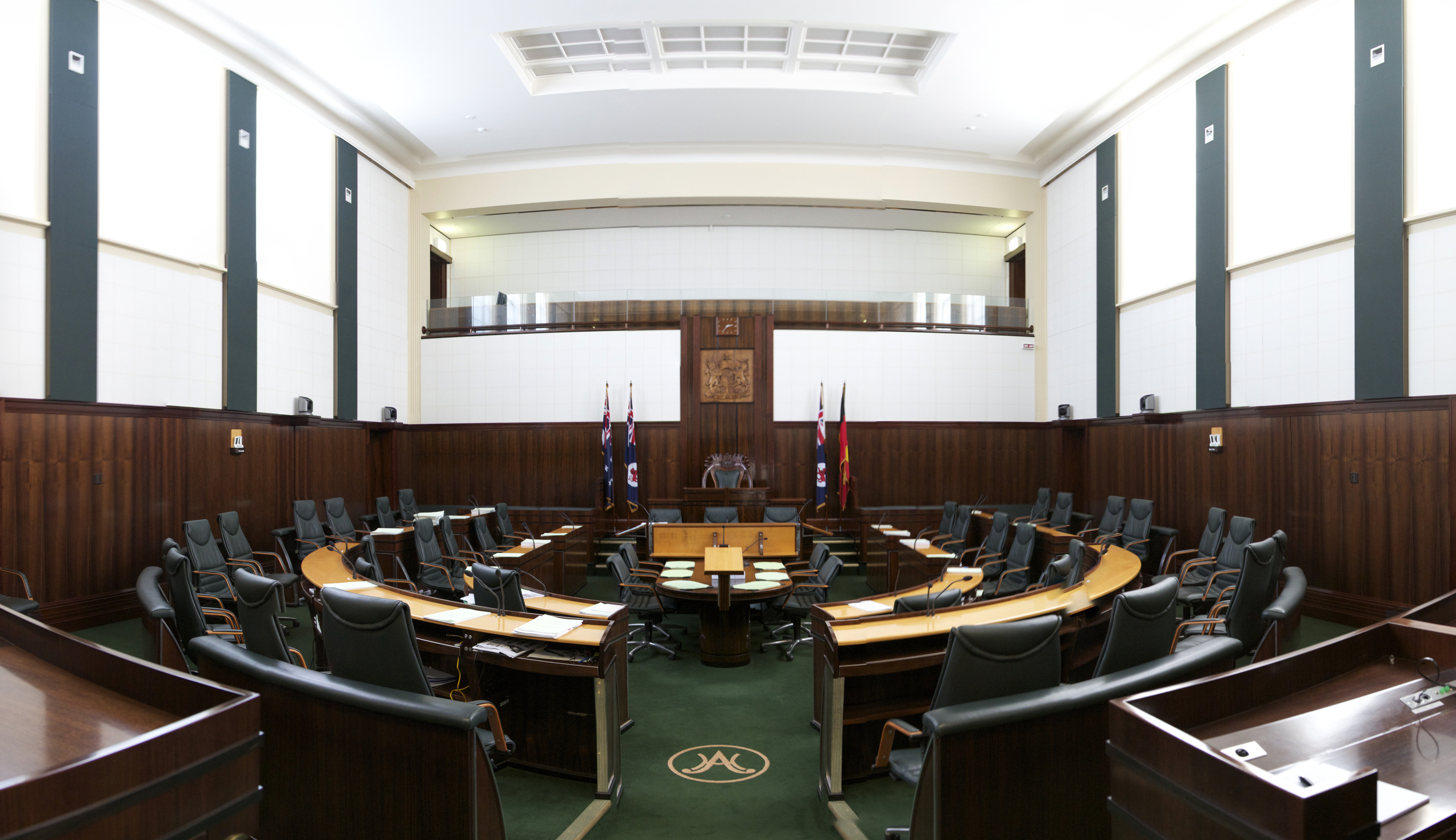
- House of Assembly chamber
- Date: 19 August 2025
- Duration: ~4 hours of debate
- Venue: Parliament House, Tasmania
- Type: Government formation
- Cause: Labor's attempt to gain government
- Participants: Liberals · Labor · Greens · SFF · Kristie Johnston · Craig Garland · Peter George · David O'Byrne · George Razay · Barbara Baker
- Outcome: Jeremy Rockliff retains government
- Vote result: 10 votes in favour, 24 votes against

== Formation ==
In August 2025, a combined motion of no-confidence in the premiership of Jeremy Rockliff and motion of confidence in Dean Winter was moved by Labor on the first sitting day of 19 August.

On 18 August, the Greens officially ruled out supporting Labor. Due to this, the Labor party could not form government via the confidence motion, and the Liberal party retained government.

That same day, Kristie Johnston and David O'Byrne confirmed they too would support the Liberal party on the motions. O'Byrne stated he would issue a letter of intent to the governor guaranteeing confidence and supply, with Johnston not offering a confidence and supply arrangement to the Liberals.

The motion failed, with 10 votes for, and 24 votes against. Rockliff remained as Premier.

2025 Speaker of the Tasmanian House of Assembly election
- 19 August 2025

	First party	Second party
Candidate	Jacquie Petrusma	Jen Butler
Party	Liberal	Labor
Chamber vote	24	10
Speaker before election
Michelle O'Byrne
Labor
Elected Speaker
Jacquie Petrusma
Liberal

Voting blocs
Party	Leader/Sole Member	Votes	Total (progressive)
"No" votes
Liberal	Jeremy Rockliff	13	24 (of 18 needed)
Greens	Rosalie Woodruff	5	24 (of 18 needed)
Independent	David O'Byrne	1	24 (of 18 needed)
Independent	Kristie Johnston	1	24 (of 18 needed)
Independent	Peter George	1	24 (of 18 needed)
Independent	George Razay	1	24 (of 18 needed)
SFF	Carlo Di Falco	1	24 (of 18 needed)
Independent	Craig Garland	1	24 (of 18 needed)
"Aye" votes
Labor	Dean Winter	10	10 (of 18 needed)

=== Election of the Speaker of the House of Assembly ===
On 19 August 2025, at the first sitting of the 52nd Parliament, an election was held for the Speaker of the House of Assembly. The two candidates for speaker were Franklin MP Jacquie Petrusma from the Liberal Party and Lyons MP Jen Butler from the Labor Party. The votes were cast by MPs in a secret ballot, and Petrusma was elected speaker with 25 votes to Butler's 10.

2025 Chair of Committees of the Tasmanian House of Assembly election
- 19 August 2025

	First party	Second party
Candidate	Helen Burnet	Jen Butler
Party	Greens	Labor
Chamber vote	21	12
Chair of Committees before election
Vacant
Elected Chair of Committees
Helen Burnet
Greens

Petrusma succeeded Labor member Michelle O'Byrne, who retired before the 2025 state election. She was elected with the parliamentary vote of all members excluding the Labor party.

=== Election of the Chair of Committees of the House of Assembly (Deputy Speaker) ===
On 19 August 2025, an election was held for the chair of committees, who serves ex officio as deputy-speaker. This election resulted in Helen Burnet of the Greens being successful against Jen Butler, with a vote of 21 to 12.

The office was vacant upon Burnet's election.

== See also ==
- 2024 Tasmanian government formation
- Premiership of Jeremy Rockliff
- Third Rockliff ministry
- Winter shadow ministry
- Tasmanian Greens Spokespeople
