= 2010 Tasmanian Legislative Council periodic election =

Legislative election in Tasmania, Australia

← 2009	1 May 2010	2011 →

2 of the 15 seats in the Legislative Council 8 seats needed for a majority
	First party
Party	Independent
Seats before	2
Seats won	2
Seat change	Steady

Periodic elections for the Tasmanian Legislative Council were held on 1 May 2010. The two seats up for election were Apsley, held by independent MLC Tania Rattray, and Elwick, held by retiring Labor-turned-independent MLC Terry Martin. These seats were last contested in 2004.

== Apsley ==
Sitting independent MLC Tania Rattray was the sole nominee for the election in Apsley, which she had held since 2004. She was thus declared re-elected unopposed.

=== Apsley results ===
Tasmanian Legislative Council periodic elections, 2010: Apsley
Party	Candidate	Votes	%	±%
Independent	Tania Rattray	unopposed		
Independent hold		Swing	N/A	

== Elwick ==
The Hobart seat had been held by Terry Martin since 2004. Martin was facing court on charges of child sex offences, and was not recontesting the election. A frontrunner emerged in Adriana Taylor, Glenorchy Mayor and Labor Party member, although in common with the prevalence of independents in the Legislative Council, Taylor did not seek party endorsement. There were suggestions that Lisa Singh, defeated Labor MHA and former government minister, or Andrew Wilkie might run, but these came to nothing. The Labor Party did endorse a candidate, Health and Community Services Union official Tim Jacobson. The Tasmanian Greens endorsed Housing Tasmania policy officer Kartika Franks, who ran on the Greens' ticket in Denison at the 2010 state election.

=== Elwick results ===
Tasmanian Legislative Council periodic elections, 2010: Elwick
Party	Candidate	Votes	%	±%
Independent	Adriana Taylor	9,598	48.88	+48.88
Labor	Tim Jacobson	7,455	37.97	+37.97
Greens	Kartika Franks	2,581	13.15	+13.15
Total formal votes		19,634	95.89	
Informal votes		842	4.11	
Turnout		20,476	81.19	
Two-party-preferred result
Independent	Adriana Taylor	11,011	56.08	+56.08
Labor	Tim Jacobson	8,623	43.92	+43.92
Independent hold		Swing		
