= Sue Hickey =

Australian politician

The Honourable Mayor Alderman Sue Hickey

34th Speaker of the Tasmanian House of Assembly
- In office 1 May 2018 – 22 June 2021
- Preceded by: Mark Shelton
- Succeeded by: Mark Shelton

68th Lord Mayor of Hobart
- In office 5 November 2014 – 21 March 2018
- Deputy: Ron Christie
- Preceded by: Damon Thomas
- Succeeded by: Ron Christie

Member of the Tasmanian House of Assembly for Denison
- In office 3 March 2018 – 28 September 2018

Member of the Tasmanian House of Assembly for Clark
- In office 28 September 2018 – 1 May 2021

Mayor of Glenorchy
- Incumbent
- Assumed office 22 June 2024
- Deputy: Russell Yaxley
- Preceded by: Bec Thomas

Deputy Mayor of Glenorchy
- In office 27 October 2022 – 22 June 2024

Alderman of Glenorchy
- Incumbent
- Assumed office 21 July 2021

Personal details
- Born: 25 July 1958 (age 67) Hobart, Tasmania, Australia
- Party: Liberal (until March 2021); Independent (since March 2021)

Susanne Lynnette Hickey (born 25 July 1958) is an Australian politician. She represented the electorate of Denison (later re-named Clark) from the 2018 state election until her defeat at the 2021 election, sitting with the Liberal Party until March 2021, when she quit the party and became an independent. Hickey is currently Mayor of the City of Glenorchy.

At the time of the election Hickey had been Speaker of the Tasmanian House of Assembly since May 2018, having unexpectedly won the Speaker position with the support of the opposition Labor and Greens parties over the Liberal government's nominee Rene Hidding. She previously served as Lord Mayor of Hobart from 2014 until 2018.

== Early career ==
Hickey first entered public life when she won the Miss Tasmania Quest in 1979. She was also a television weather girl on TVT6 for many years. She later worked in a number of retail and service positions, before starting a career in marketing. In 1991, she established her own marketing business, Slick Promotions. Hickey won the Tasmanian Businesswoman of the Year award in 2007. Hickey obtained an MBA from the University of Tasmania in 2012 whilst running her own business, being an Alderman on the Hobart City Council and being President of the Rotary Club of Hobart.

== Lord Mayor of Hobart ==
She was a successful candidate for the Hobart City Council in the 2011 Tasmanian local government elections, elected as Alderman.

Hickey defeated incumbent Lord Mayor Damon Thomas at the 2014 local government elections, serving in the role until her election to State Parliament.

== State political career and Speaker of the House of Assembly ==
In 2018, Hickey successfully ran as a Liberal candidate for Denison (now Clark) in the Tasmanian House of Assembly.

She unexpectedly won the Speaker position with the support of the opposition Labor and Greens parties over Liberal nominee Rene Hidding, and has stated that she will not attend Liberal Party meetings and will "mostly" vote with the Government, but will assess bills "on their merit".

On 1 May 2018, at the first sitting of the House of Assembly after the election, Labor leader Rebecca White nominated Hickey as Speaker, in competition with the Liberal Party's preferred candidate, Rene Hidding. Hickey was elected Speaker with the support of Labor and the Greens. After her ascension to the position, Hickey said she would attempt to "mostly" vote with the Government, but would assess bills "on their merit". Though confirming she would vote independently on government bills, she also said she would "always support the Liberal Government" on confidence and supply. During her Speakership, Hickey occasionally deprived the Liberal Party of its 13-12 majority in the Assembly. Her vote was critical in several parliamentary votes opposed by the sitting government, most notably in advancing transgender-related birth certificate reforms and blocking legislation that would have made imposed mandatory sentences for serious child sexual assaults; citing "significant concerns from the legal profession" and "unintended consequences to the detriment of the victims".

=== Departure from the Liberal Party ===
On 22 March 2021, Hickey announced that she would quit the Liberal party and sit as an independent, criticising the state Liberals as "unable to accommodate strong women" after being told by Premier Peter Gutwein that she would not be endorsed for the next election. The Liberal government lost its majority and briefly plunged into minority government, before a snap election was called for 1 May 2021. She unsuccessfully ran again as an independent in the snap election.

=== Allegations against Eric Abetz ===
Two days after quitting the Liberal Party, Hickey accused Liberal Senator Eric Abetz in the Tasmanian Parliament of making "slut-shaming" comments on Brittany Higgins, who was allegedly raped by a male staffer in the Federal Parliament in Canberra. She alleged that Abetz told her at a citizenship ceremony in Hobart on March 1:

As for that Higgins girl, anybody so disgustingly drunk who would sleep with anybody could have slept with one of our spies and put the security of the nation at risk.

Hickey also alleged that Abetz told her "not to worry" about the 1988 rape allegation against federal Attorney-General Christian Porter as "the woman is dead and the law will protect [Porter]". Abetz "categorically denied" making the comments and accused Hickey of "trying to destroy the [Liberal] party". Hickey responded in reply to Abetz accusing him of "grubby politics" and that she stood by her statement.

Later on the same day, Premier Peter Gutwein wrote to Prime Minister Scott Morrison, stating that Hickey raised the matter of Abetz's comments with him weeks earlier and requested Morrison to "consider the matters raised".

== Deputy Mayor and Mayor of Glenorchy ==
After losing in the 2021 state election Hickey ran in the 2021 Glenorchy City Council by-elections for mayor and alderman, which were caused by Mayor Kristie Johnston's election to state parliament in the 2021 state election. Hickey was elected as alderman but beaten by Bec Thomas for mayor.

Hickey ran again in the 2022 Tasmanian local elections, was re-elected alderman and was elected deputy mayor of Glenorchy.

Following Mayor Bec Thomas being elected to state parliament in the 2024 Tasmanian Legislative Council periodic election, Hickey became acting mayor. Hickey won the resulting 2024 Glenorchy City Council by-election, becoming mayor of Glenorchy City Council in June 2024.

Civic offices
Preceded by Damon Thomas	Lord Mayor of Hobart; 2014–2018	Succeeded by Ron Christie
Preceded by Bec Thomas	Mayor of Glenorchy; 2024–present	Incumbent
Parliament of Tasmania
Preceded by Mark Shelton	Speaker of the Tasmanian House of Assembly; 2018–2021	Succeeded by Mark Shelton
