= 1934 Tasmanian state election =

State election in Australia

- 9 June 1934

All 30 seats to the House of Assembly
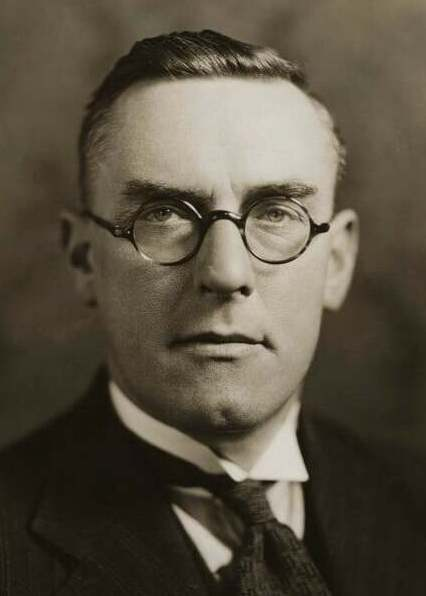

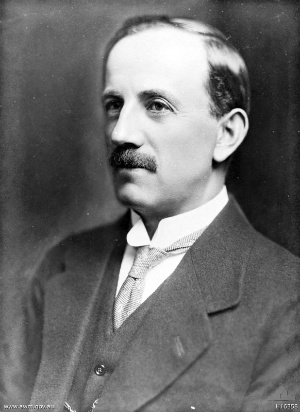
	First party	Second party
Leader	Albert Ogilvie	Walter Lee
Party	Labor	Nationalist
Leader since	October 1929	15 March 1934
Leader's seat	Franklin	Wilmot
Last election	10 seats	19 seats
Seats won	14 seats	13 seats
Seat change	▲4	▼6
Percentage	45.78%	46.72%
Swing	▲10.85	▼9.68
- Results of the election
Premier before election
Walter Lee
Nationalist
Resulting Premier
Albert Ogilvie
Labor

The 1934 Tasmanian state election was held on 9 June 1934 in the Australian state of Tasmania to elect 30 members of the Tasmanian House of Assembly. The election used the Hare-Clark proportional representation system — six members were elected from each of five electorates.

The Nationalist Party won a huge victory in the 1931 election, but Premier of Tasmania John McPhee had resigned due to health problems, and the Nationalists were led into the 1934 election by former Premier Walter Lee. The Labor Party were led by Albert Ogilvie, who had managed to heal some of the rifts in the Labor Party that had contributed to their election loss in 1931.

Labor regained much of their ground in the 1934 election, winning 14 seats compared to the Nationalists' 13 (although the Nationalists had received more votes), not enough to govern in a majority. Three seats were won by Independent candidates, and it was only through the support of one of these (George Carruthers, an ex-Labor man and proponent of the Douglasite Social Credit concept), that Labor was able to form government, with Ogilvie as Premier.

Labor began an uninterrupted 35 year rule over Tasmania until 1969, which marks the longest stretch of continuous Labor rule in any state or territory in its history.

== Results ==
Party	Votes	%	+/–	Seats	+/–
Nationalist	54,549	46.72	-9.68	13	▼6
Labor	53,454	45.78	+10.85	14	▲4
Independents	8,764	7.51	-1.17	3	▲2
Total	116,767	100.00	–	30	–
Valid votes	116,767	96.78			
Invalid/blank votes	3,885	3.22	-0.25		
Total votes	120,652	100.00	–		
Registered voters/turnout	127,681	94.49	-0.52		

Popular vote
Nationalist	46.72%
Labor	45.78%
Independents	7.51%

Seats
Labor	46.67%
Nationalist	43.33%
Independents	10.00%

== Distribution of votes ==
=== Primary vote by division ===
	Bass	Darwin	Denison	Franklin	Wilmot
Labor Party	50.8%	40.8%	48.7%	51.9%	35.8%
Nationalist	49.2%	52.8%	37.8%	37.8%	57.0%
Other	–	6.3%	13.5%	10.3%	7.3%

=== Distribution of seats ===
Electorate	Seats won
Bass	
Darwin	
Denison	
Franklin	
Wilmot	

Labor
Nationalist
Independent

== See also ==
- Members of the Tasmanian House of Assembly, 1934–1937
- Candidates of the 1934 Tasmanian state election
