= Electoral results for the Division of Hobart =

This is a list of electoral results for the electoral division of Hobart in Tasmanian Legislative Council elections since it was reconstituted in 2008.

== Members ==
Second incarnation (2008–present)
Member	Party	Period
Doug Parkinson	Labor	2008–2012
Rob Valentine	Independent	2012–2024
Cassy O'Connor	Greens	2024–present

== Election results ==
=== Elections in the 2020s ===
==== 2024 ====
2024 Tasmanian Legislative Council periodic election: Hobart
Party	Candidate	Votes	%	±%
Greens	Cassy O'Connor	7,104	36.86	+36.86
Independent	John Kelly	4,287	22.24	+22.24
Labor	John Kamara	3,578	18.57	+18.57
Independent	Charlie Burton	2,615	13.57	+13.57
Independent	Stefan Vogel	725	3.76	+3.76
Independent	Sam Campbell	522	2.71	+2.71
Independent	Michael Haynes	441	2.29	+2.29
Total formal votes		19,272	97.49	+0.42
Informal votes		497	2.51	–0.42
Turnout		19,769	80.56	+4.14
Registered electors		24,538		
Two-candidate-preferred result
Greens	Cassy O'Connor	11,236	59.70	+59.70
Independent	John Kelly	7,586	40.30	+40.30
Greens gain from Independent				

=== Elections in the 2010s ===
==== 2018 ====
Tasmanian Legislative Council periodic elections, 2018: Hobart
Party	Candidate	Votes	%	±%
Independent	Rob Valentine	8,034	43.91	N/A
Independent	Richard Griggs	4,691	25.64	N/A
Liberal	Simon Behrakis	3,485	19.05	N/A
Animal Justice	Chris Simcox	1,319	7.21	N/A
Tasmanians 4 Tasmania	Alan Barnett	413	2.26	N/A
Shooters, Fishers, Farmers	Brendon Hext	353	1.93	N/A
Total formal votes		18,295	97.07	N/A
Informal votes		553	2.93	N/A
Turnout		18,848	76.42	N/A
Two-candidate-preferred result
Independent	Rob Valentine	11,032	61.01	N/A
Independent	Richard Griggs	7,051	38.99	N/A
Independent hold		Swing	N/A	

==== 2012 ====
Tasmanian Legislative Council periodic elections, 2012: Hobart
Party	Candidate	Votes	%	±%
Independent	Rob Valentine	6,646	37.0	+37.0
Greens	Penelope Ann	3,935	22.6	–7.4
Labor	Dean Winter	3,347	19.2	−18.2
Independent	James Sugden	2,356	13.5	+13.5
Independent	Paul Hiscutt	768	4.4	–2.8
Independent	John Forster	547	3.1	+3.1
Total formal votes		17,399	96.9	+0.2
Informal votes		550	3.1	–0.2
Turnout		17,949	75.8	
Two-party-preferred result
Independent	Rob Valentine	10,617	62.5	+62.5
Greens	Penelope Ann	6,376	37.5	+0.2
Independent gain from Labor		Swing	N/A	
