= Damon Thomas =

Damon Thomas may refer to:

- Damon Thomas (American football) (born 1970), American football player
- Damon Thomas (politician) (born 1949), Australian public official
- Damon Thomas (record producer), American record producer, half of The Underdogs duo

== See also ==
- Damien Thomas (1942–2025), actor
