= 2016 Tasmanian Legislative Council periodic election =

Legislative election in Tasmania, Australia

← 2015	7 May 2016	2017 →

2 of the 15 seats in the Legislative Council 8 seats needed for a majority
	First party	Second party
Party	Independent	Labor
Seats before	2	0
Seats won	1	1
Seat change	▼1	▲1

Periodic elections for the Tasmanian Legislative Council were held on 7 May 2016. The two seats up for election were the electoral division of Apsley and the electoral division of Elwick. These seats were last contested in 2010.

== Apsley ==
The north-eastern Tasmanian division of Apsley has been held by independent member Tania Rattray since 2004. She was the sole nominee in the 2010 election and was declared re-elected unopposed.

In the 2016 election, Rattray faced competition from Darren Clark (Labor Party), CEO of the Tasmanian Association of Police and Community Youth Clubs; Brett Hall (Independent), a farmer; and Sophie Haughton (Tasmanian Greens).

=== Apsley Results ===
Tasmanian Legislative Council periodic elections, 2016: Apsley
Party	Candidate	Votes	%	±%
Independent	Tania Rattray	9,392	49.86	n/a
Labor	Darren Clark	4,367	23.19	n/a
Independent	Brett Hall	3,415	18.13	n/a
Greens	Sophie Houghton	1,661	8.82	n/a
Total formal votes		18,835	95.98	n/a
Informal votes		788	4.02	n/a
Turnout		19,623	77.63	n/a
After transfer of Houghton's votes
Independent	Tania Rattray	10,010	53.15	n/a
Labor	Darren Clark	4,963	26.35	n/a
Independent	Brett Hall	3,862	20.50	n/a
Independent hold		Swing	n/a	

== Elwick ==
The Hobart division of Elwick was held by Adriana Taylor, who won the seat in the 2010 election.

In the 2016 election, Taylor faced competition from Penelope Ann (Tasmanian Greens), a tourism manager; and Josh Willie (Labor Party), a teacher.

Labor's Josh Willie won the seat, defeating the incumbent independent, Adriana Taylor.

=== Elwick Results ===
Tasmanian Legislative Council periodic elections, 2016: Elwick
Party	Candidate	Votes	%	±%
Labor	Josh Willie	8,916	46.64	+8.67
Independent	Adriana Taylor	7,868	41.16	−7.73
Greens	Penelope Ann	2,332	12.20	−0.95
Total formal votes		19,116	94.94	−0.95
Informal votes		1,019	5.06	+0.95
Turnout		20,135	80.39	−0.73
Two-candidate-preferred result
Labor	Josh Willie	10,165	53.18	+9.26
Independent	Adriana Taylor	8,951	46.82	−9.26
Labor gain from Independent		Swing	+9.26	
