= 1931 Tasmanian state election =

State election in Australia

- 9 May 1931

All 30 seats to the House of Assembly
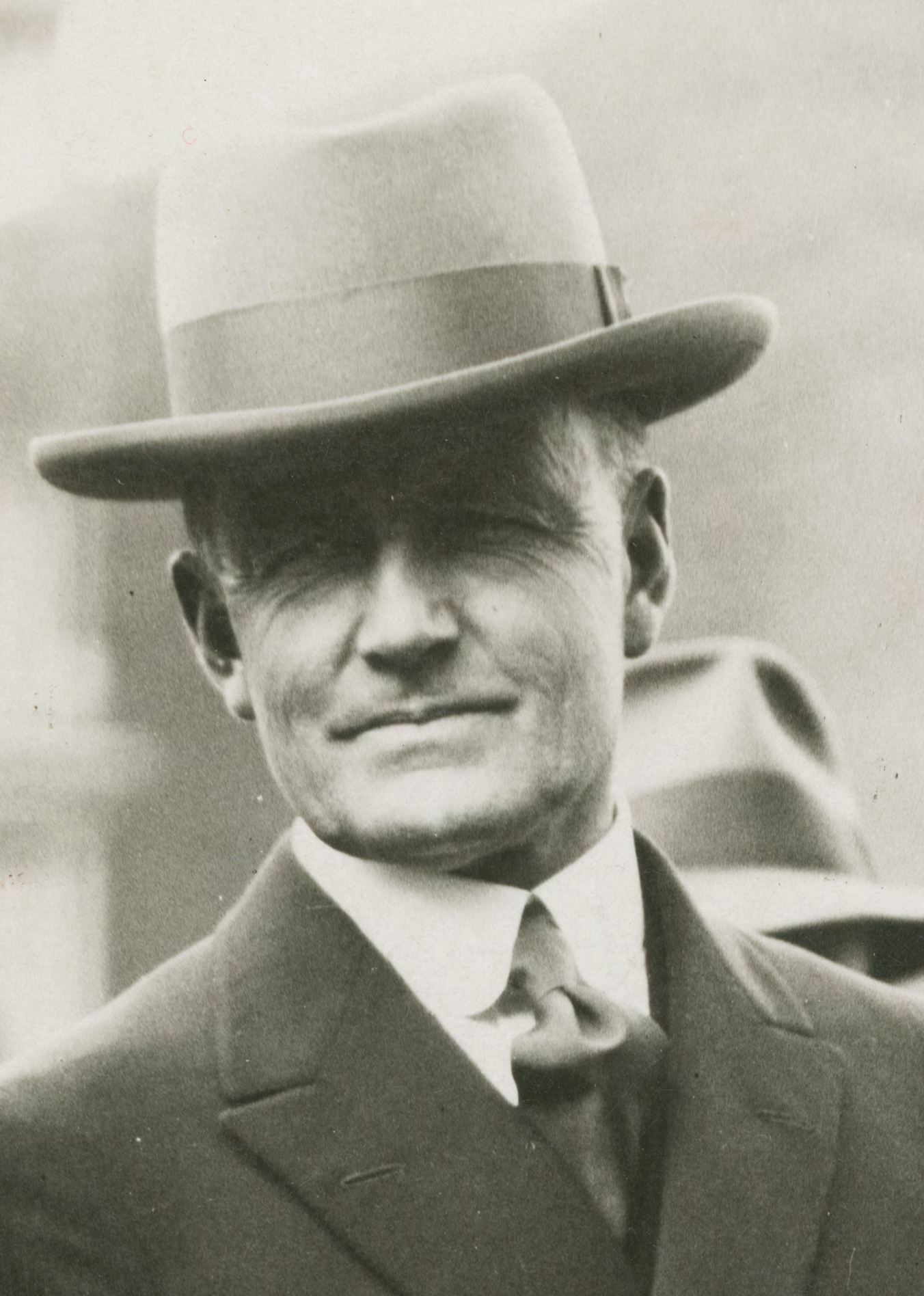

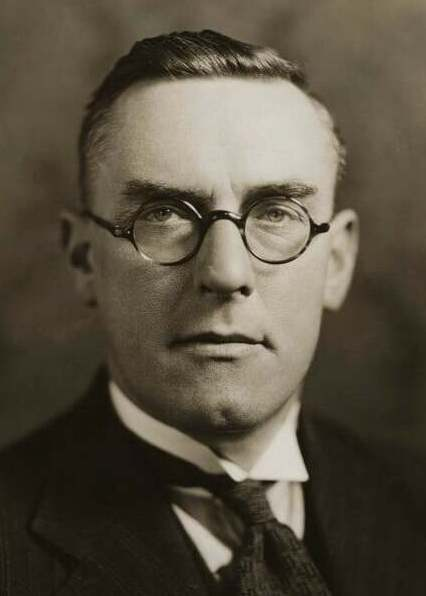
	First party	Second party
Leader	John McPhee	Albert Ogilvie
Party	Nationalist	Labor
Leader since	July 1925	October 1929
Leader's seat	Denison	Franklin
Last election	15 seats	14 seats
Seats won	19 seats	10 seats
Seat change	▲4	▼4
Percentage	56.40%	34.92%
Swing	▲14.20	▼12.23
- Results of the election
Premier before election
John McPhee
Nationalist
Elected Premier
John McPhee
Nationalist

The 1931 Tasmanian state election was held on 9 May 1931 in the Australian state of Tasmania to elect 30 members of the Tasmanian House of Assembly. The election used the Hare-Clark proportional representation system — six members were elected from each of five electorates. For the first time, voting was compulsory, resulting in a high voter turnout.

The Nationalist Party had defeated Labor by one seat at the 1928 election, and John McPhee had been Premier of Tasmania since then. Joseph Lyons left state politics in 1929 to enter federal politics, and was succeeded by Albert Ogilvie as leader of the dispirited Labor Party. The depression had struck Tasmania hard with unemployment nearly 30% and unions impotent.

The Nationalist Party won the 1931 election in a landslide, with 19 seats in the House of Assembly and a margin over Labor of more than 22%, the largest victory over Labor in Tasmania since Hare-Clark elections began in 1909. The win was attributed to public endorsement of McPhee's expenditure cuts over Ogilvie's expansionist policies. It has been said that Ogilvie's error was in identifying with an unpopular federal Labor government.

Despite the scale of the Nationalist victory, the non-Labor forces in Tasmania did not win another election until 1969.

== Results ==
Party	Votes	%	+/–	Seats	+/–
Nationalist	61,414	56.40	+14.20	19	▲4
Labor	38,030	34.92	-12.23	10	▼4
Independents	9,450	8.68	-2.07	1	Steady
Total	108,894	100.00	–	30	–
Valid votes	108,894	96.56			
Invalid/blank votes	3,885	3.44	+0.20		
Total votes	112,779	100.00	–		
Registered voters/turnout	118,730	94.99	+13.10		

Popular vote
Nationalist	56.40%
Labor	34.92%
Independents	8.68%

Seats
Nationalist	63.33%
Labor	33.33%
Independents	3.33%

== Distribution of votes ==
=== Primary vote by division ===
	Bass	Darwin	Denison	Franklin	Wilmot
Labor Party	37.2%	31.4%	40.3%	31.8%	34.2%
Nationalist	62.8%	60.0%	53.7%	43.9%	62.1%
Other	–	8.5%	6.1%	24.3%	3.7%

=== Distribution of seats ===
Electorate	Seats won
Bass	
Darwin	
Denison	
Franklin	
Wilmot	

Nationalist
Labor
Independent

== See also ==
- Members of the Tasmanian House of Assembly, 1931–1934
- Candidates of the 1931 Tasmanian state election
