= Gabriel Haros =

Australian politician

Gabriel George Haros (born 9 February 1944) is a former Australian politician and the founder of the PundaZoie Company a globally acknowledged company delivering the Greening the Desert Program – commercial solutions for sustainable agriculture, climate change and global food security.

Gabriel was born in Hobart, commenced his working life as a journalist with the Hobart Mercury and as a specialist court reporter with the Melbourne Herald, graduating from the University of Tasmania in 1973 and co-founding the Hobart law firm Haros Wallace and Meade in 1976.

In 1980 he was elected to the Tasmanian House of Assembly as a Liberal member for Denison. He served as Deputy Chair of Committees for a period, Chairman of the Standing Committee for Subordinate Legislation and Printing, Liberal Shadow Minister for Tourism, Environment, Racing & Gaming, Ethnic and Aboriginal Affairs and the Arts.

In 2002 Haros formed the PundaZoie Company (PundaZoie being Greek for everlasting life) creating the Greening the Desert Program with its flagship project being the partnership with the Scotdesco Aboriginal Community at Bookabie, near Ceduna on the Eyre Peninsula of South Australia which was visited by the Prime Minister of Australia the Hon Malcolm Turnbull MP and members of both the South Australian and Federal Government in October 2016.

Haros co-authored of a number of research papers in relation to regenerative agricultural solutions as a result of his company’s partnership with the University of Tasmania by way of an ARC Linkage Grant commencing in 2010.

In November 2016, the PundaZoie Company bid successfully for the largest soil organic carbon (SOC) contract under the Emissions Reduction Fund (ERF) for the supply of 7.5 million Australian Carbon Credit Units (ACCUs) to the Clean Energy Regulator (CER).
