= 2025 Tasmanian Labor Party leadership election =

- 20 August 2025
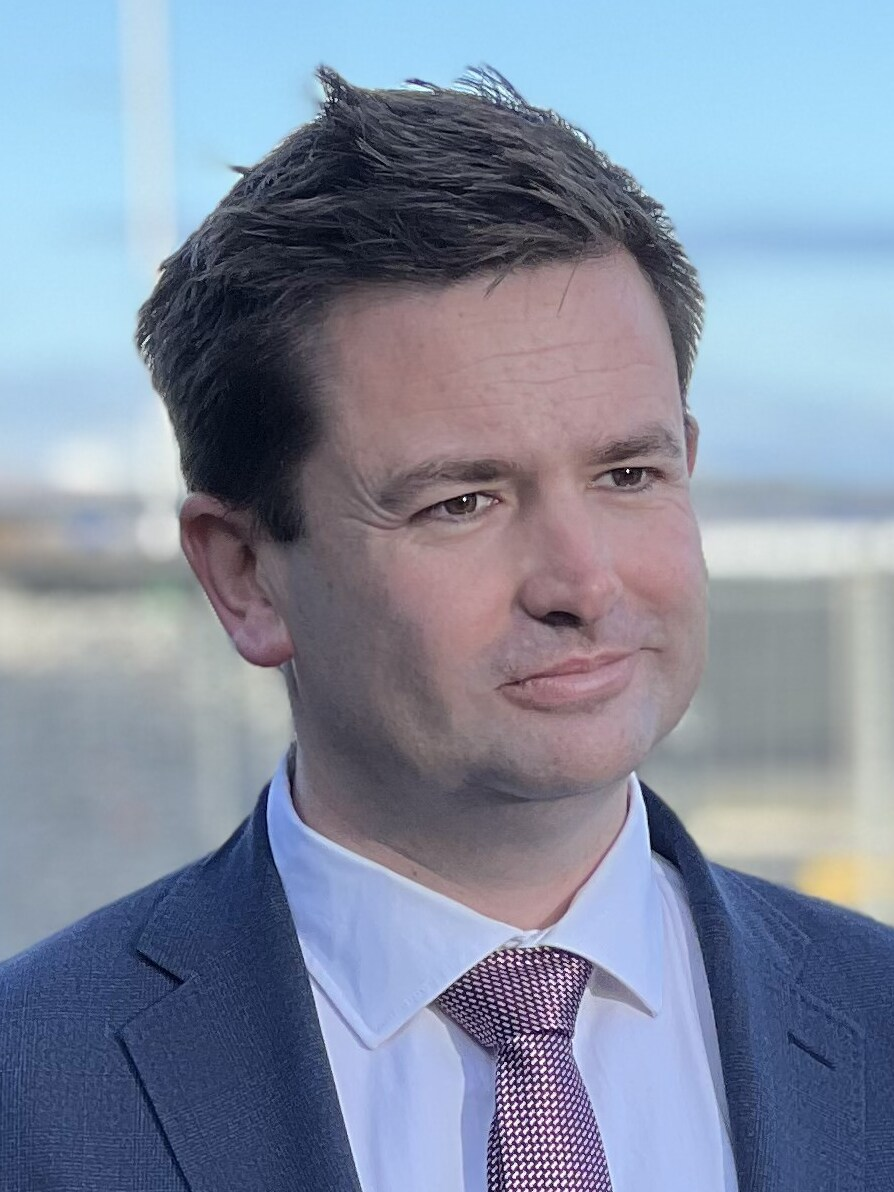

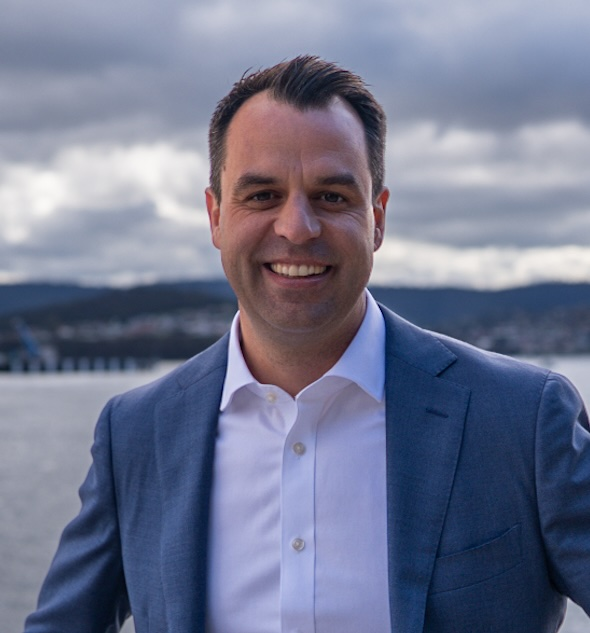
Candidate	Dean Winter	Josh Willie
First round	9	4
First	9	4
Final	Withdrew	Unopposed
Division	Franklin	Clark
Faction	Right	Left
Leader before election
Dean Winter
Right
Elected Leader
Josh Willie
Left

The 2025 Tasmanian Labor Party leadership election was held on 20 August 2025 to elect the leader of the Tasmanian Labor Party and, ex officio, Leader of the Opposition. The election took place after Labor lost the state election held on 19 July 2025, their fifth consecutive election loss.

Josh Willie was successful in his leadership bid, defeating Dean Winter. Janie Finlay was elected unopposed to replace Anita Dow as deputy leader.

== Leadership candidates and nomination ==
Labor Left is the largest faction within Tasmanian Labor. According to former leader Bryan Green, whoever the left nominates is likely to win the entire leadership election. Labor Left in Tasmania met on the morning of 20 August to decide who they would nominate for the party's leadership election.

=== Labor Left ===
==== Declared ====
- Josh Willie, member of the House of Assembly for Clark (2025–), member of the Legislative Council for Elwick (2016–2024) and Labor nominee for Leader of the House (2025).

==== Withdrawn ====
- Ella Haddad, member of the House of Assembly for Clark (2018–) and Labor nominee for Special Minister of State (2025).

=== Labor Right ===
Labor Right is the smaller of the two factions within Tasmanian Labor. Its sole candidate for the leadership election is Dean Winter, who threatened to 'blow up' the party if his leadership was challenged.

==== Declared ====
- Dean Winter, member of the House of Assembly for Franklin (2021–) and leader of the opposition (2024–).

== Results ==
Matthew Denholm of The Australian reported that Willie's four votes in the parliamentary Labor Party came from himself, Ella Haddad, Meg Brown, and Brian Mitchell.

== Deputy leadership ==
2025 Tasmanian Labor Party deputy leadership election
- 20 August 2025
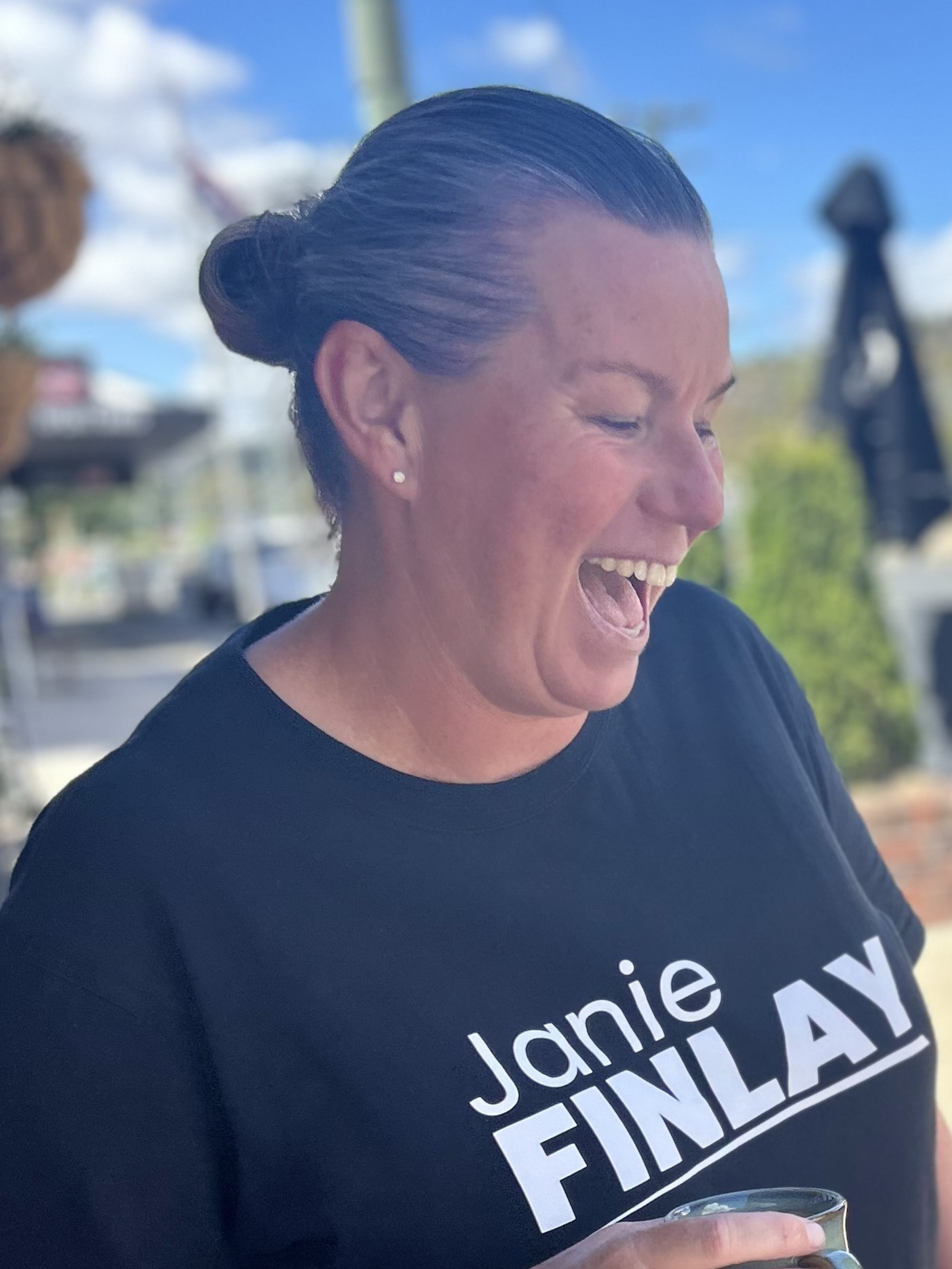
Candidate	Janie Finlay
Caucus vote	Unopposed
Seat	Franklin
Faction	Right
Deputy Leader before election
Anita Dow
Left
Elected Deputy Leader
Janie Finlay
Right

=== Candidates ===
==== Declared ====
- Janie Finlay, member of the House of Assembly for Bass (2021–) and mayor of Launceston (2002–2005).

==== Speculated ====
- Anita Dow, member of the House of Assembly for Braddon (2018–), deputy-leader of the opposition (2021–2025) and mayor of Burnie (2014–2017).
