= Terry Martin (producer) =

American television producer and journalist (c.1944–2019)

- Born: Terrence L. Martin c. 1944; San Antonio, Texas, US
- Died: April 1, 2019 (aged 75); Greenwich, Connecticut, US
- Education: Hobart College; Rutgers University; Columbia University Graduate School of Journalism
- Occupations: Television producer, journalist
- Children: 1

Terrence L. Martin (c. 1944 – April 1, 2019) was an American television producer and journalist for CBS.

== Biography ==
Martin was born c. 1944, in San Antonio, to Rev. James Martin and Helen Lord Martin. He attended Hobart College and was a member of Pi Gamma Mu and Phi Beta Kappa, also an editor of its newspaper, The Herald. He graduated in 1966, and later received a master's in European history from Rutgers University. He also studied at the Columbia University Graduate School of Journalism, which he later returned as a teaching aide to Fred W. Friendly, a former CBS executive.

Martin became a journalist in 1966, writing for the Home News Tribune. He worked for CBS News Radio from c. 1971, until his retirement in 2005. He transitioned to CBS News Mornings, which he served as associate producer for. He then became an associate, primary, and senior producer for CBS Evening News' weekend airings. He also produced the for CBS Special Events and CBS Productions, the latter he was an executive produced. In his career, he won for Emmy Awards. In his later career, Spy – a satirical magazine – described him as "one of the most intensely despised people in the news division" and that he would "berate his assistants wildly".

Martin's wife was journalist Lynne Jordal Martin, with who he had a daughter with. He died on April 1, 2019, aged 75, in Greenwich, Connecticut, of Alzheimer's disease.
