= 1928 Tasmanian state election =

State election in Australia

- 30 May 1928

All 30 seats to the House of Assembly
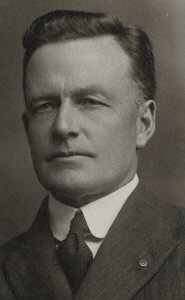

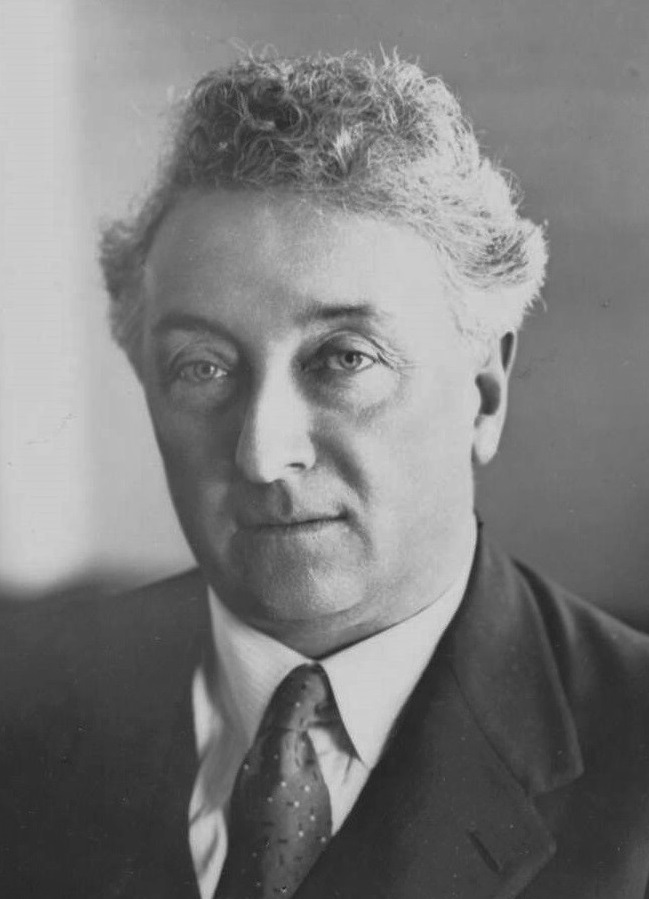
	First party	Second party
Leader	John McPhee	Joseph Lyons
Party	Nationalist	Labor
Leader since	July 1925	November 1916
Leader's seat	Denison	Wilmot
Last election	11 seats	16 seats
Seats won	15 seats	14 seats
Seat change	▲4	▼2
Percentage	42.20%	47.15%
Swing	▲2.83	▼1.32
- Results of the election
Premier before election
Joseph Lyons
Labor
Resulting Premier
John McPhee
Nationalist

The 1928 Tasmanian state election was held on Wednesday, 30 May 1928 in the Australian state of Tasmania to elect 30 members of the Tasmanian House of Assembly. The election used the Hare-Clark proportional representation system — six members were elected from each of five electorates.

Labor had won the 1925 election in a landslide, with the Nationalist Party losing five seats in the House of Assembly. In 1928, leading up to the election, the Nationalists reverted to "hard politics", criticising Labor Premier Joseph Lyons for an increasing unemployment problem and economic stagnation. This shift was much to the chagrin of Lyons, who had encouraged cordial relations with the Nationalists, and referred to their leader John McPhee as a "colleague and mate".

The Labor Party won the largest portion of the vote in the 1928 election, but only fourteen seats. The Nationalist Party held 15 seats, half of the seats in the House of Assembly, and as well had the support of the one elected Independent member, so Nationalist leader McPhee became Premier of Tasmania. He praised Lyons for his statesmanship. The wrong-winner election was likely at least partly caused the use of districts that had an even number of seats. In 1928, the Labor party received either an absolute or relative majority over the Nationalist party in state-wide vote tallies and also in each of the five electorates, yet the Nationalists took more seats. According to Dr. George Howatt, this occurred because the Labor majorities were not large enough to gain the fourth seat in any electorate, and in most districts Nationalists also got three seats. In one electorate (Franklin), an independent candidate Mr. B.J. Pearsall was elected, causing Labor to capture only two seats in that division. Despite Labor's lead over the Nationalists in popular votes, Labor lost to the Nationalists by 14 seats to 15. Plus Pearsall supported the Nationalists in Government. Howatt presented evidence in the 1950s that the use of districts with an odd number of seats, in particular 7, would be unlikely to produce wrong-winner elections. Tasmania switched to five-seat districts in 1959.

Lyons stood for the federal seat of Wilmot in 1929, and he became Prime Minister of Australia in 1932.

== Results ==
Party	Votes	%	+/–	Seats	+/–
Labor	41,829	47.16	-1.32	14	▼2
Nationalist^{[a]}	37,432	42.20	+2.83	15	▲4
Independents	7,461	8.41	-0.30	1	▼2
Independent Labor	1,982	2.23	-1.22	0	Steady
Total	88,704	100.00	–	30	–
Valid votes	88,704	96.76			
Invalid/blank votes	2,973	3.24	+1.02		
Total votes	91,677	100.00	–		
Registered voters/turnout	111,956	81.89	+14.63		

Popular vote
Labor	47.15%
Nationalist	42.20%
Independents	10.65%

Seats
Nationalist	50.00%
Labor	46.67%
Independents	3.33%

^{a} Prior to the 1925 election, the Nationalist Party had split with a number of candidates, including former Premier Walter Lee, contesting the election under a "Liberal" banner. The grouping subsequently reunited with the Nationalists.

== Distribution of votes ==
=== Primary vote by division ===
	Bass	Darwin	Denison	Franklin	Wilmot
Labor Party	54.6%	46.7%	40.9%	43.5%	50.9%
Nationalist	45.4%	45.7%	40.4%	37.4%	42.0%
Other	–	7.5%	18.7%	19.1%	7.0%

=== Distribution of seats ===
Electorate	Seats won
Bass	
Darwin	
Denison	
Franklin	
Wilmot	

Labor
Nationalist
Independent

== See also ==
- Members of the Tasmanian House of Assembly, 1928–1931
- Candidates of the 1928 Tasmanian state election
