= Damon Thomas (politician) =

Australian public official (born 1949)

Damon Thomas AM

67th Lord Mayor of Hobart
- In office 25 October 2011 – 5 November 2014
- Deputy: Ron Christie
- Preceded by: Rob Valentine
- Succeeded by: Sue Hickey

Personal details
- Born: 27 October 1949 (age 76) Hobart, Tasmania, Australia
- Party: Independent
- Education: University of Queensland (LLM)

Damon Christopher Thomas (born 27 October 1949) is the former Lord Mayor of Hobart from 2011 to 2014. He continued to serve as an Alderman of the City of Hobart until failing to win re-election in 2022.

Thomas had a range of previous appointments, including Tasmanian Crown Solicitor, State Ombudsman, CEO of the Tasmanian Chamber of Commerce and Industry and Korean Consul. Thomas has Bachelor of Arts, Bachelor of Laws and Master of Laws degrees from the University of Queensland, and a Diploma of Company Administration from the University of New England. He is a Fellow of the Australian Institute of Management.

Thomas was appointed a Member of the Order of Australia in the 2026 King's Birthday Honours in recognition of his "significant service to local government, to the law, and to the community of Tasmania".

Civic offices
Preceded by Rob Valentine	Lord Mayor of Hobart; 2011–2014	Succeeded by Sue Hickey
