= Bec Thomas =

Australian politician

The Honourable Bec Thomas MLC

Member of the Tasmanian Legislative Council for Elwick
- Incumbent
- Assumed office 4 May 2024
- Preceded by: Josh Willie

Mayor of Glenorchy City Council
- In office 21 July 2021 – 4 May 2024
- Preceded by: Kristie Johnston
- Succeeded by: Sue Hickey

Personal details
- Born: 24 December 1983 (age 42) Hobart, Australia
- Party: Independent

Rebecca Jane Thomas (born 24 December 1983) is an Australian politician representing Elwick in the Tasmanian Legislative Council since the 2024 Tasmanian Legislative Council periodic election. Prior to this she was Mayor of Glenorchy and a member of Glenorchy City Council.

Civic offices
Preceded by Kristie Johnston	Mayor of Glenorchy; 2021–2024	Succeeded by Sue Hickey
Tasmanian Legislative Council
Preceded by Josh Willie	Member for Elwick; 2024–present	Incumbent
