= David Crean =

Australian politician (born 1950)

Dr David Crean

Member of the Tasmanian House of Assembly for Denison
- In office 13 May 1989 – 1 February 1992

Member of the Tasmanian Legislative Council for Buckingham
- In office 23 May 1992 – 31 July 1999
- Preceded by: Doug Lowe
- Succeeded by: Seat abolished

Member of the Tasmanian Legislative Council for Elwick
- In office 31 July 1999 – 1 May 2004
- Preceded by: Seat created
- Succeeded by: Terry Martin

Personal details
- Born: 21 November 1950 (age 75) Melbourne, Victoria, Australia
- Party: Labor Party
- Domestic partner: Sue Mackay
- Parent: Frank Crean (father)
- Relatives: Simon Crean (brother)
- Profession: Medical doctor

David Mackenzie Crean (born 21 November 1950, Melbourne) is a former Labor member of the Parliament of Tasmania. He is the son of former Deputy Prime Minister Frank Crean and brother to former Australian federal opposition leader Simon Crean.

Before entering politics, Crean was a medical doctor in Hobart, where he started the city's first after-hours medical locum practice with his business partner, future federal opposition leader Brendan Nelson. His first wife was Jill Robson, daughter of fellow politician Neil Robson.

Crean entered the House of Assembly at the 1989 election in the division of Denison. He was defeated at the 1992 election held in February 1992. In May 1992 he was elected to the Legislative Council in the division of Buckingham (later becoming Elwick). Unusually for a member of the upper house, which cannot initiate money bills, he was Treasurer of Tasmania from September 1998 to February 2004 in the ministry of Jim Bacon. He was also Minister for Employment from August 2002 to February 2004.

Crean announced his retirement on 1 February 2004 because of a kidney condition, stating that he would not contest his seat of Elwick when his term expired in May. He was Chair of Hydro Tasmania from September 2004 until his resignation in 2014. His partner is former senator Sue Mackay.

Tasmanian Legislative Council
Preceded by Doug Lowe	Member for Buckingham; 1992–1999	Abolished
New seat	Member for Elwick; 1999–2004	Succeeded by Terry Martin
