= 2012 Tasmanian Legislative Council periodic election =

Legislative election in Tasmania, Australia

← 2011	5 May 2012	2013 →

2 of the 15 seats in the Legislative Council 8 seats needed for a majority
	First party	Second party
Party	Independent	Labor
Seats before	1	1
Seats won	2	0
Seat change	▲1	▼1

Periodic elections for the Tasmanian Legislative Council were held on 5 May 2012. The two seats up for election were Hobart, held by retiring Labor MLC Doug Parkinson, and Western Tiers, held by independent MLC Greg Hall. These seats were last contested (under different names) in 2006.

== Hobart ==
The seat of Hobart, formerly known as Wellington, had been held by Doug Parkinson for the Labor Party since 1994; his retirement left Derwent MLC Craig Farrell as the only remaining Labor MLC. As his replacement Labor preselected Dean Winter, a party researcher and staffer for federal MP Julie Collins. His main competition was Rob Valentine, Lord Mayor of Hobart from 1999 to 2011, who was running as an independent candidate. Secondary school teacher Penelope Ann was selected by the Greens, while other independent candidates included engineering consultant James Sugden, former Liberal preselection candidate Paul Hiscutt (who contested Wellington in 2006, and whose father Hugh was an MLC from 1983 to 1995) and serial candidate John Forster.

=== Hobart Results ===
Tasmanian Legislative Council periodic elections, 2012: Hobart
Party	Candidate	Votes	%	±%
Independent	Rob Valentine	6,646	37.0	+37.0
Greens	Penelope Ann	3,935	22.6	–7.4
Labor	Dean Winter	3,347	19.2	−18.2
Independent	James Sugden	2,356	13.5	+13.5
Independent	Paul Hiscutt	768	4.4	–2.8
Independent	John Forster	547	3.1	+3.1
Total formal votes		17,399	96.9	+0.2
Informal votes		550	3.1	–0.2
Turnout		17,949	75.8	
Two-party-preferred result
Independent	Rob Valentine	10,617	62.5	+62.5
Greens	Penelope Ann	6,376	37.5	+0.2
Independent gain from Labor		Swing	N/A	

== Western Tiers ==
The seat of Western Tiers, renamed from Rowallan in 2006, had been held since 2001 by independent Greg Hall. His only opponent for re-election was another independent candidate, John Hawkins, an antiques dealer and environmental campaigner.

=== Western Tiers Results ===
Tasmanian Legislative Council periodic elections, 2012: Western Tiers
Party	Candidate	Votes	%	±%
Independent	Greg Hall	13,233	73.3	−8.6
Independent	John Hawkins	4,823	26.7	+26.7
Total formal votes		18,056	94.4	−0.2
Informal votes		1,080	5.6	+0.2
Turnout		19,136	81.5	
Independent hold		Swing	−8.6	
