= 2011 Tasmanian Legislative Council periodic election =

Legislative election in Tasmania, Australia

← 2010	7 May 2011	2012 →

4 of the 15 seats in the Legislative Council 8 seats needed for a majority
	First party	Second party
Party	Independent	Labor
Seats before	2	2
Seats won	3	1
Seat change	▲1	▼1

Periodic elections for the Tasmanian Legislative Council were held on 7 May 2011. The three seats up for election were Launceston, held by retiring independent MLC Don Wing; Murchison, held by independent MLC Ruth Forrest; and Rumney, held by Labor MLC Lin Thorp. These seats were last contested in 2005.

On the same day, a by-election was held for the seat of Derwent following the resignation of Labor MLC Michael Aird. Derwent was last contested in 2009.

== Launceston ==
The seat of Launceston, previously known as Paterson, had been held by Don Wing since 1982; the last time the seat was up for election, Wing was re-elected unopposed. His retirement left the seat vacant. One of the stronger Liberal areas in Tasmania, that party selected Sam McQuestin, the state party president, as their candidate. The Labor Party selected Steve Bishop, while Launceston Alderman Rosemary Armitage and businesswoman Lou Clark were independent candidates.

=== Launceston Results ===
Tasmanian Legislative Council periodic elections, 2011: Launceston
Party	Candidate	Votes	%	±%
Liberal	Sam McQuestin	6,575	34.00	+34.00
Independent	Rosemary Armitage	6,136	31.73	+31.73
Labor	Steve Bishop	3,815	19.73	+19.73
Independent	Lou Clark	2,811	14.54	+14.54
Total formal votes		19,337	96.64	N/A
Informal votes		673	3.36	N/A
Turnout		20,010	84.47	N/A
Two-candidate-preferred result
Independent	Rosemary Armitage	10,861	56.17	+56.17
Liberal	Sam McQuestin	8,476	43.83	+43.83
Independent hold		Swing	N/A	

== Murchison ==
Sitting independent MLC Ruth Forrest was the sole nominee for the election in Murchison, which she had held since 2005. She was thus declared re-elected unopposed.

=== Murchison Results ===
Tasmanian Legislative Council periodic elections, 2011: Murchison
Party	Candidate	Votes	%	±%
Independent	Ruth Forrest	unopposed		
Independent hold				

== Rumney ==
Rumney had been held since 1999 by Labor MLC and Children's Services Minister Lin Thorp, who was elected in 2005 with a primary vote majority. The only party to preselect an opponent was the Greens, who nominated schoolteacher Penelope Ann; however, Tony Mulder, an independent candidate, was a past candidate for the Liberal Party. Other independents included former Children's Commissioner Paul Mason, former Labor member Cate Clark, and business analyst and serial candidate John Forster.

=== Rumney Results ===
Tasmanian Legislative Council periodic elections, 2011: Rumney
Party	Candidate	Votes	%	±%
Labor	Lin Thorp	6,754	32.77	−18.18
Independent	Tony Mulder	5,839	28.33	+28.33
Independent	Paul Mason	3,114	15.11	+15.11
Greens	Penelope Ann	2,762	13.40	+1.15
Independent	Cate Clark	1,356	6.58	+6.58
Independent	John Forster	785	3.81	+3.81
Total formal votes		20,610	95.51	−0.78
Informal votes		968	4.49	+0.78
Turnout		21,578	85.33	−0.49
Two-party-preferred result
Independent	Tony Mulder	10,785	53.15	N/A
Labor	Lin Thorp	9,507	46.85	N/A
Independent gain from Labor		Swing	N/A	

== Derwent by-election ==
Labor MLC and Treasurer Michael Aird had held the seat of Derwent since 1995, and the seat had been in Labor hands since 1979. Aird announced his retirement on 9 November 2010 and formally resigned from the Legislative Council on 6 December 2010. As his replacement, Labor preselected Craig Farrell, the Deputy Mayor of Derwent Valley Council. The Greens selected Phillip Bingley, while independent candidates included retailer Ray Williams, Glenorchy Alderman Jenny Branch (a former Liberal Party candidate), and Central Highlands Councillor Deirdre Flint.

=== Derwent Results ===
Derwent state by-election, 2011
Party	Candidate	Votes	%	±%
Labor	Craig Farrell	7,595	38.60	−13.01
Independent	Jenny Branch	3,990	20.28	−13.18
Independent	Ray Williams	3,197	16.25	+16.25
Independent	Deirdre Flint	2,943	14.96	+14.96
Greens	Phillip Bingley	1,950	9.91	−5.02
Total formal votes		19,675	93.31	−2.44
Informal votes		1,410	6.69	+2.44
Turnout		21,085	84.66	+2.60
Two-party-preferred result
Labor	Craig Farrell	11,118	56.61	N/A
Independent	Jenny Branch	8,521	43.39	N/A
Labor hold		Swing	N/A	
