= Terry Martin Sr. =

Australian politician

Terence Norman Martin (22 July 1918 – September 2001) was an Australian politician.

He was born in Glenorchy, Tasmania. In 1964 he was elected to the Tasmanian House of Assembly as a Labor member for Franklin. He held the seat until he was defeated in 1969. His son, also named Terry, was a member of the Tasmanian Legislative Council from 2004 to 2010.
