= Electoral division of Elwick =

Tasmanian Legislative Council electoral division

Elwick Tasmania—Legislative Council
- Map showing the electoral division of Elwick, as of the 2017 periodic review.
- State: Tasmania
- Created: 1999
- MP: Bec Thomas
- Party: Independent
- Electors: 24,010 (January 2019)
- Area: 98 km^{2} (37.8 sq mi)
- Demographic: Inner-metropolitan
- Federal electorate: Clark
- Coordinates: 42.853°S 147.218°E
Electorates around Elwick:
Derwent	Derwent	River Derwent
Derwent	Elwick	River Derwent
Huon	Huon	Hobart

The electoral division of Elwick is one of the 15 electoral divisions in the Tasmanian Legislative Council. The division covers most of the municipality of Glenorchy.

The total area of the division is 98.37 square kilometres (37.98 sq mi).

As of 31 January 2019, there were 24,010 enrolled voters in the division.

== Members for Elwick ==
Image	Member	Party	Term	Notes
	David Crean (b. 1950)	Labor	31 July 1999 – 2 May 2004	Retired due to kidney condition
	Terry Martin (b. 1957)	Labor	2 May 2004 – 2007	Charged in 2009 with having sex with a 12-year-old girl. Did not seek re-election; convicted in 2011
	Terry Martin (b. 1957)	Independent	2007 – 1 May 2010	Charged in 2009 with having sex with a 12-year-old girl. Did not seek re-election; convicted in 2011
	Adriana Taylor (b. 1946)	Independent	1 May 2010 – 7 May 2016	Former mayor of Glenorchy. Lost re-election
	Josh Willie (b. 1984)	Labor	7 May 2016 – 27 February 2024	Resigned to contest 2024 state election. Currently MHA for Clark
	Bec Thomas	Independent	4 May 2024 – present	Former mayor of Glenorchy. Incumbent

== Election results ==
2024 Elwick state by-election
Party	Candidate	Votes	%	±%
Independent	Bec Thomas	6,208	33.93	+33.93
Labor	Tessa McLaughlin	5,194	28.39	–24.15
Greens	Janet Shelley	3,476	19.00	–2.06
Independent	Fabiano Cangelosi	3,417	18.66	+18.66
Total formal votes		18,295	95.73	–0.63
Informal votes		816	4.27	+0.63
Turnout		19,111	80.74	+2.71
Registered electors		23,669		
Two-candidate-preferred result
Independent	Bec Thomas	9,758	53.34	+53.34
Labor	Tessa McLaughlin	8,537	46.66	–5.88
Independent gain from Labor				

== See also ==
- Tasmanian House of Assembly
