= Helen Burnet =

Australian politician

Helen Burnet MP
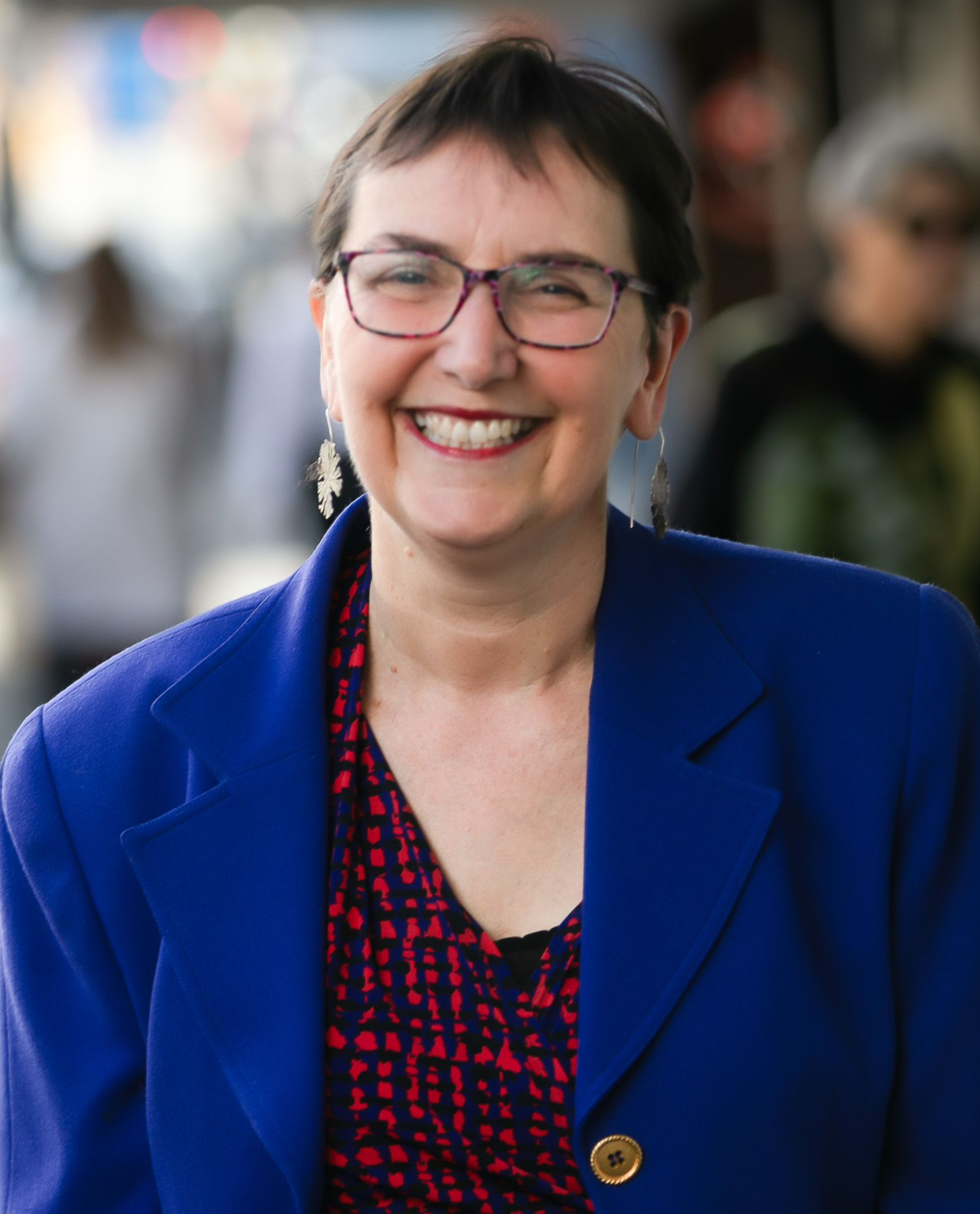

Chair of Committees Deputy-Speaker of the Tasmanian Parliament
- Incumbent
- Assumed office 19 August 2025
- Speaker: Jacquie Petrusma
- Preceded by: Nic Street

Member of the Tasmanian House of Assembly for Clark
- Incumbent
- Assumed office 23 March 2024 Serving with 6 others

Deputy Lord Mayor of Hobart
- In office 30 October 2018 – 23 March 2024
- Preceded by: Peter Sexton
- Succeeded by: Zelinda Sherlock
- In office 2009–2011
- Preceded by: Eva Ruzicka
- Succeeded by: Ron Christie

Councillor of the City of Hobart
- In office 10 March 2005 – 23 March 2024

Personal details
- Born: 12 December 1964 (age 61) Mount Barker, South Australia, Australia
- Party: Independent
- Other political affiliations: Greens (until 2026)
- Education: Diploma of Applied Science (Podiatry) – University of South Australia

Helen Christina Burnet (born 12 December 1964) is an Australian politician representing the division of Clark in the House of Assembly since the 2024 Tasmanian state election. Prior to this she was Deputy Lord Mayor of Hobart and a member of the Hobart City Council. Since August 2025, She has served as chair of committees, and ex officio, deputy-speaker of the Tasmanian House of Assembly.

== Political career ==
A longtime member of the Greens, Burnet unsuccessfully ran in the 2010 and 2018 Tasmanian state elections for the party. She was elected Deputy Lord Mayor of Hobart in 2009, 2018 and 2022.

In the 2010 Tasmanian state election and 2018 Tasmanian state election she unsuccessfully stood in Denison. She was also a candidate in the 2013 Australian Senate election. She was the Green candidate in Denison in the 2004 Australian federal election.

In the 2024 Tasmanian state election, Burnet was the second Greens member to be elected for Clark, after Vica Bayley.

Burnet was re-elected at the 2025 Tasmanian state election. Following the 2025 state election, Burnet was nominated by the Greens to the parliamentary office of Chair of Committees. She was in an election against Labor candidate Jen Butler, who had lost her election for the speakership in a landslide mere hours prior. Burnet was successful, receiving a vote of 21 to 12 votes. She left the Greens in January 2026, citing frustration around advocating for the issues of her constituents within the Greens.

== Personal life & education ==
Burnet is a registered podiatrist, having attained her degree, a Diploma of Applied Science in Podiatry from the University of South Australia in 1993. She is also a member of the Australian Institute of Company Directors.
