= Kristie Johnston =

Australian politician (born 1980)

Kristie Johnston MP

Member of the Tasmanian Parliament for Clark
- Incumbent
- Assumed office 1 May 2021 Serving with 6 others

Personal details
- Born: 22 December 1980 (age 45)
- Party: Independent
- Website: kristiejohnston.com.au

Kristie Joy Johnston (born 22 December 1980) is an Australian politician. She was elected as the Mayor of City of Glenorchy in 2014 and 2018 and is an independent member for the seat of Division of Clark, having been elected in the 2021 Tasmanian state election.

== Political career ==
Johnston was first elected in 2014 as the mayor of the City of Glenorchy, winning 59% of the vote against incumbent mayor Stuart Slade. In 2015, Johnston claimed that the city council had breached regulations by voting on making 16 employees redundant without her presence. Federal independent MP for the Division of Denison, Andrew Wilkie, who endorsed Johnston for mayor, criticised this as "puerile behaviour", saying that some aldermen were "sore losers" and trying to create an impression of chaos under Johnston's mayoralty. She was re-elected in 2018 as mayor, winning 86.4% of the vote.

In a press release on 27 February 2021, Johnston announced she would run for the seat of Clark in the next Tasmanian state election. A snap election was ultimately called a month later, with the election date set for 1 May 2021. After the counting of final preferences, Johnston won the final seat in Clark with 11% of the primary vote. Johnston's win was the first time an independent candidate had won a seat in the House of Assembly since Bruce Goodluck in 1996.

In March 2022 Johnston said of the Tasmanian Integrity Commission, that there is "snowball's chance in hell that this government will move to reform and strengthen the Integrity Commission in Tasmania".

Johnson was re-elected in the 2024 Tasmanian state election. Johnston provided the Rockliff Liberal Government with confidence and supply alongside all three members of the Jacqui Lambie Network and former-Labor leader and independent MP for Franklin, David O'Byrne. She was re-elected at the 2025 Tasmanian state election.

Civic offices
Preceded by Stuart Slade	Mayor of Glenorchy; 2014–2021	Succeeded by Bec Thomas
