= Rob Valentine =

Australian politician

66th Lord Mayor of Hobart
- In office 24 March 1999 – 25 October 2011
- Deputy: Helen Burnet
- Preceded by: John Freeman
- Succeeded by: Damon Thomas

Member of the Tasmanian Legislative Council for Hobart
- In office 5 May 2012 – 3 May 2024
- Preceded by: Doug Parkinson
- Succeeded by: Cassy O'Connor

Personal details
- Born: 15 June 1950 (age 75)
- Party: Independent

Robert Henry Francis Valentine (born 15 June 1950) is an Australian politician. He was the Lord Mayor of the City of Hobart local government area, in the State of Tasmania, Australia, from March 1999 to October 2011. In 2012, he was elected to the Tasmanian Legislative Council for the division of Hobart. He retired at the 2024 Tasmanian Legislative Council periodic election.

Valentine is the great-grandson of Francis David Valentine, who was Mayor from 1925 to 1926.

Valentine is also the great-nephew of Edward Brooker (a previous premier of Tasmania) and is the longest continuously-serving Lord Mayor in the History of Hobart (since 1853).

He was educated at Dunalley State School (Grd 1-6), Clarence High School, Hobart Matriculation College and the University of Tasmania.

Civic offices
Preceded by John Freeman	Lord Mayor of Hobart; 1999–2011	Succeeded by Damon Thomas
Tasmanian Legislative Council
Preceded by Doug Parkinson	Member for Hobart; 2012–2024	Succeeded by Cassy O'Connor
