= City of Glenorchy =

Glenorchy City Council
- Local government area
- Interactive map of Glenorchy City Council
- Coordinates: 42.839°S 147.2198°E
- Country: Australia
- State: Tasmania
- Region: Hobart northern suburbs
- Established: 1 January 1864
- Council seat: Glenorchy

Government
  - Mayor: Sue Hickey
  - State electorate: Clark
  - Federal division: Clark

Area
  - Total: 121.1 km^{2} (46.8 sq mi)

Population
  - Total: 50,411 (2021)
  - Density: 416.28/km^{2} (1,078.1/sq mi)
- County: Buckingham
- Website: Glenorchy City Council
LGAs around Glenorchy City Council
Derwent Valley	Brighton	Clarence
Derwent Valley	Glenorchy City Council	Clarence
Kingborough	Hobart	Hobart

Glenorchy City Council (or City of Glenorchy) is a local government body in Tasmania, and one of the five municipalities that constitutes the Greater Hobart Area. The Glenorchy local government area has a population of 50,411, covering the suburbs north of central Hobart on the western shore of the River Derwent, including its namesake suburb, Glenorchy.

== Mayors ==
Past mayors of the City of Glenorchy include:

- Terry Martin Sr. (1964–1965)
- Ken Lowrie (1965–1975)
- Dennis Fall (1975–1981)
- David Shields (1983–1990)
- Terry Martin (1990–2005)
- Adriana Taylor (2005–2011)
- Stuart Slade (2011–2014)
- Kristie Johnston (2014–2021)
- Bec Thomas (2021–2024)
- Sue Hickey (current)

== Elected members ==
The current elected members of the Glenorchy City Council include:

List of Council Members
Name	Position	Party affiliation	Elected
Sue Hickey	Mayor	Independent	2024 (Note: Sue Hickey was elected Mayor Glenorchy on Monday, 24 June 2024. She was previously elected Deputy Mayor Glenorchy in 2022, and elected Alderman 2021.)
Molly Kendall	Councillor (Note: The Local Government Act 1993 (Tasmania) defines 'councilors' a person elected to a council and with the position of 'Lord Mayor', 'Deputy Lord Mayor', 'mayor', 'deputy mayor', and 'alderman'. In the Glenorchy City Council meeting dated 26 April 2023, Alderman Molly Kendall raised a motion for all 'Aldermen' to be known as 'Councillors' rather than 'Aldermen'. The motion was lost, but it was noted that Alderman Molly Kendall and then Alderman Harry Quick would adopt the position title 'Councillor'.)	Tasmanian Greens	2022
Tim Marks	Alderman	Independent	2024
Steven King	Alderman	Independent	2008
Josh Cockshutt	Alderman	Liberal	2022
Peter Ridler	Alderman	Independent	2024
Russell Yaxley	Alderman	Independent	2022
Stuart Slade	Alderman	Independent	2022 (Note: Stuart Slade was elected Alderman on Monday, 31 October 2022. They were previously elected Mayor between October 2011 and October 2014, elected Deputy Mayor between November 1996 and November 2005, and first elected Alderman in 1991. They were not an elected member between 2017 and 2022 after being suspended by the Minister for Planning and Local Government for their involvement in what was later found by the Integrity Commission to be conflicts of interest and attempts to improperly gain pecuniary benefits of more than $1 million.)
Shane Alderton	Alderman	Independent	2023
Justin Stringer	Alderman	Independent	2024

== History ==
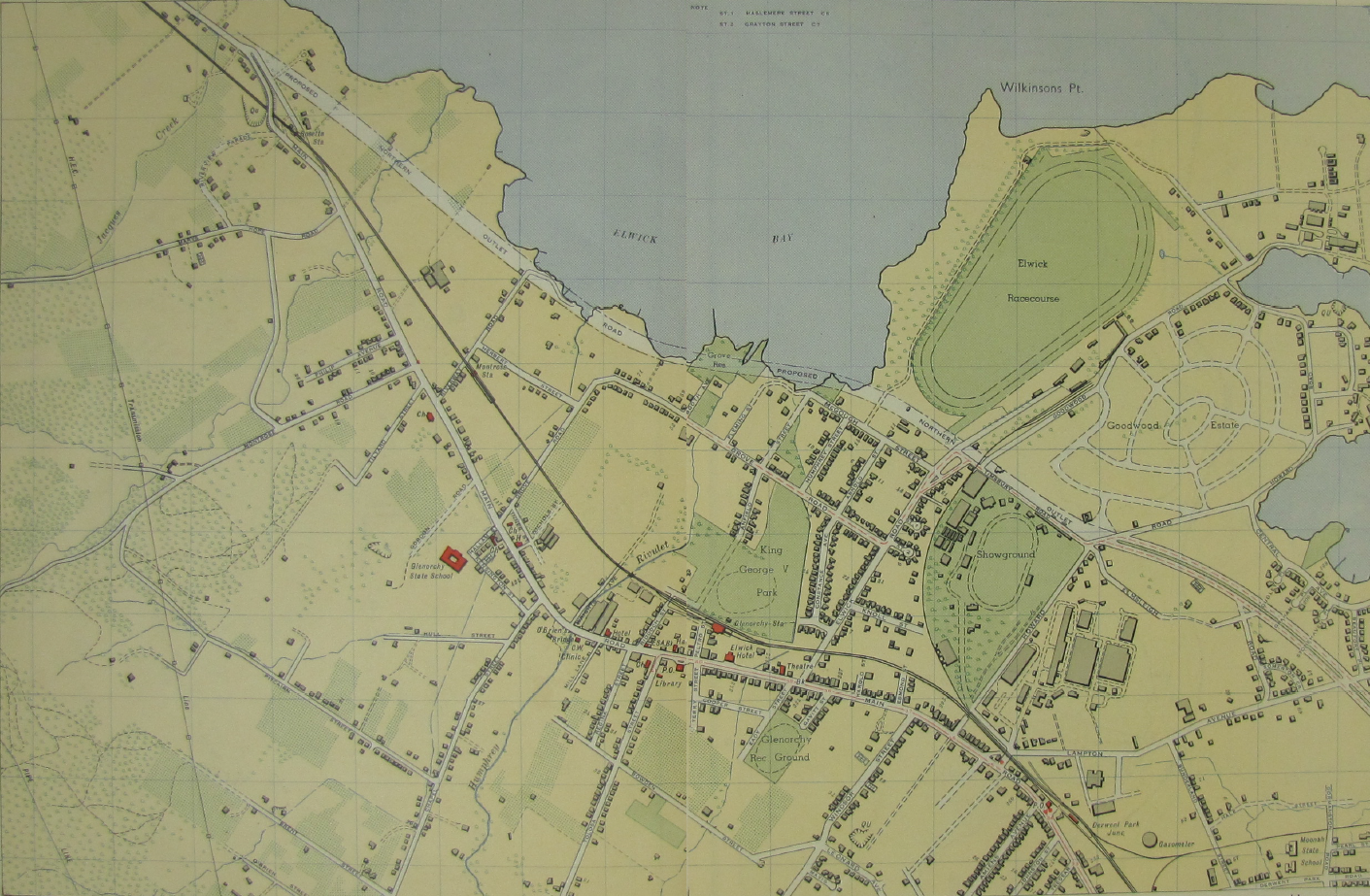
Central Glenorchy area in 1954

Tasmanian Aboriginals were the first inhabitants of the area where Glenorchy lies today. The first European to arrive in Glenorchy was a Frenchman, who was a member of Bruni d'Entrecasteaux's crew, in 1793. An English expedition arrived two months later, under the command of John Hayes. Hayes sailed up the river which he referred to as the Derwent. He named Prince of Wales Bay and called the area around New Town and Moonah King George's Plains. Hayes named the Glenorchy area as New Cumberland.

This French presence was the main influence in Lieutenant Governor Bowen's decision to settle where Hobart now exists.

The period between 1840 and 1860 was when steady growth was seen in Glenorchy, culminating in the area becoming a municipality in 1864. Glenorchy is believed to have been so named by governor Lachlan Macquarie after his wife's home in Scotland. The name means 'glen of tumbling waters'.

City status was given to Glenorchy on 24 October 1964, exactly one hundred years after it was first proclaimed a municipality.

== Geography ==
The city spans the area along the River Derwent, from just north of the Queens Domain in the south, to the Bridgewater Bridge in the north, and extends west as far as the foothills of Mount Wellington.

== Demographics ==
The greater Hobart area has a population of around 222,000 as at the 2016 census, with the city of Glenorchy local government area having a population of over 46,000. This makes Glenorchy the third most populated city in the greater area of Hobart.

Glenorchy is classified as urban, fringe and medium (UFM) under the Australian Classification of Local Governments.

=== Population ===
Year	Population
1865	1,300
1891	1,962
1901	2,392
1911	3,393
1921	6,344
1933	9,898
1947	14,493
1954	25,810
1964	38,400
1971	42,651
1976	42,437
1981	41,019
1986	38,202
2001	42,445
2006	43,413
2011	44,656
2016	46,253
2021	50,411

== Localities ==
=== Hobart suburbs ===
- Austins Ferry
- Berriedale
- Chigwell
- Claremont
- Collinsvale
- Derwent Park
- Dowsing Point
- Glenlusk
- Glenorchy
- Goodwood
- Granton
- Lutana
- Montrose
- Moonah
- Rosetta
- West Moonah

=== Other localities ===
- Lenah Valley
- New Town
- Wellington Park

== Road infrastructure ==
A greater proportion of all roads found within the boundaries of Glenorchy are owned by the city itself with the two exceptions being Goodwood Road and the Brooker Highway which are owned and maintained by the Tasmanian Government.

== Culture ==
=== Events ===
The city hosts several annual events, including a regatta at Montrose Bay while at the showgrounds there is the annual Royal Hobart Show and the Hobart Cup at Tattersalls Park.

=== Entertainment ===
Glenorchy has a huge amount of entertainment to offer, considering its size. Located on the main road there is the only ice rink in the greater area of Hobart, as well as a Village Cinemas complex at Glenorchy Central and a Zone Bowling center at Moonah and located in Derwent Park is Parsons Sports Centre which houses Hobart's only indoor Tennis court.

The Derwent Entertainment Centre provides the city with the opportunity to host many local and international artists. Artists who have played here include Dire Straits, INXS, Elton John, John Farnham, Kylie Minogue and Bob Dylan. The DEC is also used for expos, trade shows and sporting events.

The Moorilla Estate often holds musical performances during the period of summer. Artists who have played at this venue include Grinspoon, Paul Kelly and The Pretenders.

The Museum of Old and New Art (MONA) opened on the Moorilla estate in 2011, and quickly became a popular tourist attraction.

=== Sport ===
KGV Oval is just one of the places where sport is played seriously within the city.

== Education ==
Senior secondary colleges and high schools in the Glenorchy area include St Virgil's College located in Austin's Ferry; Montrose Bay High School located in Rosetta; Cosgrove High School, Dominic College and Guilford Young College located close to the city centre; and Claremont College slightly to the north at Claremont.

== Shopping and retail ==
The City of Glenorchy has the second largest shopping district in southern Tasmania (the largest being in Hobart).The city has three major commercial areas: Moonah, Glenorchy CBD and Claremont. Claremont has one main shopping centre (Claremont Village) and a few retail outlets. Moonah has a shopping strip with a variety of small shops and cafes, as well as a Harris Scarfe department store and Woolworths supermarket. The Glenorchy CBD has three major indoor shopping centres, Northgate Shopping Centre, Glenorchy Central (Centro), and Glenorchy Plaza.

== See also ==
- List of local government areas of Tasmania
