= Josh Willie =

Australian politician (born 1984)

The Honourable Josh Willie MP
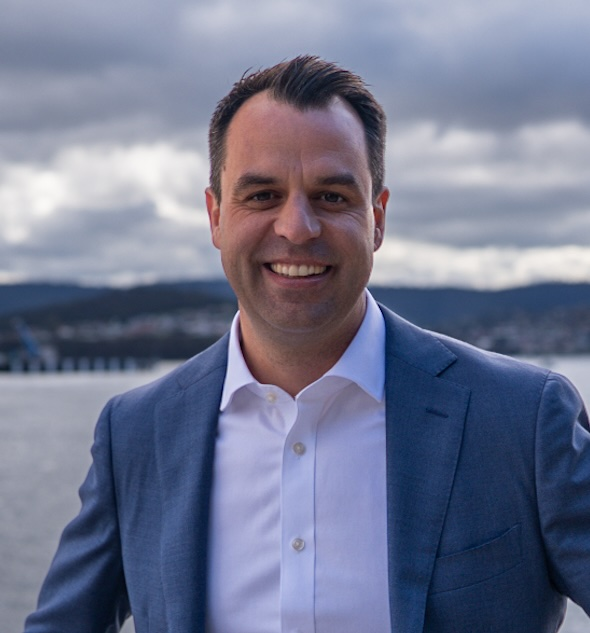

Leader of the Opposition in Tasmania
- Incumbent
- Assumed office 20 August 2025
Shadow portfolios Since 2025
Willie Shadow Ministry
2025–	Shadow Minister for Economic Development
2025–	Shadow Minister for Education and Early Years
- Premier: Jeremy Rockliff
- Deputy: Janie Finlay
- Preceded by: Dean Winter

Leader of the Tasmanian Labor Party
- Incumbent
- Assumed office 20 August 2025
- Deputy: Janie Finlay
- Preceded by: Dean Winter

Member of the Tasmanian House of Assembly for Clark
- Incumbent
- Assumed office 23 March 2024

Member of the Tasmanian Legislative Council for Elwick
- In office 7 May 2016 – 27 February 2024
- Preceded by: Adriana Taylor
- Succeeded by: Bec Thomas

Personal details
- Born: Joshua Barton Willie; 14 January 1984 (age 42) Launceston, Tasmania
- Party: Labor
- Profession: Teacher

Joshua Barton Willie (born 14 January 1984) is an Australian politician currently serving as leader of the Tasmanian Labor Party. He has been one of seven members for Clark in the Tasmanian House of Assembly since the state election in March 2024. Before being elected to the lower house, Willie was the member for Elwick in the Tasmanian Legislative Council from May 2016 to February 2024.

== Early life and education ==
Willie was the grandson of Alf and Mary who ran a 132-year-old fourth-generation family engineering business. He also came from a family of teachers and his parents were trained as teachers. He pursued teaching in his studies and graduated from the University of Tasmania with a Bachelor of Teaching and a Bachelor of Arts majoring in political science and journalism. He then became a primary school teacher in Hobart's northern suburbs until he was elected to state parliament.

Willie is married with three children.

== Political career ==
Willie was first elected to the Tasmanian Legislative Council in Elwick on 7 May 2016 defeating independent MLC Adriana Taylor in a win described by media as a surprise victory. The support of a party against an independent, claims 11,000 homes were door knocked, support for bus timetable changes, his younger age and historic Labor support in the suburb of Glenorchy were some of the reasons given for his victory. Willie was re-elected in the 2022 elections.

He announced on the 26 November 2023 that he would run in the next state election in the seat of Clark to help Labor gain back a second seat in the electorate. After the 2024 Tasmanian state election was announced, he resigned on 27 February 2024. Willie won in Clark at the state election, however the by-election for Elwick was lost to independent and former Mayor of Glenorchy Bec Thomas. Willie was re-elected at the 2025 Tasmanian state election.

== Opposition leader (2025–) ==
In August 2025, following a failed motion of no confidence in the Rockliff government in the aftermath of the 2025 Tasmanian state election, Willie was elected unanimously to replace Dean Winter as leader of the party. Other reports indicated that Willie initially lost a vote of the Labor caucus 9 to 4 to Winter, before Winter later stood aside before the outcome was to be decided by a ballot of Labor MPs and rank and file members, allowing Willie to be elected unanimously. It was reported that Ella Haddad, Meg Brown and Brian Mitchell were the 3 other votes for Willie besides himself.

Political offices
Preceded by Dean Winter	Leader of the Opposition (Tasmania); 2025–present	Incumbent
Party political offices
Preceded by Dean Winter	Leader of the Labor Party in Tasmania; 2025–present	Incumbent
Tasmanian Legislative Council
Preceded by Adriana Taylor	Member for Elwick; 2016–2024	Succeeded by Bec Thomas
