= Division of Clark (state) =

State electoral division of Tasmania, Australia

Coordinates: 42.8880°S 147.2440°E

Clark Tasmania—House of Assembly
- Interactive map of boundaries since the 2021 state election
- State: Tasmania
- Created: 2018 (Clark); 1909 (Denison)
- MP: Vica Bayley (Greens); Marcus Vermey (Liberal); Helen Burnet (independent); Ella Haddad (Labor); Kristie Johnston (independent); Madeleine Ogilvie (Liberal); Josh Willie (Labor)
- Party: Labor (2), Liberal (2), independent (2), Greens (1)
- Namesake: Andrew Inglis Clark
- Electors: 74,397 (2018)
- Area: 292.62 km^{2} (113.0 sq mi)
- Demographic: Inner metropolitan
- Federal electorate: Clark
- State electorate(s): Derwent; Elwick; Hobart; Huon; Nelson
Electorates around Clark:
Lyons	Lyons	Lyons
Lyons; Franklin	Clark	Storm Bay
Franklin	Franklin	Storm Bay

Map showing the Division of Denison, as of the 2018 Tasmanian state election.

The electoral division of Clark, formerly known as the electoral division of Denison is one of the five electorates in the Tasmanian House of Assembly, it is located in Hobart on the western shore of the River Derwent and includes the suburbs below Mount Wellington. Clark is named after Andrew Inglis Clark, a Tasmanian jurist who was the principal author of the Australian Constitution. The electorate shares its name and boundaries with the federal division of Clark.

The electorate was renamed from the electoral division of Denison in September 2018. Denison was named after Sir William Denison, who was Lieutenant Governor of Van Diemen's Land (1847–55), and Governor of New South Wales (1855–61). The renaming of the electorate to Clark was in line with the renaming of the federal division of Denison to Clark.

Clark and the other House of Assembly electoral divisions are each represented by seven members elected under the Hare-Clark electoral system (also named after Andrew Inglis Clark).

== History and electoral profile ==
Clark was renamed from the Denison when amendments to the Tasmanian Constitution Act 1934 gained Royal Assent on 28 September 2018, aligning Tasmania's state electoral divisions with the federal divisions which had undergone a boundary redistribution, including renaming Denison to Clark, and was formally gazetted on 14 November 2017.

The division is located on the western side of the River Derwent, covering a part of Kingborough and all of the Hobart and Glenorchy local government areas. Covering an area of 292.26 km^{2} it is the smallest of Tasmania's five electoral divisions.

== Representation ==
=== Distribution of seats ===
As 6-member seat:
Election	Seats won
1909–1912	
1912–1913	
1913–1916	
1916–1919	
1919–1922	
1922–1925	
1925–1928	
1928–1931	
1931–1934	
1934–1937	
1937–1941	
1941–1946	
1946–1948	
1948–1950	
1950–1955	
1955–1956	
1956–1959	

As 7-member seat:
Election	Seats won
1959–1964	
1964–1969	
1969–1972	
1972–1976	
1976–1979	
1979–1982	
1982–1986	
1986–1989	
1989–1992	
1992–1996	
1996–1998	

As 5-member seat:
Election	Seats won
1998–2002	
2002–2006	
2006–2010	
2010–2014	
2014–2018	
2018–2021	
2021–2024	

As 7-member seat:
Election	Seats won
2024–2025	
2025–	

Legend:
Labor
Liberal
Greens
Nationalist
Liberal
Anti-Socialist
Democrats
Independent

=== Members for Clark and Denison ===
Year	Member	Party	Member	Party	Member	Party	Member	Party	Member	Party	Member	Party	Member	Party
1909	Sir John Davies	Anti-Socialist	Walter Woods	Labor	William Sheridan	Labor	Sir Elliott Lewis	Anti-Socialist	Frederick Rattle	Anti-Socialist	Edward Crowther	Anti-Socialist	6 seats (1909–1959)	
1912	Sir John Davies	Liberal	Walter Woods	Labor	William Sheridan	Labor	Sir Elliott Lewis	Liberal	Vincent Barker	Labor	Francis Valentine	Liberal	6 seats (1909–1959)	
1913	Sir John Davies	Liberal	Walter Woods	Labor	Lyndhurst Giblin	Labor	Sir Elliott Lewis	Liberal	Vincent Barker	Labor	William Fullerton	Liberal	6 seats (1909–1959)	
1914	William Sheridan	Labor	Walter Woods	Labor	Lyndhurst Giblin	Labor	Sir Elliott Lewis	Liberal	Vincent Barker	Labor	William Fullerton	Liberal	6 seats (1909–1959)	
1916	William Sheridan	Labor	Walter Woods	Labor	John Cleary	Labor	Sir Elliott Lewis	Liberal	William Burgess	Liberal	William Fullerton	Liberal	6 seats (1909–1959)	
1917	William Sheridan	Labor	Charles Hoggins	Nationalist	John Cleary	Labor	Sir Elliott Lewis	Nationalist	George Foster	Nationalist	William Fullerton	Nationalist	6 seats (1909–1959)	
1919	William Sheridan	Labor	Robert Cosgrove	Labor	John Cleary	Labor	Sir Elliott Lewis	Nationalist	John McPhee	Nationalist	Robert Snowden	Nationalist	6 seats (1909–1959)	
1922	William Sheridan	Labor	Charles Grant	Nationalist	John Cleary	Labor	Charles Culley	Labor	John McPhee	Nationalist	Robert Snowden	Nationalist	6 seats (1909–1959)	
1924	William Sheridan	Labor	Charles Grant	Nationalist	John Cleary	Labor	Charles Culley	Labor	John McPhee	Nationalist	Leslie Payne	Nationalist	6 seats (1909–1959)	
1925	Robert Cosgrove	Labor	Walter Woods	Labor	John Cleary	Labor	Charles Culley	Labor	John McPhee	Nationalist	John Soundy	Nationalist	6 seats (1909–1959)	
1928	Robert Cosgrove	Labor	Walter Woods	Labor	Charles Grant	Nationalist	Edmund Dwyer-Gray	Labor	John McPhee	Nationalist	John Soundy	Nationalist	6 seats (1909–1959)	
1931	Gerald Mahoney	Labor	Ernest Turner	Nationalist	Charles Grant	Nationalist	Edmund Dwyer-Gray	Labor	John McPhee	Nationalist	John Soundy	Nationalist	6 seats (1909–1959)	
1932	Gerald Mahoney	Labor	Ernest Turner	Nationalist	Arndell Lewis	Nationalist	Edmund Dwyer-Gray	Labor	John McPhee	Nationalist	John Soundy	Nationalist	6 seats (1909–1959)	
1934	Robert Cosgrove	Labor	Ernest Turner	Nationalist	Charles Culley	Labor	Edmund Dwyer-Gray	Labor	George Carruthers	Independent	John Soundy	Nationalist	6 seats (1909–1959)	
1937	Robert Cosgrove	Labor	Francis Heerey	Labor	Charles Culley	Labor	Edmund Dwyer-Gray	Labor	Arndell Lewis	Nationalist	John Soundy	Nationalist	6 seats (1909–1959)	
1941	Robert Cosgrove	Labor	Francis Heerey	Labor	Charles Culley	Labor	Edmund Dwyer-Gray	Labor	Ernest Turner	Nationalist	John Soundy	Nationalist	6 seats (1909–1959)	
1941	Robert Cosgrove	Labor	Alfred White	Labor	Charles Culley	Labor	Edmund Dwyer-Gray	Labor	Charles Atkins	Nationalist	John Soundy	Nationalist	6 seats (1909–1959)	
1945	Robert Cosgrove	Labor	Alfred White	Labor	Charles Culley	Labor	Francis Heerey	Labor	Charles Atkins	Nationalist	John Soundy	Nationalist	6 seats (1909–1959)	
1946	Robert Cosgrove	Labor	Alfred White	Labor	Charles Culley	Labor	Francis Heerey	Labor	Charles Atkins	Nationalist	Robert Harvey	Nationalist	6 seats (1909–1959)	
1946	Robert Cosgrove	Labor	Alfred White	Labor	Charles Culley	Labor	Horace Strutt	Liberal	Charles Atkins	Liberal	Rex Townley	Independent	6 seats (1909–1959)	
1948	Robert Cosgrove	Labor	Alfred White	Labor	Henry Hope	Labor	Horace Strutt	Liberal	Bill Wedd	Independent	Rex Townley	Independent	6 seats (1909–1959)	
1950	Robert Cosgrove	Labor	Alfred White	Labor	Frank Gaha	Labor	Horace Strutt	Liberal	Bill Wedd	Independent	Rex Townley	Liberal	6 seats (1909–1959)	
1953	Robert Cosgrove	Labor	Alfred White	Labor	Frank Gaha	Labor	Horace Strutt	Liberal	Leo McPartlan	Independent	Rex Townley	Liberal	6 seats (1909–1959)	
1955	Robert Cosgrove	Labor	Alfred White	Labor	Frank Gaha	Labor	Horace Strutt	Liberal	Bill Hodgman	Liberal	Rex Townley	Liberal	6 seats (1909–1959)	
1958	Eric Howroyd	Labor	Alfred White	Labor	Frank Gaha	Labor	Horace Strutt	Liberal	Bill Hodgman	Liberal	Rex Townley	Liberal	6 seats (1909–1959)	
1959	Eric Howroyd	Labor	Bert Lacey	Labor	Frank Gaha	Labor	Horace Strutt	Liberal	Bill Hodgman	Liberal	Rex Townley	Liberal	6 seats (1909–1959)	
1959	Harry McLoughlin	Labor	Charley Aylett	Labor	Frank Gaha	Labor	Bill Wedd	Independent	Bill Hodgman	Liberal	Rex Townley	Liberal	Sir Archibald Park	Liberal
1959	Harry McLoughlin	Labor	Charley Aylett	Labor	Frank Gaha	Labor	Bill Wedd	Independent	Bill Hodgman	Independent	Rex Townley	Liberal	Horace Strutt	Liberal
1964	Harry McLoughlin	Labor	Charley Aylett	Independent	Frank Gaha	Labor	Bill Wedd	Independent	Bill Hodgman	Independent	Rex Townley	Liberal	Horace Strutt	Liberal
1964	Harry McLoughlin	Labor	Ken Austin	Labor	Merv Everett	Labor	Nigel Abbott	Liberal	Robert Mather	Liberal	Rex Townley	Liberal	Horace Strutt	Liberal
1965	Harry McLoughlin	Labor	Ken Austin	Labor	Merv Everett	Labor	Nigel Abbott	Liberal	Robert Mather	Liberal	George Brown	Liberal	Horace Strutt	Liberal
1969	Neil Batt	Labor	Ken Austin	Labor	Merv Everett	Labor	Nigel Abbott	Liberal	Robert Mather	Liberal	Bob Baker	Liberal	Max Bingham	Liberal
1972	Neil Batt	Labor	Ken Austin	Labor	Merv Everett	Labor	Kevin Corby	Labor	Robert Mather	Liberal	Bob Baker	Liberal	Max Bingham	Liberal
1974	Neil Batt	Labor	Ken Austin	Labor	Ian Cole	Labor	John Green	Labor	Robert Mather	Liberal	Bob Baker	Liberal	Max Bingham	Liberal
1976	Neil Batt	Labor	Julian Amos	Labor	Max Robinson	Liberal	John Green	Labor	Robert Mather	Liberal	Bob Baker	Liberal	Max Bingham	Liberal
1979	Neil Batt	Labor	Julian Amos	Labor	John Devine	Labor	John Green	Labor	Robert Mather	Liberal	Bob Baker	Liberal	Max Bingham	Liberal
1980	Norm Sanders	Democrats	Julian Amos	Labor	John Devine	Labor	Bob Graham	Labor	Robert Mather	Liberal	Gabriel Haros	Liberal	Max Bingham	Liberal
1982	Norm Sanders	Democrats	Julian Amos	Labor	John Devine	Labor	Geoff Davis	Liberal	Peter Walker	Liberal	Gabriel Haros	Liberal	Max Bingham	Liberal
1983	Bob Brown	Independent Greens	Julian Amos	Labor	John Devine	Labor	Geoff Davis	Liberal	Peter Walker	Liberal	Gabriel Haros	Liberal	Max Bingham	Liberal
1984	Bob Brown	Independent Greens	Julian Amos	Labor	Bob Graham	Labor	Geoff Davis	Liberal	Peter Walker	Liberal	Gabriel Haros	Liberal	Carmel Holmes	Liberal
1986	Bob Brown	Independent Greens	Julian Amos	Labor	Bob Graham	Labor	Geoff Davis	Liberal	Peter Walker	Liberal	Gabriel Haros	Independent	Carmel Holmes	Liberal
1986	Bob Brown	Independent Greens	Neil Batt	Labor	Judy Jackson	Labor	Geoff Davis	Liberal	Ray Groom	Liberal	John White	Labor	John Bennett	Liberal
1987	Bob Brown	Independent Greens	Neil Batt	Labor	Judy Jackson	Labor	John Barker	Liberal	Ray Groom	Liberal	John White	Labor	John Bennett	Liberal
1989	Bob Brown	Greens	David Crean	Labor	Judy Jackson	Labor	John Barker	Liberal	Ray Groom	Liberal	John White	Labor	John Bennett	Liberal
1990	Bob Brown	Greens	David Crean	Labor	Judy Jackson	Labor	John Barker	Liberal	Ray Groom	Liberal	John White	Labor	Chris Gibson	Liberal
1992	Bob Brown	Greens	Julian Amos	Labor	Judy Jackson	Labor	John Barker	Liberal	Ray Groom	Liberal	John White	Labor	Michael Hodgman	Liberal
1993	Peg Putt	Greens	Julian Amos	Labor	Judy Jackson	Labor	John Barker	Liberal	Ray Groom	Liberal	John White	Labor	Michael Hodgman	Liberal
1996	Peg Putt	Greens	Jim Bacon	Labor	Judy Jackson	Labor	Bob Cheek	Liberal	Ray Groom	Liberal	John White	Labor	Michael Hodgman	Liberal
1998	Peg Putt	Greens	Jim Bacon	Labor	Judy Jackson	Labor	Bob Cheek	Liberal	Ray Groom	Liberal	5 seats (1998–2024)			
2001	Peg Putt	Greens	Jim Bacon	Labor	Judy Jackson	Labor	Bob Cheek	Liberal	Michael Hodgman	Liberal	5 seats (1998–2024)			
2002	Peg Putt	Greens	Jim Bacon	Labor	Judy Jackson	Labor	Graeme Sturges	Labor	Michael Hodgman	Liberal	5 seats (1998–2024)			
2004	Peg Putt	Greens	David Bartlett	Labor	Judy Jackson	Labor	Graeme Sturges	Labor	Michael Hodgman	Liberal	5 seats (1998–2024)			
2006	Peg Putt	Greens	David Bartlett	Labor	Lisa Singh	Labor	Graeme Sturges	Labor	Michael Hodgman	Liberal	5 seats (1998–2024)			
2008	Cassy O'Connor	Greens	David Bartlett	Labor	Lisa Singh	Labor	Graeme Sturges	Labor	Michael Hodgman	Liberal	5 seats (1998–2024)			
2010	Cassy O'Connor	Greens	David Bartlett	Labor	Scott Bacon	Labor	Matthew Groom	Liberal	Elise Archer	Liberal	5 seats (1998–2024)			
2011	Cassy O'Connor	Greens	Graeme Sturges	Labor	Scott Bacon	Labor	Matthew Groom	Liberal	Elise Archer	Liberal	5 seats (1998–2024)			
2014	Cassy O'Connor	Greens	Madeleine Ogilvie	Labor	Scott Bacon	Labor	Matthew Groom	Liberal	Elise Archer	Liberal	5 seats (1998–2024)			
2018	Cassy O'Connor	Greens	Ella Haddad	Labor	Scott Bacon	Labor	Sue Hickey	Liberal	Elise Archer	Liberal	5 seats (1998–2024)			
2019	Cassy O'Connor	Greens	Ella Haddad	Labor	Madeleine Ogilvie	Independent	Sue Hickey	Liberal	Elise Archer	Liberal	5 seats (1998–2024)			
2021	Cassy O'Connor	Greens	Ella Haddad	Labor	Madeleine Ogilvie	Liberal	Sue Hickey	Independent	Elise Archer	Liberal	5 seats (1998–2024)			
2021	Cassy O'Connor	Greens	Ella Haddad	Labor	Madeleine Ogilvie	Liberal	Kristie Johnston	Independent	Elise Archer	Liberal	5 seats (1998–2024)			
2023a	Vica Bayley	Greens	Ella Haddad	Labor	Madeleine Ogilvie	Liberal	Kristie Johnston	Independent	Elise Archer	Independent	5 seats (1998–2024)			
2023b	Vica Bayley	Greens	Ella Haddad	Labor	Madeleine Ogilvie	Liberal	Kristie Johnston	Independent	Simon Behrakis	Liberal	5 seats (1998–2024)			
2024	Vica Bayley	Greens	Ella Haddad	Labor	Madeleine Ogilvie	Liberal	Kristie Johnston	Independent	Simon Behrakis	Liberal	Josh Willie	Labor	Helen Burnet	Greens
2025	Vica Bayley	Greens	Ella Haddad	Labor	Madeleine Ogilvie	Liberal	Kristie Johnston	Independent	Marcus Vermey	Liberal	Josh Willie	Labor	Helen Burnet	Greens
2026	Vica Bayley	Greens	Ella Haddad	Labor	Madeleine Ogilvie	Liberal	Kristie Johnston	Independent	Marcus Vermey	Liberal	Josh Willie	Labor	Helen Burnet	Independent

== Election results ==

2025 Tasmanian state election: Clark
Party	Candidate	Votes	%	±%
Quota		8,006		
Liberal	Marcus Vermey (elected 6)	5,870	9.2	+3.7
Liberal	Simon Behrakis	5,122	8.0	−0.1
Liberal	Madeleine Ogilvie (elected 7)	4,452	7.0	−0.3
Liberal	Marilena di Florio	1,372	2.1	+2.1
Liberal	Jessica Barnett	1,154	1.8	+1.8
Liberal	Edwin Johnstone	1,007	1.6	+1.6
Liberal	David Wan	647	1.0	+1.0
Labor	Ella Haddad (elected 3)	5,627	8.8	−2.1
Labor	Josh Willie (elected 4)	5,552	8.7	−0.2
Labor	Luke Martin	1,997	3.1	+3.1
Labor	John Kamara	1,826	2.9	+0.2
Labor	Tessa McLaughlin	898	1.4	+1.4
Labor	Liam McLaren	793	1.2	+1.2
Labor	Craig Shirley	605	0.9	+0.9
Greens	Vica Bayley (elected 2)	5,793	9.0	−0.9
Greens	Helen Burnet (elected 5)	4,469	7.0	+1.6
Greens	Janet Shelley	1,250	2.0	+0.3
Greens	Peter Jones	898	1.4	+0.1
Greens	Nathan Volf	657	1.0	0.0
Greens	Angus Templeton	542	0.9	+0.9
Greens	Pat Caruana	518	0.8	+0.8
Independent	Kristie Johnston (elected 1)	9,629	15.0	+7.3
Independent	Elise Archer	2,141	3.3	+3.3
Independent	Steven Phipps	564	0.9	+0.9
Independent	Jags Goldsmith	359	0.6	+0.6
Independent	John MacGowan	300	0.5	+0.5
Total formal votes		64,042	95.4	+0.8
Informal votes		3,115	4.6	−0.8
Turnout		67,157	90.3	−0.3
Party total votes
Liberal		19,624	30.6	+3.5
Labor		17,298	27.0	−3.5
Greens		14,127	22.0	+1.1
Independent	Kristie Johnston	9,629	15.0	+7.3
Independent	Elise Archer	2,141	3.3	+3.3
Independent	Steven Phipps	564	0.9	+0.9
Independent	Jags Goldsmith	359	0.6	+0.6
Independent	John MacGowan	300	0.5	+0.5

== See also ==
- Tasmanian Legislative Council
