= Terry Martin (Australian politician) =

Australian politician (born 1957)

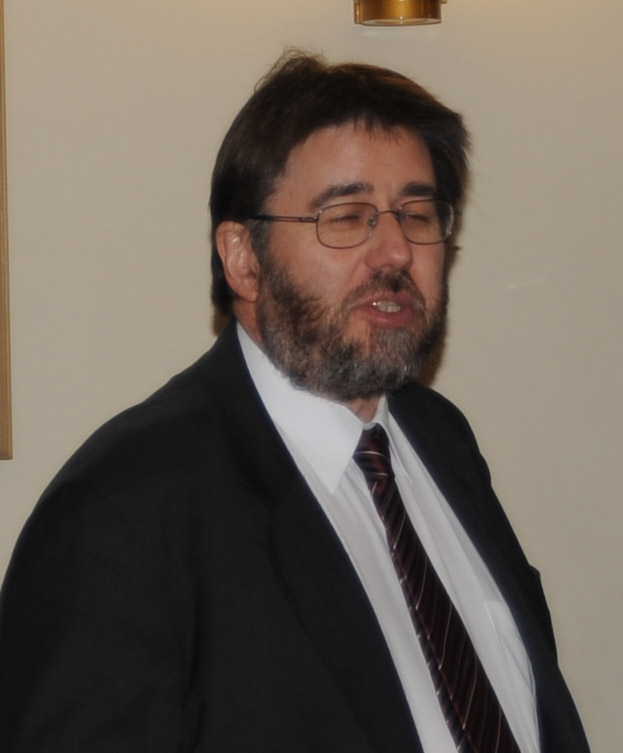
- Martin in 2008

Member of the Tasmanian Legislative Council for Elwick
- In office 2 May 2004 – 30 April 2010
- Preceded by: David Crean
- Succeeded by: Adriana Taylor

Personal details
- Born: Terence Lewis Martin; 4 November 1957 (age 69) Hobart, Tasmania
- Party: Independent
- Other political affiliations: Labor

Terence Lewis "Terry" Martin (born 4 November 1957, Hobart) is a former independent member of the Tasmanian Legislative Council in the Electoral division of Elwick. In 2011 he was convicted of creating child exploitation material and raping a 12-year-old girl.

== Political career ==
Martin was first elected in May 2004 as a member of the Labor Party but was expelled from the parliamentary Labor party after crossing the floor to vote against a bill concerning a pulp mill. He then sat as an independent.

Prior to entering parliament, he served as mayor of Glenorchy since 1990. Even after he was elected to parliament he remained in this role until after local government elections in October 2005.

On 30 October 2009, Martin appeared in the Hobart Magistrates Court charged with having sex with a 12-year-old girl. He pleaded not guilty.

Martin did not nominate for re-election in 2010 and his term expired on 30 April 2010.

On 21 November 2011 he was convicted of creating child pornography and having sex with a 12-year-old girl. On 29 November 2011 he was handed a wholly suspended sentence, with the judge finding that the medication Martin was taking for Parkinson's disease had been a significant factor in his actions, and stating that there was "no likelihood" that Martin would reoffend. The judge said that Martin's offence was directly related to medication for Parkinson's Disease which caused hypersexual desire, leading Martin to seek out 162 sex workers, one of whom was the 12-year-old, who was prostituted by her mother and a pimp. Martin was one of 100 men who had sex with the 12-year-old girl in September 2009. Martin said he thought the girl was 18.

== Personal life ==
Martin is the son of former Tasmanian MHA Terry Martin Sr.

== See also ==
- Child sexual abuse in Australia

Tasmanian Legislative Council
Preceded by David Crean	Member for Elwick; 2004–2010	Succeeded by Adriana Taylor
Civic offices
Preceded by David Shields	Mayor of Glenorchy; 1990–2005	Succeeded by Adriana Taylor
