= Adriana Taylor =

Australian politician

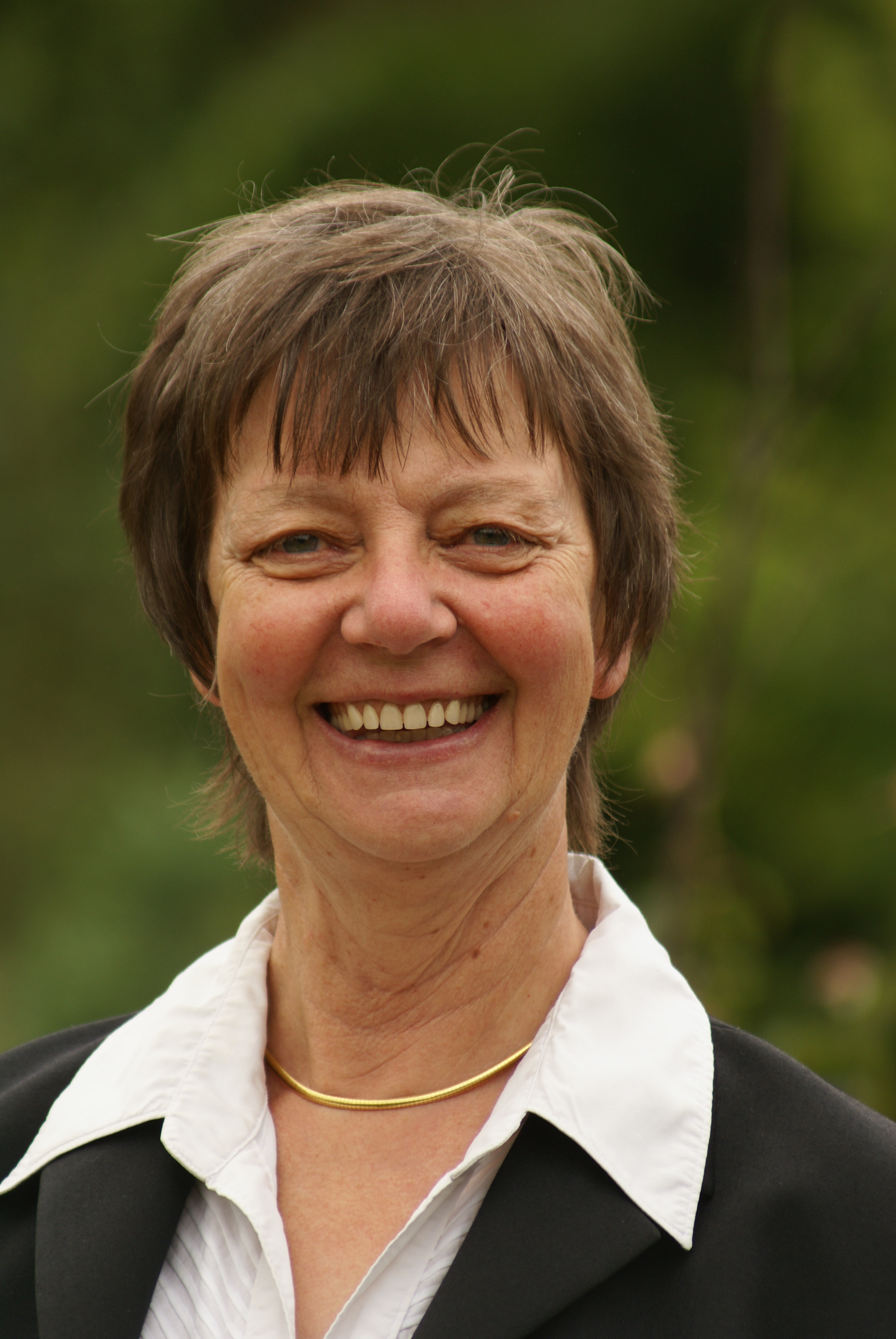

Member of the Tasmanian Legislative Council for Elwick
- In office 1 May 2010 – 7 May 2016
- Preceded by: Terry Martin
- Succeeded by: Josh Willie

Commissioner of the Huon Valley
- In office 10 October 2016 – 30 October 2018
- Appointed by: Peter Gutwein

Personal details
- Born: 20 August 1946 (age 80) Tilburg, Netherlands
- Citizenship: Australian
- Party: Independent
- Spouse: Beres Taylor (m. 1968)
- Education: University of New England
- Occupation: Teacher
- Website: www.adrianataylor.com

Adriana Johanna Taylor (born 20 August 1946) is an Australian politician. She was an Independent member of the Tasmanian Legislative Council for Elwick from 2010 to 2016.

She was born in Tilburg in the Netherlands, and migrated with her family to Australia in 1956.

Taylor, a short-term Labor Party member and former mayor of Glenorchy from 2005 to 2011, ran as an independent for the seat of Elwick in 2010, which was being vacated by Labor-turned-independent MLC Terry Martin following charges of child sexual abuse. She easily defeated her Labor opponent with 49% of the vote.

She was defeated by Labor candidate Josh Willie at the 2016 periodic elections.

She was appointed Commissioner for Huon Valley Council in October 2016 following the dismissal of the municipal council by the State Government.

Tasmanian Legislative Council
Preceded by Terry Martin	Member for Elwick; 2010–2016	Succeeded by Josh Willie
