= Results of the 1937 Tasmanian state election =

Tasmanian state election, 20 February 1937 House of Assembly << 1934–1941 >>
Enrolled voters	132,001				
Votes cast	124,460		Turnout	94.29%	–0.18%
Informal votes	2,997		Informal	2.41%	–0.79%
Summary of votes by party
Party	Primary votes	%	Swing	Seats	Change
Labor	71,263	58.67%	+12.89%	18	+ 4
Nationalist	47,204	38.86%	–7.86%	12	– 1
Independent	2,996	2.47%	–5.04%	0	– 3
Total	121,463			30	

This is a list of House of Assembly results for the 1937 Tasmanian election.

== Results by division ==
=== Bass ===
1937 Tasmanian state election: Bass
Party	Candidate	Votes	%	±%
Quota		3,418		
Labor	Thomas Davies (elected 1)	7,344	30.7	+9.4
Labor	John Madden (elected 2)	2,426	10.1	+5.5
Labor	John McDonald (elected 4)	2,174	9.1	+3.6
Labor	Eric Howroyd (elected 5)	1,410	5.9	+5.9
Labor	George McElwee	1,080	4.5	+4.5
Labor	Peter Pike	671	2.8	+2.8
Nationalist	John Ockerby (elected 3)	2,836	11.9	+4.7
Nationalist	Angus McKenzie	1,639	6.9	+6.9
Nationalist	Allen Hollingsworth (elected 6)	1,501	6.3	−7.1
Nationalist	Syd Jackson	1,340	5.6	−0.2
Nationalist	Harold Solomon	888	3.7	+3.7
Independent	Percy Harvey	529	2.2	+2.2
Independent	John Sheehan	82	0.3	+0.3
Total formal votes		23,920	97.7	+1.1
Informal votes		570	2.3	−1.1
Turnout		24,490	93.8	−0.8
Party total votes
Labor		15,105	63.1	+12.3
Nationalist		8,204	34.3	−14.9
Independent	Percy Harvey	529	2.2	+2.2
Independent	John Sheehan	82	0.3	+0.3

=== Darwin ===
1937 Tasmanian state election: Darwin
Party	Candidate	Votes	%	±%
Quota		3,527		
Labor	Thomas d'Alton (elected 1)	7,576	30.7	+15.7
Labor	Philip Kelly (elected 2)	2,086	8.5	−2.6
Labor	Joseph McGrath (elected 3)	1,659	6.7	+0.9
Labor	Bill Aylett	1,317	5.3	+5.3
Labor	Henry Lane	830	3.4	−0.6
Labor	Garnet Cooper	711	2.9	+2.9
Nationalist	Frank Edwards (elected 5)	2,030	8.2	+1.3
Nationalist	Jack Chamberlain (elected 4)	1,994	8.1	+1.5
Nationalist	Frank Marriott (elected 6)	1,929	7.8	−0.1
Nationalist	John Wright	1,827	7.4	+1.1
Nationalist	Henry McFie	1,482	6.0	+0.7
Nationalist	Stephen Broad	798	3.2	+3.2
Nationalist	Hubert Nichols	317	1.3	+1.3
Independent	James Campbell	128	0.5	+0.5
Total formal votes		24,684	97.1	+0.1
Informal votes		725	2.9	−0.1
Turnout		25,409	94.1	+0.1
Party total votes
Labor		14,179	57.4	+16.6
Nationalist		10,377	42.0	−10.8
Independent	James Campbell	128	0.5	+0.5

=== Denison ===
1937 Tasmanian state election: Denison
Party	Candidate	Votes	%	±%
Quota		3,469		
Labor	Edmund Dwyer-Gray (elected 1)	4,614	19.0	+11.8
Labor	Robert Cosgrove (elected 2)	4,314	17.8	+1.9
Labor	Charles Culley (elected 3)	2,514	10.4	−1.2
Labor	Francis Heerey (elected 4)	1,919	7.9	+7.9
Labor	Alfred White	686	2.8	+1.1
Labor	John Lattin	194	0.8	+0.8
Nationalist	John Soundy (elected 5)	2,660	11.0	−4.1
Nationalist	Arndell Lewis (elected 6)	2,466	10.2	+6.1
Nationalist	Eric Johnson	1,444	5.9	−0.8
Nationalist	Ernest Turner	1,316	5.4	−0.8
Nationalist	D'Arcy Addison	517	2.1	−2.2
Independent	George Carruthers	1,007	4.1	−4.6
Independent	George Collis	554	2.3	+2.3
Independent	Frederick Lambert	73	0.3	+0.3
Total formal votes		24,278	98.0	+1.1
Informal votes		496	2.0	−1.1
Turnout		24,774	94.0	−1.1
Party total votes
Labor		14,241	58.7	−10.0
Nationalist		8,403	34.6	−3.2
Independent	George Carruthers	1,007	4.1	−4.6
Independent	George Collis	554	2.3	+2.3
Independent	Frederick Lambert	73	0.3	+0.3

=== Franklin ===
1937 Tasmanian state election: Franklin
Party	Candidate	Votes	%	±%
Quota		3,685		
Labor	Albert Ogilvie (elected 1)	9,008	34.9	+9.5
Labor	Edward Brooker (elected 4)	2,571	10.0	0.0
Labor	John Dwyer (elected 3)	2,190	8.5	−1.7
Labor	Basil Plummer (elected 5)	977	3.8	+3.8
Labor	Francis McDermott	365	1.4	+1.4
Nationalist	Henry Baker (elected 2)	4,330	16.8	+4.1
Nationalist	George Doyle (elected 6)	1,838	7.1	+7.1
Nationalist	Benjamin Pearsall	1,462	5.7	+5.7
Nationalist	Vincent Shoobridge	1,105	4.3	+4.3
Nationalist	John Piggott	1,062	4.1	+4.1
Nationalist	Andrew Cooper	592	2.3	+2.3
Nationalist	Benjamin Watkins	289	1.1	−4.3
Total formal votes		25,789	97.7	+0.4
Informal votes		596	2.3	−0.4
Turnout		26,385	95.8	+0.7
Party total votes
Labor		15,111	58.6	+6.7
Nationalist		10,678	41.4	+3.6

=== Wilmot ===
1937 Tasmanian state election: Wilmot
Party	Candidate	Votes	%	±%
Quota		3,257		
Labor	Eric Ogilvie (elected 1)	6,329	27.8	−1.0
Labor	George Becker (elected 2)	2,801	12.3	+12.3
Labor	David O'Keefe (elected 3)	1,639	7.2	+7.2
Labor	Lancelot Spurr	1,206	5.3	+5.3
Labor	William Taylor	652	2.9	+2.9
Nationalist	Neil Campbell (elected 4)	2,904	12.7	+12.7
Nationalist	Walter Lee (elected 6)	2,251	9.9	+9.9
Nationalist	Francis Foster (elected 5)	2,170	9.5	+5.6
Nationalist	Donald Cameron	1,272	5.6	+5.6
Nationalist	Arthur Hutchinson	388	1.7	+1.7
Nationalist	Charles Salter	287	1.3	+1.3
Nationalist	William Ritchie	270	1.2	+1.2
Independent	William Drake	542	2.4	+2.4
Independent	Athol Smith	81	0.4	+0.4
Total formal votes		22,792	97.1	+1.0
Informal votes		677	2.9	−1.0
Turnout		23,469	93.9	+0.3
Party total votes
Labor		12,627	55.4	+19.6
Nationalist		9,542	41.9	−15.1
Independent	William Drake	542	2.4	+2.4
Independent	Athol Smith	81	0.4	+0.4

== See also ==
- 1937 Tasmanian state election
- Members of the Tasmanian House of Assembly, 1937–1941
- Candidates of the 1937 Tasmanian state election
