= Results of the 1941 Tasmanian state election =

Tasmanian state election, 13 December 1941 House of Assembly << 1937–1946 >>
Enrolled voters	139,234				
Votes cast	127,034		Turnout	91.24%	–3.05%
Informal votes	6,344		Informal	4.99%	–2.59%
Summary of votes by party
Party	Primary votes	%	Swing	Seats	Change
Labor	75,544	62.59%	+3.92%	20	+ 2
Nationalist	44,158	36.58%	–2.28%	10	– 2
Independent	996	0.83%	–1.64%	0	± 0
Total	120,690			30	

This is a list of House of Assembly results for the 1941 Tasmanian election.

== Results by division ==
=== Bass ===
1941 Tasmanian state election: Bass
Party	Candidate	Votes	%	±%
Quota		3,234		
Labor	Thomas Davies (elected 1)	6,220	27.5	−3.2
Labor	John Madden (elected 2)	2,753	12.2	+2.1
Labor	John McDonald (elected 4)	2,253	10.0	+0.9
Labor	Eric Howroyd (elected 3)	1,829	8.1	+2.2
Labor	Alan Welsh	745	3.3	+3.3
Labor	John Quintal	742	3.3	+3.3
Nationalist	John Ockerby (elected 5)	2,540	11.2	−0.7
Nationalist	Frank Marriott (elected 6)	1,737	7.7	+7.7
Nationalist	Desmond Oldham	1,556	6.9	+0.6
Nationalist	Allen Hollingsworth	1,471	6.5	+0.2
Nationalist	Ernest Pitchford	786	3.5	+3.5
Total formal votes		22,632	93.8	−3.9
Informal votes		1,487	6.2	+3.9
Turnout		24,119	91.1	−2.7
Party total votes
Labor		14,542	64.2	+1.1
Nationalist		8,090	35.7	+1.4

=== Darwin ===
1941 Tasmanian state election: Darwin
Party	Candidate	Votes	%	±%
Quota		3,616		
Labor	Thomas d'Alton (elected 1)	10,380	41.0	+10.3
Labor	James Bugg (elected 3)	1,728	6.8	+6.8
Labor	Philip Kelly (elected 2)	1,320	5.2	−3.3
Labor	Henry Lane (elected 5)	862	3.4	0.0
Labor	Michael Smith	525	2.1	+2.1
Nationalist	Jack Chamberlain (elected 4)	3,267	12.9	+4.8
Nationalist	Henry McFie (elected 6)	1,622	6.4	+0.4
Nationalist	John Wright	1,561	6.2	−1.2
Nationalist	Gerald Acheson	1,207	4.8	+4.8
Nationalist	Norman Booth	1,107	4.4	+4.4
Nationalist	Russell Green	1,062	4.2	+4.2
Nationalist	Stephen Broad	669	2.6	−0.6
Total formal votes		25,310	95.3	−2.1
Informal votes		1,250	4.7	+2.1
Turnout		26,560	90.5	−3.3
Party total votes
Labor		14,815	58.5	+1.1
Nationalist		10,495	41.5	−0.5

=== Denison ===
1941 Tasmanian state election: Denison
Party	Candidate	Votes	%	±%
Quota		3,537		
Labor	Robert Cosgrove (elected 1)	8,482	34.3	+16.5
Labor	Alfred White (elected 5)	2,778	11.2	+8.4
Labor	Charles Culley (elected 2)	2,075	8.4	−2.0
Labor	Edmund Dwyer-Gray (elected 3)	1,418	5.7	−13.3
Labor	Francis Heerey	1,285	5.2	−2.7
Labor	Sarah Kelly	725	2.9	+2.9
Nationalist	John Soundy (elected 4)	3,033	12.2	+1.2
Nationalist	Charles Atkins (elected 6)	1,407	5.7	+5.7
Nationalist	Ernest Turner	1,103	4.5	−0.9
Nationalist	Raymond Smith	838	3.4	+3.4
Nationalist	Robert Harvey	614	2.5	+2.5
Nationalist	Dugald McDougall	567	2.3	+2.3
Nationalist	Albert Kalbfell	113	0.5	+0.5
Independent	Michael O'Reilly	316	1.3	+1.3
Total formal votes		24,754	95.0	−3.0
Informal votes		1,294	5.0	+3.0
Turnout		26,048	91.2	−2.8
Party total votes
Labor		16,763	67.7	+9.0
Nationalist		7,675	31.0	−3.6
Independent	Michael O'Reilly	316	1.3	+1.3

=== Franklin ===
1941 Tasmanian state election: Franklin
Party	Candidate	Votes	%	±%
Quota		3,663		
Labor	Edward Brooker (elected 1)	6,841	26.7	+16.7
Labor	John Dwyer (elected 3)	3,398	13.3	+4.8
Labor	Thomas McKinley (elected 4)	2,434	9.5	+9.5
Labor	Basil Plummer	1,790	7.0	+3.2
Labor	Francis McDermott	1,213	4.7	+3.3
Labor	Henry Hope (elected 6)	1,038	4.0	+4.0
Nationalist	Henry Baker (elected 2)	3,782	14.8	−2.0
Nationalist	Benjamin Pearsall	1,165	4.5	−1.2
Nationalist	John McPhee (elected 5)	1,119	4.4	+4.4
Nationalist	John Piggott	620	2.4	−1.7
Nationalist	Arthur Crisp	520	2.0	+2.0
Nationalist	Vincent Shoobridge	479	1.9	−2.4
Nationalist	Albert Beards	373	1.5	+1.5
Nationalist	Leo McPartlan	188	0.7	+0.7
Independent	Thomas Kimber	680	2.7	+2.7
Total formal votes		25,640	94.6	−3.1
Informal votes		1,474	5.4	+3.1
Turnout		27,114	92.2	−3.6
Party total votes
Labor		16,714	65.2	+6.6
Nationalist		8,246	32.2	−9.2
Independent	Thomas Kimber	680	2.7	+2.7

=== Wilmot ===
1941 Tasmanian state election: Wilmot
Party	Candidate	Votes	%	±%
Quota		3,194		
Labor	Lancelot Spurr (elected 1)	4,187	18.7	+13.4
Labor	David O'Keefe (elected 3)	3,152	14.1	+6.9
Labor	William Taylor (elected 5)	2,176	9.7	+6.8
Labor	Ernest West (elected 6)	2,069	9.3	+9.3
Labor	Peter Pike	1,126	5.0	+5.0
Nationalist	Neil Campbell (elected 2)	3,708	16.6	+3.9
Nationalist	Walter Lee (elected 4)	2,295	10.3	+0.4
Nationalist	Francis Foster	1,560	7.0	−2.5
Nationalist	Milton Taylor	929	4.2	+4.2
Nationalist	Thomas Johnston	586	2.6	+2.6
Nationalist	Raymond Madden	566	2.5	+2.5
Total formal votes		22,354	96.4	−0.7
Informal votes		839	3.6	+0.7
Turnout		23,193	91.2	−2.7
Party total votes
Labor		12,710	56.9	+1.5
Nationalist		9,644	43.1	+1.2

== See also ==
- 1941 Tasmanian state election
- Members of the Tasmanian House of Assembly, 1941–1946
- Candidates of the 1941 Tasmanian state election
