= Candidates of the 1937 Tasmanian state election =

The 1937 Tasmanian state election was held on 20 February 1937.

== Retiring Members ==
=== Nationalist ===
- Sir John Evans MHA (Franklin)
- Claude James MHA (Bass)

== House of Assembly ==
Sitting members are shown in bold text. Tickets that elected at least one MHA are highlighted in the relevant colour. Successful candidates are indicated by an asterisk (*).

=== Bass ===
Six seats were up for election. The Labor Party was defending three seats. The Nationalist Party was defending three seats.

Labor candidates	Nationalist candidates	Independent candidates
**Thomas Davies***; Eric Howroyd*; **John McDonald***; George McElwee; **John Madden***; Peter Pike	**Allen Hollingsworth***; Syd Jackson; Angus McKenzie; **John Ockerby***; Harold Solomon	Percy Harvey; John Sheehan

=== Darwin ===
Six seats were up for election. The Labor Party was defending three seats. The Nationalist Party was defending three seats.

Labor candidates	Nationalist candidates	Independent candidates
Bill Aylett; Garnet Cooper; **Thomas d'Alton***; **Philip Kelly***; Henry Lane; **Joseph McGrath***	Stephen Broad; **Jack Chamberlain***; **Frank Edwards***; Henry McFie; **Frank Marriott***; Hubert Nichols; John Wright	James Campbell

=== Denison ===
Six seats were up for election. The Labor Party was defending three seats. The Nationalist Party was defending two seats. Independent MHA George Carruthers was defending one seat.

Labor candidates	Nationalist candidates	Independent candidates
**Robert Cosgrove***; **Charles Culley***; **Edmund Dwyer-Gray***; Francis Heerey*; John Lattin; Alfred White	D'Arcy Addison; Eric Johnson; Arndell Lewis*; **John Soundy***; **Ernest Turner**	**George Carruthers**; George Collis; Frederick Lambert

=== Franklin ===
Six seats were up for election. The Labor Party was defending three seats. The Nationalist Party was defending two seats, although independent MHA Benjamin Pearsall had joined the Nationalists and was running on their ticket.

Labor candidates	Nationalist candidates
**Edward Brooker***; **John Dwyer***; Francis McDermott; **Albert Ogilvie***; Basil Plummer*	**Henry Baker***; Andrew Cooper; George Doyle*; **Benjamin Pearsall**; John Piggott; Vincent Shoobridge; Benjamin Watkins

=== Wilmot ===
Six seats were up for election. The Labor Party was defending two seats, although independent MHA George Becker had joined the Labor Party and was running on their ticket. The Nationalist Party was defending three seats.

Labor candidates	Nationalist candidates	Independent candidates
**George Becker***; **Eric Ogilvie***; **David O'Keefe***; Lancelot Spurr; William Taylor	**Donald Cameron**; **Neil Campbell***; Francis Foster*; Arthur Hutchinson; **Sir Walter Lee***; William Ritchie; Charles Salter	William Drake; Athol Smith

== See also ==
- Members of the Tasmanian House of Assembly, 1934–1937
- Members of the Tasmanian House of Assembly, 1937–1941
