= Results of the 1934 Tasmanian state election =

Tasmanian state election, 9 June 1934 House of Assembly << 1931–1937 >>
Enrolled voters	127,681				
Votes cast	120,622		Turnout	94.47%	–0.52%
Informal votes	3,885		Informal	3.20%	–0.25%
Summary of votes by party
Party	Primary votes	%	Swing	Seats	Change
Nationalist	54,549	46.72%	–9.68%	13	– 6
Labor	53,454	45.78%	+10.85%	14	+ 4
Independent	8,764	7.51%	–1.17%	3	+ 2
Total	116,767			30	

This is a list of House of Assembly results for the 1934 Tasmanian election.

== Results by division ==
=== Bass ===
1934 Tasmanian state election: Bass
Party	Candidate	Votes	%	±%
Quota		3,335		
Labor	Thomas Davies (elected 1)	4,982	21.3	+10.5
Labor	Victor Shaw (elected 2)	2,867	12.3	−1.8
Labor	John Joseph McDonald (elected 6)	1,313	5.6	+5.6
Labor	Charles Lamp	1,270	5.4	+5.4
Labor	Frederick Hall	355	1.5	+1.5
Nationalist	Allen Hollingsworth (elected 3)	3,138	13.4	+13.4
Nationalist	Claude James (elected 4)	2,217	9.5	−0.4
Nationalist	Robert Murphy	1,812	7.8	−6.0
Nationalist	John Ockerby (elected 5)	1,671	7.2	−0.6
Nationalist	Syd Jackson	1,346	5.8	+5.8
Nationalist	Herbert Postle	825	3.5	−1.8
Nationalist	Henry Thomson	650	2.8	−3.2
Nationalist	Robert Wright	324	1.4	+1.4
Total formal votes		23,339	96.6	0.0
Informal votes		831	3.4	0.0
Turnout		24,170	94.6	−0.1
Party total votes
Labor		11,856	50.8	+13.6
Nationalist		11,483	49.2	−13.6

=== Darwin ===
1934 Tasmanian state election: Darwin
Party	Candidate	Votes	%	±%
Quota		3,403		
Nationalist	Frank Marriott (elected 3)	1,878	7.9	−4.4
Nationalist	Frank Edwards (elected 5)	1,648	6.9	+6.9
Nationalist	Jack Chamberlain (elected 4)	1,564	6.6	+6.6
Nationalist	John Wright	1,491	6.3	+1.1
Nationalist	Henry McFie	1,259	5.3	−3.3
Nationalist	Thomas Butler	1,008	4.2	−21.5
Nationalist	John Astell	865	3.6	+3.6
Nationalist	Robert Hamilton	851	3.6	+3.6
Nationalist	Ernest Fenton	769	3.2	+3.2
Nationalist	Cyril Horne	767	3.2	+3.2
Nationalist	Edward Hobbs	478	2.0	−5.3
Labor	Thomas d'Alton (elected 1)	3,561	15.0	+3.3
Labor	Philip Kelly (elected 2)	2,649	11.1	+1.5
Labor	Joseph McGrath (elected 6)	1,382	5.8	+4.1
Labor	James Belton	1,181	5.0	−1.7
Labor	Henry Lane	956	4.0	+4.0
Independent	Stephen Broad	1,512	6.3	+6.3
Total formal votes		23,819	97.0	+0.3
Informal votes		725	3.0	−0.3
Turnout		24,544	94.0	−1.2
Party total votes
Nationalist		12,578	52.8	−7.2
Labor		9,729	40.8	+9.4
Independent	Stephen Broad	1,512	6.3	+6.3

=== Denison ===
1934 Tasmanian state election: Denison
Party	Candidate	Votes	%	±%
Quota		3,292		
Labor	Robert Cosgrove (elected 1)	3,661	15.9	+9.4
Labor	Charles Culley (elected 3)	2,665	11.6	+11.6
Labor	Edmund Dwyer-Gray (elected 4)	1,662	7.2	+0.4
Labor	Gerald Mahoney	1,661	7.2	−4.1
Labor	Walter Woods	770	3.3	−0.9
Labor	Edgar Geer	422	1.8	+1.8
Labor	Alfred White	381	1.7	+1.7
Nationalist	John Soundy (elected 2)	3,489	15.1	+10.4
Nationalist	Eric Johnson	1,534	6.7	+6.7
Nationalist	Ernest Turner (elected 5)	1,419	6.2	−4.1
Nationalist	D'Arcy Addison	1,001	4.3	+4.3
Nationalist	Arndell Lewis	937	4.1	+0.6
Nationalist	Trevor Young	328	1.4	+1.4
Social Credit	George Carruthers (elected 6)	1,995	8.7	+8.7
Independent	William Jarvis	491	2.1	+2.1
Independent Labor	Thomas Jude	320	1.4	+1.4
Independent	Lesley Murdoch	192	0.8	+0.8
Independent	Robert Leitch	111	0.5	+0.5
Total formal votes		23,039	96.9	+0.3
Informal votes		736	3.1	−0.3
Turnout		23,775	95.1	−0.2
Party total votes
Labor		11,222	48.7	+8.4
Nationalist		8,708	37.8	−15.9
Social Credit	George Carruthers	1,995	8.7	+8.7
Independent	William Jarvis	491	2.1	+2.1
Independent Labor	Thomas Jude	320	1.4	+1.4
Independent	Lesley Murdoch	192	0.8	+0.8
Independent	Robert Leitch	111	0.5	+0.5

=== Franklin ===
1934 Tasmanian state election: Franklin
Party	Candidate	Votes	%	±%
Quota		3,535		
Labor	Albert Ogilvie (elected 1)	6,295	25.4	+9.5
Labor	John Dwyer (elected 2)	2,528	10.2	+3.4
Labor	Edward Brooker (elected 6)	2,481	10.0	−7.3
Labor	Charles Frost	1,538	6.2	+6.2
Nationalist	Henry Baker (elected 3)	3,135	12.7	−7.7
Nationalist	Alfred Seabrook	1,709	6.9	−0.3
Nationalist	John Evans (elected 4)	1,614	6.5	−0.6
Nationalist	Benjamin Watkins	1,326	5.4	+5.4
Nationalist	George Harvey	902	3.6	+3.6
Nationalist	Albert Beard	658	2.7	+2.7
Independent	Benjamin Pearsall (elected 5)	1,790	7.2	0.0
Independent	Peter Murdoch	768	3.1	−2.0
Total formal votes		24,744	97.3	+0.4
Informal votes		688	2.7	−0.4
Turnout		25,432	95.1	−0.4
Party total votes
Labor		12,842	51.9	+20.1
Nationalist		9,344	37.8	−6.1
Independent	Benjamin Pearsall	1,790	7.2	0.0
Independent	Peter Murdoch	768	3.1	−2.0

=== Wilmot ===
1934 Tasmanian state election: Wilmot
Party	Candidate	Votes	%	±%
Quota		3,119		
Nationalist	Walter Lee (elected 2)	3,112	14.3	+2.0
Nationalist	Neil Campbell (elected 3)	2,550	11.7	−6.1
Nationalist	Donald Cameron (elected 5)	1,239	5.7	+5.7
Nationalist	Percy Best	1,180	5.4	−3.1
Nationalist	Harold Lord	1,070	4.9	+4.9
Nationalist	Llewellyn Atkinson	862	3.9	−8.2
Nationalist	Francis Foster	844	3.9	+3.9
Nationalist	Alfred Burbury	720	3.3	−8.2
Nationalist	Henry Wilson	449	2.1	+2.1
Nationalist	Peter Sattler	410	1.9	+1.9
Labor	Eric Ogilvie (elected 1)	3,708	17.0	+6.1
Labor	David O'Keefe (elected 4)	1,631	7.5	+7.5
Labor	Lancelot Spurr	1,272	5.8	+5.8
Labor	Francis Cosgrove	1,033	4.7	+4.7
Labor	Charles Metz	161	0.7	+0.7
Independent Labor	George Becker (elected 6)	1,585	7.3	+7.3
Total formal votes		21,826	96.1	+0.2
Informal votes		875	3.9	−0.2
Turnout		22,701	93.6	−0.6
Party total votes
Nationalist		12,436	57.0	−5.1
Labor		7,805	35.8	+1.6
Independent Labor	George Becker	1,585	7.3	+7.3

== See also ==
- 1934 Tasmanian state election
- Members of the Tasmanian House of Assembly, 1934–1937
- Candidates of the 1934 Tasmanian state election
