= Electoral results for the Division of Clark (state, 1913-1969) =

This is a list of electoral results for the division of Clark and Denison in Tasmanian elections from 1913 through 1969

== Election results ==
=== Elections in the 1960s ===
==== 1969 ====
1969 Tasmanian state election: Denison
Party	Candidate	Votes	%	±%
Quota		4,921		
Liberal	Nigel Abbott (elected 1)	5,144	13.1	+6.7
Liberal	Robert Mather (elected 3)	3,084	7.8	+2.6
Liberal	Max Bingham (elected 4)	2,999	7.6	+7.6
Liberal	Ronald Banks	2,182	5.5	+5.5
Liberal	Bob Baker (elected 5)	1,622	4.1	+4.1
Liberal	George Brown	1,524	3.9	+0.9
Liberal	Horace Strutt	1,086	2.8	+1.1
Liberal	John Hand	1,035	2.6	+2.6
Labor	Merv Everett (elected 2)	5,073	12.9	+2.5
Labor	Ken Austin (elected 6)	3,213	8.2	+3.3
Labor	Neil Batt (elected 7)	2,978	7.6	+7.6
Labor	Harry McLoughlin	2,692	6.8	−5.8
Labor	Reginald Richardson	971	2.5	+2.5
Labor	Albert Schluter	889	2.3	+2.3
Labor	Malcolm Hills	739	1.9	+1.9
Labor	Donald Finlay	643	1.6	+1.6
Independent	Bill Wedd	2,395	6.1	+2.7
Democratic Labor	Michael Delaney	685	1.7	+1.7
Democratic Labor	Leslie Foley	160	0.4	+0.4
Centre	Jim Campbell	142	0.4	+0.4
Centre	James Rimmer	106	0.3	+0.3
Total formal votes		39,362	95.0	−0.5
Informal votes		2,055	5.0	+0.5
Turnout		41,417	92.9	−1.1
Party total votes
Liberal		18,676	47.4	+2.5
Labor		17,198	43.7	−0.3
Independent	Bill Wedd	2,395	6.1	+2.7
Democratic Labor		845	2.1	+2.1
Centre		248	0.6	+0.6

==== 1964 ====
1964 Tasmanian state election: Denison
Party	Candidate	Votes	%	±%
Quota		4,151		
Liberal	Rex Townley (elected 1)	8,903	26.8	+1.7
Liberal	Nigel Abbott (elected 3)	2,117	6.4	+6.4
Liberal	Robert Mather (elected 5)	1,742	5.2	+5.2
Liberal	George Brown	981	3.0	+3.0
Liberal	Horace Strutt (elected 6)	578	1.7	−0.3
Liberal	Donald Clark	308	0.9	−2.1
Liberal	Gladys Schott	281	0.8	+0.8
Labor	Harry McLoughlin (elected 2)	4,200	12.6	+4.8
Labor	Merv Everett (elected 4)	3,453	10.4	+10.4
Labor	Ken Austin (elected 7)	1,632	4.9	+4.9
Labor	Neville Lovell	1,397	4.2	+4.2
Labor	Mary Cumming	1,356	4.1	−0.8
Labor	Myron Tripp	1,209	3.6	+3.6
Labor	Eric Howroyd	696	2.1	−0.7
Labor	Henry Hope	680	2.0	+2.0
Group A	Bill Wedd	1,140	3.4	−6.0
Group A	John Clemente	653	2.0	+2.0
Independent	Harold Senior	1,086	3.3	+3.3
Independent	Bill Hodgman	475	1.4	+1.4
Independent	Stanislaus Ryan	125	0.4	+0.4
Independent	Charley Aylett	102	0.3	+0.3
Communist	Max Bound	92	0.3	−0.1
Total formal votes		33,206	95.5	+1.9
Informal votes		1,579	4.5	−1.9
Turnout		34,785	94.0	−0.5
Party total votes
Liberal		14,910	44.9	+5.1
Labor		14,623	44.0	+4.5
Group A		1,793	5.4	−4.0
Independent	Harold Senior	1,086	3.3	+3.3
Independent	Bill Hodgman	475	1.4	+1.4
Independent	Stanislaus Ryan	125	0.4	+0.4
Independent	Charley Aylett	102	0.3	+0.3
Communist		92	0.3	−0.1

=== Elections in the 1950s ===
==== 1959 ====
1959 Tasmanian state election: Denison
Party	Candidate	Votes	%	±%
Quota		4,106		
Liberal	Rex Townley (elected 1)	8,251	25.1	−3.9
Liberal	Archibald Park (elected 7)	1,332	4.1	+4.1
Liberal	Bill Hodgman (elected 6)	1,064	3.2	−0.8
Liberal	Donald Clark	996	3.0	+3.0
Liberal	Harold Solomon	765	2.3	+2.3
Liberal	Horace Strutt	650	2.0	−1.2
Labor	Frank Gaha (elected 3)	3,033	9.2	+5.5
Labor	Harry McLoughlin (elected 4)	2,575	7.8	+7.8
Labor	Charley Aylett (elected 5)	2,451	7.5	+7.5
Labor	Mary Cumming	1,608	4.9	+4.9
Labor	Bert Lacey	1,430	4.4	+2.6
Labor	William Wilkinson	961	2.9	+2.9
Labor	Eric Howroyd	912	2.8	+1.6
Independent	Bill Wedd (elected 2)	3,075	9.4	+3.9
Democratic Labor	Harold Senior	1,133	3.4	+3.4
Democratic Labor	Brian Bresnehan	725	2.2	+2.2
Democratic Labor	Rex McShane	380	1.2	+1.2
Independent	Nigel Abbott	1,356	4.1	+4.1
Communist	Max Bound	126	0.4	+0.4
Communist	George Chenery	18	0.1	+0.1
Total formal votes		32,841	93.6	−2.3
Informal votes		2,241	6.4	+2.3
Turnout		35,082	94.5	−0.6
Party total votes
Liberal		13,058	39.8	−1.6
Labor		12,970	39.5	−9.2
Independent	Bill Wedd	3,075	9.4	+3.9
Democratic Labor		2,238	6.8	+4.2
Independent	Nigel Abbott	1,356	4.1	+4.1
Communist		144	0.4	+0.4

==== 1956 ====
1956 Tasmanian state election: Denison
Party	Candidate	Votes	%	±%
Quota		4,938		
Labor	Robert Cosgrove (elected 1)	10,050	29.1	+4.7
Labor	Alfred White (elected 6)	2,444	7.1	−1.9
Labor	Brian Miller	2,029	5.9	+5.9
Labor	Frank Gaha (elected 3)	1,277	3.7	−0.8
Labor	Bert Lacey	623	1.8	+1.8
Labor	Eric Howroyd	414	1.2	+1.2
Liberal	Rex Townley (elected 2)	10,030	29.0	−2.3
Liberal	Bill Hodgman (elected 5)	1,391	4.0	0.0
Liberal	Gordon Cashmore	1,239	3.6	+3.6
Liberal	Horace Strutt (elected 4)	1,094	3.2	+1.4
Liberal	Alfred Robertson	362	1.0	+1.0
Liberal	William Stanton	201	0.6	−0.1
Group D	Bill Wedd	1,896	5.5	−1.2
Group D	Terry Bower	460	1.3	+1.3
Labor (A-C)	Jack Bartholomew	418	1.2	+1.2
Labor (A-C)	Anthony Orpwood	414	1.2	+1.2
Labor (A-C)	Cyril Marshall	68	0.2	+0.2
Communist	Max Bound	91	0.3	+0.3
Independent	William Lloyd	59	0.2	+0.2
Total formal votes		34,560	95.9	−0.3
Informal votes		1,496	4.1	+0.3
Turnout		36,056	95.1	+2.7
Party total votes
Labor		16,837	48.7	−2.1
Liberal		14,317	41.4	−1.1
Group D		2,356	6.8	+0.1
Labor (A-C)		900	2.6	+2.6
Communist		91	0.3	+0.3
Independent	William Lloyd	59	0.2	+0.2

==== 1955 ====
1955 Tasmanian state election: Denison
Party	Candidate	Votes	%	±%
Quota		3,633		
Labor	Robert Cosgrove (elected 2)	6,194	24.4	+1.5
Labor	Alfred White (elected 3)	2,287	9.0	−0.5
Labor	Terence Bower	1,920	7.6	+7.6
Labor	Frank Gaha (elected 6)	1,146	4.5	−4.6
Labor	Ross Maher	858	3.4	+3.4
Labor	William Hannon	509	2.0	+2.0
Liberal	Rex Townley (elected 1)	7,961	31.3	−5.1
Liberal	Bill Hodgman (elected 5)	1,021	4.0	+4.0
Liberal	Harold Solomon	687	2.7	+2.7
Liberal	Thomas Lipscombe	514	2.0	+2.0
Liberal	Horace Strutt (elected 4)	447	1.8	+0.4
Liberal	William Stanton	181	0.7	+0.7
Independent	Bill Wedd	1,699	6.7	−2.1
Total formal votes		25,424	96.2	+2.5
Informal votes		1,008	3.8	−2.5
Turnout		26,432	92.4	−0.9
Party total votes
Labor		12,914	50.8	+4.6
Liberal		10,811	42.5	−1.6
Independent	Bill Wedd	1,699	6.7	−2.1

==== 1950 ====
1950 Tasmanian state election: Denison
Party	Candidate	Votes	%	±%
Quota		3,978		
Labor	Robert Cosgrove (elected 2)	6,382	22.9	+2.5
Labor	Alfred White (elected 4)	2,646	9.5	−1.7
Labor	Frank Gaha (elected 3)	2,535	9.1	+9.1
Labor	Henry Hope	558	2.0	−1.8
Labor	William Morgan	393	1.4	+1.4
Labor	Lloyd Neville	357	1.3	+1.3
Liberal	Rex Townley (elected 1)	10,130	36.4	+36.4
Liberal	Campbell Duncan	557	2.0	−3.1
Liberal	Arthur Hay	524	1.9	+1.9
Liberal	John Driscoll	435	1.6	+1.6
Liberal	Horace Strutt (elected 5)	380	1.4	−4.0
Liberal	Roy Cazaly	256	0.9	+0.9
Independent	Bill Wedd (elected 6)	2,437	8.8	−1.4
Independent	Leo McPartlan	166	0.6	+0.6
Communist	Max Bound	86	0.3	+0.3
Total formal votes		27,842	93.7	−1.8
Informal votes		1,857	6.3	+1.8
Turnout		29,699	93.3	+3.2
Party total votes
Labor		12,871	46.2	+1.7
Liberal		12,282	44.1	+23.2
Independent		2,603	9.3	−2.8
Communist		86	0.3	+0.3

=== Elections in the 1940s ===
==== 1948 ====
1948 Tasmanian state election: Denison
Party	Candidate	Votes	%	±%
Quota		3,960		
Labor	Robert Cosgrove (elected 1)	5,642	20.4	+3.6
Labor	Alfred White (elected 3)	3,106	11.2	+3.0
Labor	John Nolan	1,119	4.0	+0.5
Labor	Henry Hope (elected 5)	1,046	3.8	+3.8
Labor	Albert Bowring	518	1.9	+1.9
Labor	Timothy Mahoney	494	1.8	+1.8
Labor	Norman Cooper	419	1.5	+1.5
Liberal	Horace Strutt (elected 6)	1,484	5.4	+1.1
Liberal	Campbell Duncan	1,409	5.1	+5.1
Liberal	John Kennedy	984	3.6	+3.6
Liberal	Wilfred Osborne	552	2.0	+2.0
Liberal	Joyce Heathorn	457	1.6	−1.1
Liberal	Robert Harvey	391	1.4	−0.8
Liberal	Hubert Lewis	309	1.1	+1.1
Liberal	Gerald Lyons	201	0.7	+0.7
Group C	Rex Townley (elected 2)	5,535	20.0	−12.0
Group C	Edgar Lee	228	0.8	+0.8
Group A	Bill Wedd (elected 4)	2,820	10.2	+10.2
Group A	Victor Ratten	484	1.7	+1.7
Group A	Cyril Hosan	61	0.2	+0.2
Independent	Thomas Layton	282	1.0	+1.0
Independent	George Wallis	175	0.6	+0.6
Total formal votes		27,716	95.5	+6.5
Informal votes		1,304	4.5	−6.5
Turnout		29,020	90.1	+0.1
Party total votes
Labor		12,344	44.5	−0.8
Liberal		5,787	20.9	+1.5
Group C		5,763	20.8	−11.2
Group A		3,365	12.1	+12.1
Independent	Thomas Layton	282	1.0	+1.0
Independent	George Wallis	175	0.6	+0.6

==== 1946 ====
1946 Tasmanian state election: Denison
Party	Candidate	Votes	%	±%
Quota		3,684		
Labor	Robert Cosgrove (elected 2)	4,337	16.8	−17.5
Labor	Alfred White (elected 5)	2,113	8.2	−3.0
Labor	Arthur Tyler	1,591	6.2	+6.2
Labor	Charles Culley (elected 6)	937	3.6	−4.8
Labor	John Nolan	896	3.5	+3.5
Labor	Francis Heerey	835	3.2	−2.0
Labor	Maxwell Hickman	492	1.9	+1.9
Labor	Sarah Kelly	466	1.8	−1.1
Independent	Rex Townley (elected 1)	8,247	32.0	+32.0
Liberal	Horace Strutt (elected 3)	1,191	4.6	+4.6
Liberal	Charles Atkins (elected 4)	1,165	4.5	−1.2
Liberal	Arthur Hay	870	3.4	+3.4
Liberal	Joyce Heathorn	701	2.7	+2.7
Liberal	Robert Harvey	580	2.2	−0.3
Liberal	William Morrison	483	1.9	+1.9
Group Independent	Leo McPartlan	456	1.8	+1.8
Group Independent	Percival Partington	224	0.9	+0.9
Independent	William Gittus	198	0.8	+0.8
Total formal votes		25,782	89.0	−6.0
Informal votes		3,191	11.0	+6.0
Turnout		28,973	90.0	−1.2
Party total votes
Labor		11,667	45.3	−22.4
Independent	Rex Townley	8,247	32.0	+32.0
Liberal		4,990	19.4	−11.6
Group Independent		680	2.6	+2.6
Independent	William Gittus	198	0.8	+0.8

==== 1941 ====
1941 Tasmanian state election: Denison
Party	Candidate	Votes	%	±%
Quota		3,537		
Labor	Robert Cosgrove (elected 1)	8,482	34.3	+16.5
Labor	Alfred White (elected 5)	2,778	11.2	+8.4
Labor	Charles Culley (elected 2)	2,075	8.4	−2.0
Labor	Edmund Dwyer-Gray (elected 3)	1,418	5.7	−13.3
Labor	Francis Heerey	1,285	5.2	−2.7
Labor	Sarah Kelly	725	2.9	+2.9
Nationalist	John Soundy (elected 4)	3,033	12.2	+1.2
Nationalist	Charles Atkins (elected 6)	1,407	5.7	+5.7
Nationalist	Ernest Turner	1,103	4.5	−0.9
Nationalist	Raymond Smith	838	3.4	+3.4
Nationalist	Robert Harvey	614	2.5	+2.5
Nationalist	Dugald McDougall	567	2.3	+2.3
Nationalist	Albert Kalbfell	113	0.5	+0.5
Independent	Michael O'Reilly	316	1.3	+1.3
Total formal votes		24,754	95.0	−3.0
Informal votes		1,294	5.0	+3.0
Turnout		26,048	91.2	−2.8
Party total votes
Labor		16,763	67.7	+9.0
Nationalist		7,675	31.0	−3.6
Independent	Michael O'Reilly	316	1.3	+1.3

=== Elections in the 1930s ===
==== 1937 ====
1937 Tasmanian state election: Denison
Party	Candidate	Votes	%	±%
Quota		3,469		
Labor	Edmund Dwyer-Gray (elected 1)	4,614	19.0	+11.8
Labor	Robert Cosgrove (elected 2)	4,314	17.8	+1.9
Labor	Charles Culley (elected 3)	2,514	10.4	−1.2
Labor	Francis Heerey (elected 4)	1,919	7.9	+7.9
Labor	Alfred White	686	2.8	+1.1
Labor	John Lattin	194	0.8	+0.8
Nationalist	John Soundy (elected 5)	2,660	11.0	−4.1
Nationalist	Arndell Lewis (elected 6)	2,466	10.2	+6.1
Nationalist	Eric Johnson	1,444	5.9	−0.8
Nationalist	Ernest Turner	1,316	5.4	−0.8
Nationalist	D'Arcy Addison	517	2.1	−2.2
Independent	George Carruthers	1,007	4.1	−4.6
Independent	George Collis	554	2.3	+2.3
Independent	Frederick Lambert	73	0.3	+0.3
Total formal votes		24,278	98.0	+1.1
Informal votes		496	2.0	−1.1
Turnout		24,774	94.0	−1.1
Party total votes
Labor		14,241	58.7	−10.0
Nationalist		8,403	34.6	−3.2
Independent	George Carruthers	1,007	4.1	−4.6
Independent	George Collis	554	2.3	+2.3
Independent	Frederick Lambert	73	0.3	+0.3

==== 1934 ====
1934 Tasmanian state election: Denison
Party	Candidate	Votes	%	±%
Quota		3,292		
Labor	Robert Cosgrove (elected 1)	3,661	15.9	+9.4
Labor	Charles Culley (elected 3)	2,665	11.6	+11.6
Labor	Edmund Dwyer-Gray (elected 4)	1,662	7.2	+0.4
Labor	Gerald Mahoney	1,661	7.2	−4.1
Labor	Walter Woods	770	3.3	−0.9
Labor	Edgar Geer	422	1.8	+1.8
Labor	Alfred White	381	1.7	+1.7
Nationalist	John Soundy (elected 2)	3,489	15.1	+10.4
Nationalist	Eric Johnson	1,534	6.7	+6.7
Nationalist	Ernest Turner (elected 5)	1,419	6.2	−4.1
Nationalist	D'Arcy Addison	1,001	4.3	+4.3
Nationalist	Arndell Lewis	937	4.1	+0.6
Nationalist	Trevor Young	328	1.4	+1.4
Social Credit	George Carruthers (elected 6)	1,995	8.7	+8.7
Independent	William Jarvis	491	2.1	+2.1
Independent Labor	Thomas Jude	320	1.4	+1.4
Independent	Lesley Murdoch	192	0.8	+0.8
Independent	Robert Leitch	111	0.5	+0.5
Total formal votes		23,039	96.9	+0.3
Informal votes		736	3.1	−0.3
Turnout		23,775	95.1	−0.2
Party total votes
Labor		11,222	48.7	+8.4
Nationalist		8,708	37.8	−15.9
Social Credit	George Carruthers	1,995	8.7	+8.7
Independent	William Jarvis	491	2.1	+2.1
Independent Labor	Thomas Jude	320	1.4	+1.4
Independent	Lesley Murdoch	192	0.8	+0.8
Independent	Robert Leitch	111	0.5	+0.5

==== 1931 ====
1931 Tasmanian state election: Denison
Party	Candidate	Votes	%	±%
Quota		3,102		
Nationalist	John McPhee (elected 1)	5,068	23.3	+7.7
Nationalist	Ernest Turner (elected 2)	2,226	10.3	+10.3
Nationalist	Charles Grant (elected 5)	1,459	6.7	−2.9
Nationalist	John Soundy (elected 6)	1,026	4.7	−3.0
Nationalist	Arndell Lewis	754	3.5	+3.5
Nationalist	George Gilmore	384	1.8	+1.8
Nationalist	Charles O'Conor	336	1.5	+1.5
Nationalist	Maurice Susman	248	1.1	+1.1
Nationalist	Alfred Richardson	152	0.7	+0.7
Labor	Gerald Mahoney (elected 3)	2,463	11.3	+11.3
Labor	Edmund Dwyer-Gray (elected 4)	1,486	6.7	−1.2
Labor	Robert Cosgrove	1,405	6.5	−0.5
Labor	Arthur Tyler	1,328	6.1	+6.1
Labor	Walter Woods	909	4.2	−3.9
Labor	Frederick Bates	640	2.9	+2.9
Labor	John Cleary	508	2.3	−0.9
Independent	James Counsel	585	2.7	+2.7
Independent	Archibald Park	410	1.9	+1.9
Independent	David Dicker	322	1.5	+1.5
Total formal votes		21,709	96.6	−0.7
Informal votes		775	3.4	+0.7
Turnout		22,484	95.3	+11.7
Party total votes
Nationalist		11,653	53.7	+13.3
Labor		8,739	40.3	−0.6
Independent	James Counsel	585	2.7	+2.7
Independent	Archibald Park	410	1.9	+1.9
Independent	David Dicker	322	1.5	+1.5

=== Elections in the 1920s ===
==== 1928 ====
1928 Tasmanian state election: Denison
Party	Candidate	Votes	%	±%
Quota		2,634		
Labor	Walter Woods (elected 4)	1,493	8.1	−0.8
Labor	Edmund Dwyer-Gray (elected 6)	1,461	7.9	+7.9
Labor	Robert Cosgrove (elected 5)	1,285	7.0	−2.7
Labor	John Brown	977	5.3	+5.3
Labor	Charles Culley	939	5.1	−5.9
Labor	John Cleary	595	3.2	−4.1
Labor	William Lloyd	502	2.7	+2.7
Labor	George Phillips	293	1.6	+1.6
Nationalist	John McPhee (elected 1)	2,872	15.6	+7.0
Nationalist	Charles Grant (elected 2)	1,774	9.6	+0.5
Nationalist	John Soundy (elected 3)	1,423	7.7	−4.2
Nationalist	Horace Walch	1,258	6.8	+6.8
Nationalist	George Davis	121	0.7	+0.7
Independent Labor	Gerald Mahoney	1,982	10.8	+3.1
Independent	William McHugo	1,057	5.7	+5.7
Independent	Richard Stamford	223	1.2	+1.2
Independent	John Graham	176	1.0	+1.0
Total formal votes		18,431	97.3	−0.6
Informal votes		519	2.7	+0.6
Turnout		18,950	83.6	+14.6
Party total votes
Labor		7,545	40.9	−8.5
Nationalist		7,448	40.4	−0.3
Independent Labor	Gerald Mahoney	1,982	10.8	+3.1
Independent	William McHugo	1,057	5.7	+5.7
Independent	Richard Stamford	223	1.2	+1.2
Independent	John Graham	176	1.0	+1.0

==== 1925 ====
1925 Tasmanian state election: Denison
Party	Candidate	Votes	%	±%
Quota		2,381		
Labor	Charles Culley (elected 2)	1,835	11.0	+2.0
Labor	Robert Cosgrove (elected 3)	1,612	9.7	+2.1
Labor	Walter Woods (elected 4)	1,490	8.9	+8.9
Labor	John Cleary (elected 6)	1,208	7.3	−6.4
Labor	Enid Lyons	998	6.0	+6.0
Labor	Eric Ogilvie	922	5.5	+5.5
Labor	Charles Metz	167	1.0	+1.0
Nationalist	John Soundy (elected 1)	1,989	11.9	+11.9
Nationalist	Charles Grant	1,524	9.1	+0.3
Nationalist	John McPhee (elected 5)	1,436	8.6	−5.4
Nationalist	Leslie Payne	994	6.0	+3.3
Nationalist	Frederick Wilson	276	1.7	+1.7
Nationalist	William Jarvis	258	1.5	+1.5
Nationalist	William Hammond	205	1.2	+1.2
Independent Labor	Gerald Mahoney	1,285	7.7	+7.7
Independent	Edith Waterworth	462	2.8	−3.7
Total formal votes		16,661	97.9	+0.5
Informal votes		360	2.1	−0.5
Turnout		17,021	69.0	+2.8
Party total votes
Labor		8,232	49.4	+9.7
Nationalist		6,682	40.1	−12.3
Independent Labor	Gerald Mahoney	1,285	7.7	+7.7
Independent	Edith Waterworth	462	2.8	−3.7

==== 1922 ====
1922 Tasmanian state election: Denison
Party	Candidate	Votes	%	±%
Quota		2,625		
Nationalist	John McPhee (elected 1)	2,568	14.0	+0.7
Nationalist	Charles Grant (elected 5)	1,729	9.4	+9.4
Nationalist	Robert Snowden (elected 4)	1,368	7.4	+1.2
Nationalist	William Mulcahy	1,229	6.7	+6.7
Nationalist	John Turner	1,172	6.4	+6.4
Nationalist	Leslie Payne	496	2.7	+2.7
Nationalist	Eric Stopp	372	2.0	+2.0
Nationalist	Albert Richardson	266	1.4	+1.4
Nationalist	Edward James	199	1.1	+1.1
Nationalist	Francist Foster	188	1.0	+1.0
Nationalist	Joseph Hatch	32	0.2	+0.2
Labor	John Cleary (elected 2)	2,510	13.7	−7.8
Labor	Charles Culley (elected 3)	1,659	9.0	+9.0
Labor	William Sheridan (elected 6)	1,474	8.0	+1.8
Labor	Robert Cosgrove	1,388	7.6	+2.7
Labor	Will Reece	266	1.4	+1.4
Independent	Edith Waterworth	1,187	6.5	+6.5
Independent	Alicia O'Shea Petersen	105	0.6	+0.6
Independent	William Lloyd	84	0.5	+0.5
Independent	William Michael	77	0.4	+0.4
Total formal votes		18,369	97.4	+0.4
Informal votes		487	2.6	−0.4
Turnout		18,856	66.2	+4.0
Party total votes
Nationalist		9,619	52.4	−3.3
Labor		7,297	39.7	−4.6
Independent	Edith Waterworth	1,187	6.5	+6.5
Independent	Alicia O'Shea Petersen	105	0.6	+0.6
Independent	William Lloyd	84	0.5	+0.5
Independent	William Michael	77	0.4	+0.4

=== Elections in the 1910s ===
==== 1919 ====
1919 Tasmanian state election: Denison
Party	Candidate	Votes	%	±%
Quota		2,491		
Nationalist	Elliot Lewis (elected 2)	2,564	14.7	−1.2
Nationalist	John McPhee (elected 3)	2,316	13.3	+2.7
Nationalist	Duncan McRae	1,225	7.0	+7.0
Nationalist	George Foster	1,151	6.6	+6.6
Nationalist	Robert Snowden (elected 6)	1,086	6.2	+6.2
Nationalist	Charles Hoggins	937	5.4	+5.4
Nationalist	William Bottrill	424	2.4	+2.4
Labor	John Cleary (elected 1)	3,751	21.5	+7.0
Labor	William Sheridan (elected 4)	1,085	6.2	−13.4
Labor	Robert Cosgrove (elected 5)	846	4.9	+0.3
Labor	Walter Woods	809	4.6	−8.3
Labor	Abraham Needham	801	4.6	+4.6
Labor	John Lewis	439	2.5	−3.0
Total formal votes		17,434	97.0	+2.6
Informal votes		543	3.0	−2.6
Turnout		17,977	70.2	−4.7
Party total votes
Nationalist		9,703	55.7	+5.3
Labor		7,731	44.3	−5.3

==== 1916 ====
1916 Tasmanian state election: Denison
Party	Candidate	Votes	%	±%
Quota		2,428		
Liberal	Elliott Lewis (elected 2)	2,709	15.9	+0.5
Liberal	William Burgess (elected 4)	2,258	13.3	+13.3
Liberal	William Fullerton (elected 6)	1,805	10.6	+1.7
Liberal	John McPhee	1,793	10.6	+10.6
Labor	William Sheridan (elected 1)	3,327	19.6	+12.7
Labor	Walter Woods (elected 3)	2,190	12.9	+3.5
Labor	John Cleary (elected 5)	1,194	7.0	+7.0
Labor	John Lewis	935	5.5	+5.5
Labor	Robert Cosgrove	784	4.6	+4.6
Total formal votes		16,995	94.4	−2.4
Informal votes		1,014	5.6	+2.4
Turnout		18,009	74.9	+6.1
Party total votes
Liberal		8,565	50.4	−1.6
Labor		8,430	49.6	+1.6

==== 1913 ====
1913 Tasmanian state election: Denison
Party	Candidate	Votes	%	±%
Quota		2,122		
Liberal	Elliott Lewis (elected 1)	2,292	15.4	−1.5
Liberal	Sir John Davies (elected 2)	1,902	12.8	+4.2
Liberal	William Fullerton (elected 4)	1,321	8.9	+8.9
Liberal	Francis Valentine	1,011	6.8	+0.3
Liberal	Frederick Rattle	620	4.2	+1.0
Liberal	William Bottrill	369	2.5	+2.5
Liberal	John Paterson	202	1.4	+1.4
Labor	Lyndhurst Giblin (elected 3)	1,760	11.9	+11.9
Labor	Walter Woods (elected 5)	1,393	9.4	−6.3
Labor	Vincent Barker (elected 6)	1,294	8.7	+1.7
Labor	William Sheridan	1,027	6.9	−5.8
Labor	Henry Edmonds	764	5.1	−1.4
Labor	Newham Waterworth	502	3.4	−0.5
Labor	Edward O'Brien	392	2.6	+2.6
Total formal votes		14,849	96.8	−0.5
Informal votes		491	3.2	+0.5
Turnout		15,340	68.8	−8.6
Party total votes
Liberal		7,717	52.0	+0.9
Labor		7,132	48.0	−0.9
