= Candidates of the 1934 Tasmanian state election =

The 1934 Tasmanian state election was held on 9 June 1934.

== Retiring Members ==
=== Labor ===
- Jens Jensen MHA (Wilmot)

=== Nationalist ===
- John McPhee MHA (Denison)

== House of Assembly ==
Sitting members are shown in bold text. Tickets that elected at least one MHA are highlighted in the relevant colour. Successful candidates are indicated by an asterisk (*).

=== Bass ===
Six seats were up for election. The Labor Party was defending two seats. The Nationalist Party was defending four seats.

Labor candidates	Nationalist candidates
**Thomas Davies***; Frederick Hall; Charles Lamp; John McDonald*; John Madden; **Victor Shaw***	Allen Hollingsworth*; Syd Jackson; **Claude James***; **Robert Murphy**; **John Ockerby***; **Herbert Postle**; Henry Thomson; Robert Wright

=== Darwin ===
Six seats were up for election. The Labor Party was defending two seats. The Nationalist Party was defending four seats.

Labor candidates	Nationalist candidates	Independent candidates
James Belton; **Thomas d'Alton***; **Philip Kelly***; Henry Lane; Joseph McGrath*	John Astell; **Thomas Butler**; Jack Chamberlain*; Frank Edwards*; Ernest Fenton; Robert Hamilton; **Edward Hobbs**; Cyril Horne; **Henry McFie**; **Frank Marriott***; John Wright	Stephen Broad

=== Denison ===
Six seats were up for election. The Labor Party was defending two seats. The Nationalist Party was defending four seats.

Labor candidates	Nationalist candidates	Independent candidates
Robert Cosgrove*; Charles Culley*; **Edmund Dwyer-Gray***; Edgar Geer; **Gerald Mahoney**; Alfred White; Walter Woods	D'Arcy Addison; Eric Johnson; **Arndell Lewis**; **John Soundy***; **Ernest Turner***; Trevor Young	George Carruthers*; William Jarvis; Thomas Jude (Ind Lab); Robert Leitch; Lesley Murdoch

=== Franklin ===
Six seats were up for election. The Labor Party was defending two seats. The Nationalist Party was defending three seats, although independent MHA Benjamin Watkins had joined the Nationalists and was running on their ticket.

Labor candidates	Nationalist candidates	Independent candidates
Edward Brooker*; **John Dwyer***; Charles Frost; **Albert Ogilvie***	**Henry Baker***; Albert Beard; **Sir John Evans***; George Harvey; **Alfred Seabrook**; **Benjamin Watkins**	Peter Murdoch; Benjamin Pearsall*

=== Wilmot ===
Six seats were up for election. The Labor Party was defending two seats. The Nationalist Party was defending four seats.

Labor candidates	Nationalist candidates	Independent candidates
Francis Cosgrove; Charles Metz; **Eric Ogilvie***; David O'Keefe*; Lancelot Spurr	**Llewellyn Atkinson**; Percy Best; **Alfred Burbury**; Donald Cameron*; **Neil Campbell***; Francis Foster; **Sir Walter Lee***; Harold Lord; Peter Sattler; Henry Wilson	George Becker* (Ind Lab)

== See also ==
- Members of the Tasmanian House of Assembly, 1931–1934
- Members of the Tasmanian House of Assembly, 1934–1937
