= Results of the 1931 Tasmanian state election =

Tasmanian state election, 9 May 1931 House of Assembly << 1928–1934 >>
Enrolled voters	118,730				
Votes cast	112,779		Turnout	94.99%	+13.10%
Informal votes	3,885		Informal	3.44%	+0.20%
Summary of votes by party
Party	Primary votes	%	Swing	Seats	Change
Nationalist	61,414	56.40%	+14.20%	19	+ 4
Labor	38,030	34.92%	–12.23%	10	– 4
Independent	9,450	8.68%	–2.07%	1	± 0
Total	108,894			30	

This is a list of House of Assembly results for the 1931 Tasmanian election.

== Results by division ==
=== Bass ===
1931 Tasmanian state election: Bass
Party	Candidate	Votes	%	±%
Quota		3,095		
Nationalist	Howard Barber (elected 1)	3,446	15.9	+15.9
Nationalist	Robert Murphy (elected 2)	2,989	13.8	+6.9
Nationalist	Claude James (elected 4)	2,155	9.9	−0.3
Nationalist	John Ockerby (elected 6)	1,684	7.8	−2.4
Nationalist	Henry Thomson	1,302	6.0	−1.5
Nationalist	Herbert Postle	1,145	5.3	+5.3
Nationalist	Benjamin Saunders	882	4.1	+4.1
Labor	Victor Shaw (elected 3)	3,064	14.1	+4.8
Labor	Thomas Davies (elected 5)	2,342	10.8	+3.8
Labor	George Becker	1,688	7.8	−5.1
Labor	Alfred Higgins	964	4.5	+1.3
Total formal votes		21,661	96.6	0.0
Informal votes		768	3.4	0.0
Turnout		22,429	94.7	+15.0
Party total votes
Nationalist		13,603	62.8	+17.4
Labor		8,058	37.2	−17.4

=== Darwin ===
1931 Tasmanian state election: Darwin
Party	Candidate	Votes	%	±%
Quota		3,248		
Nationalist	Thomas Butler (elected 1)	5,846	25.7	+25.7
Nationalist	Frank Marriott (elected 2)	2,788	12.3	−5.1
Nationalist	Henry McFie (elected 6)	1,953	8.6	−0.5
Nationalist	Edward Hobbs (elected 5)	1,659	7.3	−3.6
Nationalist	John Wright	1,180	5.2	+5.2
Nationalist	Colin Paul	225	1.0	+1.0
Labor	Thomas d'Alton (elected 3)	2,660	11.7	+11.7
Labor	Philip Kelly (elected 4)	2,186	9.6	−5.4
Labor	James Belton	1,523	6.7	−6.5
Labor	Joseph McGrath	392	1.7	+1.7
Labor	James Gray	378	1.7	+1.7
Independent	Fergus Medwin	1,667	7.3	+7.3
Independent	Daniel Brown	274	1.2	+1.2
Total formal votes		22,731	96.7	−0.1
Informal votes		768	3.3	+0.1
Turnout		23,499	95.2	+11.0
Party total votes
Nationalist		13,651	60.0	+14.3
Labor		7,139	31.4	−15.3
Independent	Fergus Medwin	1,667	7.3	+7.3
Independent	Daniel Brown	274	1.2	+1.2

=== Denison ===
1931 Tasmanian state election: Denison
Party	Candidate	Votes	%	±%
Quota		3,102		
Nationalist	John McPhee (elected 1)	5,068	23.3	+7.7
Nationalist	Ernest Turner (elected 2)	2,226	10.3	+10.3
Nationalist	Charles Grant (elected 5)	1,459	6.7	−2.9
Nationalist	John Soundy (elected 6)	1,026	4.7	−3.0
Nationalist	Arndell Lewis	754	3.5	+3.5
Nationalist	George Gilmore	384	1.8	+1.8
Nationalist	Charles O'Conor	336	1.5	+1.5
Nationalist	Maurice Susman	248	1.1	+1.1
Nationalist	Alfred Richardson	152	0.7	+0.7
Labor	Gerald Mahoney (elected 3)	2,463	11.3	+11.3
Labor	Edmund Dwyer-Gray (elected 4)	1,486	6.7	−1.2
Labor	Robert Cosgrove	1,405	6.5	−0.5
Labor	Arthur Tyler	1,328	6.1	+6.1
Labor	Walter Woods	909	4.2	−3.9
Labor	Frederick Bates	640	2.9	+2.9
Labor	John Cleary	508	2.3	−0.9
Independent	James Counsel	585	2.7	+2.7
Independent	Archibald Park	410	1.9	+1.9
Independent	David Dicker	322	1.5	+1.5
Total formal votes		21,709	96.6	−0.7
Informal votes		775	3.4	+0.7
Turnout		22,484	95.3	+11.7
Party total votes
Nationalist		11,653	53.7	+13.3
Labor		8,739	40.3	−0.6
Independent	James Counsel	585	2.7	+2.7
Independent	Archibald Park	410	1.9	+1.9
Independent	David Dicker	322	1.5	+1.5

=== Franklin ===
1931 Tasmanian state election: Franklin
Party	Candidate	Votes	%	±%
Quota		3,210		
Nationalist	Henry Baker (elected 1)	4,583	20.4	+10.3
Nationalist	Alfred Seabrook (elected 6)	1,612	7.2	+7.2
Nationalist	John Evans (elected 4)	1,593	7.1	−1.8
Nationalist	John Piggott	1,303	5.8	−8.4
Nationalist	Derrick Burgess	532	2.4	+2.4
Nationalist	Clarence Rennie	252	1.1	+1.1
Labor	Albert Ogilvie (elected 2)	3,930	17.5	−7.7
Labor	John Dwyer (elected 3)	1,531	6.8	+6.8
Labor	William McGann	661	2.9	+2.9
Labor	Edward Brooker	612	2.7	+2.7
Labor	John Hohne	413	1.8	−0.3
Independent	Benjamin Watkins (elected 5)	2,276	10.1	+10.1
Independent	Benjamin Pearsall	1,626	7.2	−0.5
Independent	Peter Murdoch	1,156	5.1	−0.7
Independent	George Collis	389	1.7	+1.7
Total formal votes		22,469	96.9	−0.3
Informal votes		707	3.1	+0.3
Turnout		23,176	95.5	+14.3
Party total votes
Nationalist		9,875	43.9	+6.5
Labor		7,147	31.8	−11.7
Independent	Benjamin Watkins	2,276	10.1	+10.1
Independent	Benjamin Pearsall	1,626	7.2	−0.5
Independent	Peter Murdoch	1,156	5.1	−0.7
Independent	George Collis	389	1.7	+1.7

=== Wilmot ===
1931 Tasmanian state election: Wilmot
Party	Candidate	Votes	%	±%
Quota		2,904		
Nationalist	Neil Campbell (elected 1)	3,611	17.8	+3.2
Nationalist	Walter Lee (elected 6)	2,495	12.3	−2.4
Nationalist	Llewellyn Atkinson (elected 4)	2,453	12.1	+12.1
Nationalist	Alfred Burbury (elected 5)	2,341	11.5	+11.5
Nationalist	Percy Best	1,732	8.5	−3.3
Labor	Jens Jensen (elected 2)	2,737	13.5	+7.2
Labor	Eric Ogilvie (elected 3)	2,214	10.9	+6.8
Labor	Herbert Osborne	1,040	5.1	+0.3
Labor	William Shoobridge	526	2.6	+0.9
Labor	Henry Lane	430	2.1	+2.1
Independent	John Williams	461	2.3	+2.3
Independent	Benjamin Whitham	284	1.4	+1.4
Total formal votes		20,324	95.9	0.0
Informal votes		867	4.1	0.0
Turnout		21,191	94.2	+13.6
Party total votes
Nationalist		12,632	62.1	+20.1
Labor		6,947	34.2	−16.7
Independent	John Williams	461	2.3	+2.3
Independent	Benjamin Whitham	284	1.4	+1.4

== See also ==
- 1931 Tasmanian state election
- Members of the Tasmanian House of Assembly, 1931–1934
- Candidates of the 1931 Tasmanian state election
