= Members of the Tasmanian House of Assembly, 1941–1946 =

This is a list of members of the Tasmanian House of Assembly between the 13 December 1941 election and the 23 November 1946 election. The term was elongated due to World War II.

Name	Party	Division	Years in office
Charles Atkins	Nationalist	Franklin	1941–1948
Henry Baker	Nationalist	Franklin	1928–1946
Hon Edward Brooker	Labor	Franklin	1934–1948
James Bugg	Labor	Darwin	1941–1946
Neil Campbell	Nationalist	Wilmot	1922–1955
Jack Chamberlain	Nationalist	Darwin	1934–1951
Hon Robert Cosgrove	Labor	Denison	1919–1922; 1925–1931; 1934–1958
Hon Charles Culley	Labor	Denison	1922–1928; 1934–1948
Hon Thomas d'Alton^{[3]}	Labor	Darwin	1931–1944
Hon Thomas Davies^{[1]}	Labor	Bass	1929–1942
John Dwyer	Labor	Franklin	1931–1962
Hon Edmund Dwyer-Gray^{[5]}	Labor	Denison	1928–1945
Robert Harvey^{[6]}	Nationalist	Denison	1946
Francis Heerey^{[5]}	Labor	Denison	1937–1941; 1945–1946
Henry Hope	Labor	Franklin	1941–1946; 1948–1950
Hon Eric Howroyd	Labor	Bass	1937–1950; 1958–1959
Philip Kelly	Labor	Darwin	1922–1946
Henry Lane	Labor	Darwin	1926–1928; 1937–1946
Hon Sir Walter Lee	Nationalist	Wilmot	1909–1946
John McDonald^{[4]}	Labor	Bass	1934–1945
Henry McFie	Nationalist	Darwin	1925–1934; 1941–1948
Thomas McKinley	Labor	Franklin	1941–1946
Hon Sir John McPhee	Nationalist	Franklin	1919–1934; 1941–1946
Hon John Madden	Labor	Bass	1936–1956; 1957–1969
Frank Marriott	Nationalist	Bass	1922–1946
John Ockerby	Nationalist/Independent	Bass	1928–1946
David O'Keefe^{[2]}	Labor	Wilmot	1934–1943
Peter Pike^{[2]}	Labor	Wilmot	1943–1949
John Quintal^{[1]}	Labor	Bass	1942–1946
Michael Adye Smith^{[3]}	Labor	Darwin	1944–1946
John Soundy^{[6]}	Nationalist	Denison	1925–1946
Lancelot Spurr	Labor	Wilmot	1941–1956
Hon William Taylor	Labor	Wilmot	1940–1946
Alan Welsh^{[4]}	Labor	Bass	1945–1946
Ernest West	Labor	Wilmot	1941–1946
Alfred White	Labor	Franklin	1941–1959

== Notes ==
^{1} Labor MHA for Bass, Thomas Davies, died on 11 September 1942. A recount on 23 September 1942 resulted in the election of Labor candidate John Quintal. Quintal was believed to be the first direct descendant of a Bounty mutineer to be elected to any Australian parliament.
^{2} Labor MHA for Wilmot, David O'Keefe, died on 21 July 1943. A recount on 5 August 1943 resulted in the election of Labor candidate Peter Pike.
^{3} Labor MHA for Darwin, Thomas d'Alton, resigned in April 1944. A recount on 26 April 1944 resulted in the election of Labor candidate Michael Adye Smith.
^{4} Labor MHA for Bass, John McDonald, resigned on 16 April 1945. A recount on 26 April 1945 resulted in the election of Labor candidate Alan Welsh.
^{5} Labor MHA for Denison, Edmund Dwyer-Gray, died on 6 December 1945. A recount on 20 December 1945 resulted in the election of Labor candidate and former MHA Francis Heerey.
^{6} Nationalist MHA for Denison, John Soundy, resigned to stand for the Hobart seat in the Legislative Council. A recount on 19 April 1946 resulted in the election of Robert Harvey.

== Sources ==
- Hughes, Colin A.; Graham, B. D. (1976). Voting for the South Australian, Western Australian and Tasmanian Lower Houses, 1890-1964. Canberra: Australian National University. ISBN 0-7081-1334-6.
- Parliament of Tasmania (2006). The Parliament of Tasmania from 1856
