= Results of the 1972 Tasmanian state election =

Tasmanian state election, 22 April 1972 House of Assembly << 1969–1976 >>
Enrolled voters	216,846				
Votes cast	205,803		Turnout	94.91	+0.47
Informal votes	7,533		Informal	3.66	–1.00
Summary of votes by party
Party	Primary votes	%	Swing	Seats	Change
Labor	108,910	54.93	+7.25	21	+ 4
Liberal	76,073	38.37	–5.61	14	– 3
United Tasmania Group	7,741	3.90	+3.90	0	± 0
Independent	5,546	2.80	+0.49	0	± 0
Other			–6.03		– 1
Total	198,270			35	

This is a list of House of Assembly results for the 1972 Tasmanian election.

== Results by division ==
=== Bass ===
1972 Tasmanian state election: Bass
Party	Candidate	Votes	%	±%
Quota		4,707		
Labor	Michael Barnard (elected 1)	7,051	18.7	+6.8
Labor	Allan Foster (elected 3)	4,558	12.1	+0.4
Labor	Mac Le Fevre (elected 6)	1,819	4.8	+0.6
Labor	Harry Holgate	1,654	4.4	+4.4
Labor	David Farquhar (elected 5)	1,580	4.2	+4.2
Labor	Laurence Lovett	740	2.0	−0.9
Labor	Jean Hearn	712	1.9	+1.9
Labor	Sheila Ryan	436	1.2	+1.2
Liberal	Bill Beattie (elected 2)	5,861	15.6	+3.7
Liberal	Neil Pitt (elected 4)	3,651	9.7	+9.7
Liberal	Max Bushby (elected 7)	2,136	5.7	−5.9
Liberal	Timothy Barrenger	2,068	5.5	−3.2
Liberal	James Henty	1,596	4.2	−2.1
Liberal	Henry Bertram	644	1.7	−1.7
Liberal	James Child	194	0.5	+0.5
Independent	Jim Mooney	1,688	4.5	+4.5
United Tasmania	Walter Austin	355	0.9	+0.9
United Tasmania	Jeffrey Weston	246	0.7	+0.7
United Tasmania	Julia Weston	166	0.4	+0.4
Independent	Pasqualino Santamaria	444	1.2	+1.2
Independent	John Carter	49	0.1	+0.1
Total formal votes		37,648	96.0	+0.7
Informal votes		1,552	4.0	−0.7
Turnout		39,200	94.8	+1.2
Party total votes
Labor		18,550	49.3	+6.9
Liberal		16,150	42.9	−3.3
Independent	Jim Mooney	1,688	4.5	+4.5
United Tasmania		767	2.0	+2.0
Independent	Pasqualino Santamaria	444	1.2	+1.2
Independent	John Carter	49	0.1	+0.1

=== Braddon ===
1972 Tasmanian state election: Braddon
Party	Candidate	Votes	%	±%
Quota		5,223		
Labor	Eric Reece (elected 1)	14,790	35.4	+1.2
Labor	Lloyd Costello (elected 3)	2,814	6.7	+1.4
Labor	Glen Davies (elected 2)	2,767	6.6	+6.6
Labor	Geoff Chisholm (elected 5)	2,042	4.9	+1.2
Labor	Sydney Ward (elected 6)	1,548	3.7	+0.1
Labor	Joseph Britton	1,138	2.7	−0.8
Labor	John Coughlan	969	2.3	+2.3
Labor	Josephus Hen	225	0.5	+0.5
Liberal	Ray Bonney (elected 4)	4,662	11.2	+11.2
Liberal	Wilfred Barker (elected 7)	2,839	6.8	−3.6
Liberal	Brian Archer	2,460	5.9	+5.9
Liberal	Jack Breheny	2,086	5.0	−1.5
Liberal	John Davis	1,231	2.9	+0.4
Liberal	Thomas Gardner	762	1.8	+1.8
Liberal	Leslie Woods	100	0.2	+0.2
United Tasmania	Noreen Batchelor	893	2.1	+2.1
United Tasmania	Anthony Weston	224	0.5	+0.5
Independent	Alexander Best	132	0.3	+0.3
Independent	John Chapman-Mortimer	96	0.2	+0.2
Total formal votes		41,778	96.8	+1.0
Informal votes		1,381	3.2	−1.0
Turnout		43,159	94.5	−0.2
Party total votes
Labor		26,293	62.9	+9.2
Liberal		14,140	33.8	−0.6
United Tasmania		1,117	2.7	+2.7
Independent	Alexander Best	132	0.3	+0.3
Independent	John Chapman-Mortimer	96	0.2	+0.2

=== Denison ===
1972 Tasmanian state election: Denison
Party	Candidate	Votes	%	±%
Quota		5,039		
Labor	Merv Everett (elected 2)	6,060	15.0	+2.1
Labor	Neil Batt (elected 4)	3,519	8.7	+1.1
Labor	Ken Austin (elected 5)	3,485	8.6	+0.4
Labor	Kevin Corby (elected 7)	2,136	5.3	+5.3
Labor	Ian Cole	1,466	3.6	+3.6
Labor	Gabriel Klok	884	2.2	+2.2
Labor	Kath Venn	607	1.5	+1.5
Labor	John Green	489	1.2	+1.2
Liberal	Max Bingham (elected 1)	9,630	23.9	+16.3
Liberal	Robert Mather (elected 3)	1,865	4.6	−3.2
Liberal	Bob Baker (elected 6)	1,523	3.8	−0.3
Liberal	George Brown	887	2.2	−1.7
Liberal	Ronald Banks	792	2.0	−3.5
Liberal	Hank Petrusma	724	1.8	+1.8
Liberal	Fred Johnson	485	1.2	+1.2
Liberal	Kathleen Sargison	228	0.6	+0.6
United Tasmania	Norman Laird	1,073	2.7	+2.7
United Tasmania	Alfred White	739	1.8	+1.8
United Tasmania	Ian Milne	536	1.3	+1.3
United Tasmania	Kevin Scott	431	1.1	+1.1
Independent	Nigel Abbott	1,193	3.0	+3.0
Independent	Bill Wedd	851	2.1	−4.0
Independent	Harry McLoughlin	600	1.5	+1.5
Independent	Elvie Cobern	63	0.2	+0.2
Independent	Joseph Armstrong	45	0.1	+0.1
Total formal votes		40,311	96.2	+1.2
Informal votes		1,572	3.8	−1.2
Turnout		41,883	94.3	+1.4
Party total votes
Labor		18,646	46.3	+2.6
Liberal		16,134	40.0	−7.4
United Tasmania		2,779	6.9	+6.9
Independent	Nigel Abbott	1,193	3.0	+3.0
Independent	Bill Wedd	851	2.1	−4.0
Independent	Harry McLoughlin	600	1.5	+1.5
Independent	Elvie Cobern	63	0.2	+0.2
Independent	Joseph Armstrong	45	0.1	+0.1

=== Franklin ===
1972 Tasmanian state election: Franklin
Party	Candidate	Votes	%	±%
Quota		4,840		
Labor	Eric Barnard (elected 1)	7,398	19.1	+4.2
Labor	Bill Neilson (elected 2)	6,622	17.1	+2.9
Labor	Doug Lowe (elected 3)	4,116	10.6	+4.0
Labor	Jack Frost (elected 6)	1,907	4.9	+1.2
Labor	Suzanne Davidson	939	2.4	+2.4
Labor	John Lacey	931	2.4	+2.4
Labor	John Dillon	577	1.5	+0.2
Labor	Albert Schluter	250	0.6	+0.6
Liberal	John Beattie (elected 4)	3,643	9.4	+9.4
Liberal	Doug Clark (elected 5)	3,339	8.6	−4.4
Liberal	Geoff Pearsall (elected 7)	1,888	4.9	−2.6
Liberal	Stanley Gough	1,210	3.1	−2.3
Liberal	Alan Duggan	997	2.6	+2.6
Liberal	Leslie Thirgood	901	2.3	−0.8
Liberal	Anthony Neilson	622	1.6	+1.6
Liberal	Josephine Green	296	0.8	+0.8
United Tasmania	Ron Brown	2,077	5.4	+5.4
United Tasmania	Rod Broadby	638	1.6	+1.6
United Tasmania	Brenda Hean	363	0.9	+0.9
Total formal votes		38,714	96.2	+0.7
Informal votes		1,548	3.8	−0.7
Turnout		40,262	95.3	−0.5
Party total votes
Labor		22,740	58.7	+6.6
Liberal		12,896	33.3	−10.9
United Tasmania		3,078	8.0	+8.0

=== Wilmot ===
1972 Tasmanian state election: Wilmot
Party	Candidate	Votes	%	±%
Quota		4,978		
Labor	Michael Polley (elected 3)	4,456	11.2	+11.2
Labor	Andrew Lohrey (elected 4)	3,992	10.0	+10.0
Labor	Roy Fagan (elected 2)	3,543	8.9	−3.9
Labor	Darrel Baldock (elected 5)	2,859	7.2	+7.2
Labor	William Anderson	2,543	6.4	−2.2
Labor	Charles Batt	2,422	6.1	+6.1
Labor	Douglas Cashion	2,384	6.0	−3.0
Labor	Peter Lawson	482	1.2	+1.2
Liberal	Angus Bethune (elected 1)	6,092	15.3	−1.9
Liberal	Ian Braid	2,537	6.4	+2.8
Liberal	Bob Ingamells (elected 6)	2,077	5.2	−5.2
Liberal	Reginald Chopping	1,921	4.8	+4.8
Liberal	Bert Bessell (elected 7)	1,754	4.4	−5.0
Liberal	Donald Paterson	1,292	3.2	+3.2
Liberal	Peter Patmore	757	1.9	+1.9
Liberal	Donald Smith	323	0.8	+0.8
Group B	Bruce Hill	314	0.8	+0.8
Group B	Norman Murfet	71	0.2	+0.2
Total formal votes		39,819	96.4	+1.3
Informal votes		1,480	3.6	−1.3
Turnout		41,299	95.7	+0.3
Party total votes
Labor		22,681	57.0	+10.5
Liberal		16,753	42.1	−5.9
Group B		385	1.0	+1.0

== See also ==
- 1972 Tasmanian state election
- Members of the Tasmanian House of Assembly, 1972–1976
- Candidates of the 1972 Tasmanian state election
