= Candidates of the 1972 Tasmanian state election =

The 1972 Tasmanian state election was held on 22 April 1972.

== Retiring Members ==
=== Labor ===
- Alexander Atkins MLA (Bass)

=== Centre ===
- Kevin Lyons MLA (Braddon)

== House of Assembly ==
Sitting members are shown in bold text. Tickets that elected at least one MHA are highlighted in the relevant colour. Successful candidates are indicated by an asterisk (*).

=== Bass ===
Seven seats were up for election. The Labor Party was defending three seats. The Liberal Party was defending four seats.

Labor candidates	Liberal candidates	UTG candidates	Ungrouped candidates
**Michael Barnard***; David Farquhar*; **Allan Foster***; Jean Hearn; Harry Holgate; Mac Le Fevre*; Laurence Lovett; Sheila Ryan	**Timothy Barrenger**; **Bill Beattie***; Henry Bertram; **Max Bushby***; James Child; **James Henty**; Neil Pitt*	Walter Austin; Jeffrey Weston; Julia Weston	John Carter; Jim Mooney; Pasqualino Santamaria

=== Braddon ===
Seven seats were up for election. The Labor Party was defending four seats. The Liberal Party was defending two seats. The Centre Party did not defend the one seat they had won in 1969.

Labor candidates	Liberal candidates	UTG candidates	Ungrouped candidates
Joseph Britton; **Geoff Chisholm***; **Lloyd Costello***; John Coughlan; Glen Davies*; Josephus Hen; **Eric Reece***; **Sydney Ward***	Brian Archer; **Wilfred Barker***; Ray Bonney*; **Jack Breheny**; John Davis; Thomas Gardner; Leslie Woods	Noreen Batchelor; Anthony Weston	Alexander Best; John Chapman-Mortimer

=== Denison ===
Seven seats were up for election. The Labor Party was defending three seats. The Liberal Party was defending four seats.

Labor candidates	Liberal candidates	UTG candidates	Ungrouped candidates
**Ken Austin***; **Neil Batt***; Ian Cole; Kevin Corby*; **Merv Everett***; John Green; Gabriel Klok; Kath Venn	**Bob Baker***; Ronald Banks; **Max Bingham***; George Brown; Fred Johnson; **Robert Mather***; Hank Petrusma; Kathleen Sargison	Norman Laird; Ian Milne; Kevin Scott; Sir Alfred White	**Nigel Abbott**; Joseph Armstrong; Elvie Cobern; Harry McLoughlin; Bill Wedd

=== Franklin ===
Seven seats were up for election. The Labor Party was defending four seats. The Liberal Party was defending three seats.

Labor candidates	Liberal candidates	UTG candidates
**Eric Barnard***; Suzanne Davidson; John Dillon; **Jack Frost***; John Lacey; **Doug Lowe***; **Bill Neilson***; Albert Schluter	John Beattie*; **Doug Clark***; Alan Duggan; **Stanley Gough**; Josephine Green; Anthony Neilson; **Geoff Pearsall***; Leslie Thirgood	Rod Broadby; Ron Brown; Brenda Hean

=== Wilmot ===
Seven seats were up for election. The Labor Party was defending three seats. The Liberal Party was defending four seats.

Labor candidates	Liberal candidates	Group B candidates
**William Anderson**; Darrel Baldock*; Charles Batt; **Douglas Cashion**; **Roy Fagan***; Peter Lawson; Andrew Lohrey*; Michael Polley*	**Bert Bessell***; **Angus Bethune***; **Ian Braid**; Reginald Chopping; **Bob Ingamells***; Donald Paterson; Peter Patmore; Donald Smith	Bruce Hill; Norman Murfet

== See also ==
- Members of the Tasmanian House of Assembly, 1969–1972
- Members of the Tasmanian House of Assembly, 1972–1976
