= Horace Strutt =

Australian Army officer and politician

Horace Strutt DSO, ED

Speaker of the Tasmanian House of Assembly
- In office 13 April 1955 – 28 October 1956
- Preceded by: Lancelot Spurr
- Succeeded by: Kevin Lyons

Member of the Tasmanian House of Assembly for Denison
- In office 23 November 1946 – 2 May 1959
- Preceded by: Francis Heerey
- Succeeded by: Sir Archibald Park
- In office 4 December 1959 – 10 May 1969
- Preceded by: Sir Archibald Park
- Succeeded by: Max Bingham

Personal details
- Born: 19 December 1902 Hobart, Tasmania
- Died: 5 November 1985 (aged 82) Hobart, Tasmania
- Party: Liberal Party

Military service
- Allegiance: Australia
- Branch/service: Australian Army
- Years of service: 1923–1944
- Rank: Brigadier
- Commands: 2/3rd Field Regiment (1940–41); 2/5th Field Regiment (1939–40); 6th Field Brigade (1938–39)
- Battles/wars: Second World War; Western Desert Campaign; Operation Compass; Battle of Greece; Battle of Crete; South West Pacific theatre
- Awards: Distinguished Service Order; Efficiency Decoration; Mentioned in Despatches

Horace William Strutt, DSO, ED (19 December 1903 – 5 November 1985) was an Australian Army officer and politician.

He was born in Hobart. He was elected to the Tasmanian House of Assembly in 1946 as a Liberal member for Denison. On 13 April 1955 he was elected Speaker of the House, serving until 28 October 1956. He lost his seat at the election held in May 1959 but returned to the House on 4 December that year in a recount following the death of Sir Archibald Park. He was defeated again in 1969.
