= John Edward Green =

John Edward Green may refer to:

- John Green (Australian politician) (born 1945), Tasmanian politician
- Johnny Green (gridiron football) (born 1937), American collegiate and professional football quarterback
