= Gertrude Cosgrove =

Dame Gertrude Ann Cosgrove DBE (née Geappen; 1882–1962) was the wife of Sir Robert Cosgrove (1884–1969), twice Premier of Tasmania. They married on 10 January 1911 at St. Mary's Catholic Cathedral, Hobart, Tasmania and had four children.

Gertrude Cosgrove was a staunch companion to her husband in his political career; their elder son, Robert, was killed in 1940 while serving with the Royal Air Force. Gertrude Cosgrove was treasurer of the West Hobart women's branch of the Australian Labor Party and active in the Australian Comforts Fund, the Country Women's Association, the Australian Red Cross and the Victoria League.

From 1916 she worked devotedly for the Elizabeth Street State School, Hobart. Her leisure activities included gardening and crochet. She was created a Dame Commander of the Order of the British Empire on 1 January 1947 and invested at Buckingham Palace by King George VI in 1949.

She died in 1962, survived by her husband and three children.
