= Leslie Payne =

Australian politician and military officer

Leslie Herbert Payne DSO VD ADC
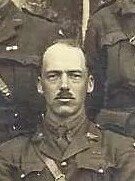
- Leslie Payne posing for a photo with several Australian Army Officers
- Born: 5 November 1888; Burnie, Tasmania, Australia
- Died: 23 December 1942 (aged 54); Hobart, Tasmania, Australia
- Relatives: Herbert Payne (father)
- Military career
- Branch: 40th Australian Infantry Battalion
- Rank: Lieutenant colonel
- Conflicts: First World War

Lieutenant-Colonel Leslie Herbert Payne DSO VD ADC (5 November 1888 – 23 December 1942) was an Australian politician and military officer.

He was born in Burnie, the son of Senator Herbert Payne. During the First World War, he served in the Australian Imperial Force. He was awarded the Distinguished Service Order in the 1918 New Year Honours.

In 1924, he was elected to the Tasmanian House of Assembly as a Nationalist member for Denison in a recount following Robert Snowden's resignation. He was defeated at the 1925 state election. Payne died in Hobart in 1942.
