= Eccles Snowden =

Australian politician

Sir Robert Snowden

Member of the House Assembly for Denison
- In office 31 May 1919 – 1 July 1924
- Preceded by: William Fullerton
- Succeeded by: Leslie Payne

Personal details
- Born: Robert Eccles Snowden; 22 March 1880; Hobart, Tasmania
- Died: 30 June 1934 (aged 54); London, England
- Political party: Nationalist Party

Sir Robert Eccles Snowden (22 March 1880 – 30 June 1934) was an Australian politician.

He was born in Hobart. In 1919 he was elected to the Tasmanian House of Assembly as a Nationalist member for Denison. He held the seat until his resignation in 1924. Snowden died in London in 1934.
