= The Voice (Tasmanian newspaper) =

Former weekly newspaper in Hobart, Tasmania, Australia

The Voice (People's Voice from 1925 to 1931) was a weekly newspaper in Hobart, Tasmania published from 1925 to 1953.

== History ==
It was established by Edmund Dwyer-Gray in 1925 as a Labor-aligned newspaper. The publishing and advertising were originally outsourced to Monotone Art Printers Pty Ltd, who also owned the Catholic Weekly and the Monotone Sporting Record, and in 1929 the company purchased the newspaper outright, though Dwyer-Gray continued as editor until his death.

Christie D. Stevens, the long-time associate editor, was appointed managing director and editor the month after Dwyer-Gray's death.

It ceased to exist c. 1953, by which time it had taken on an anti-communist position.
