= George Carruthers (politician) =

Australian politician

The Reverend George Carruthers
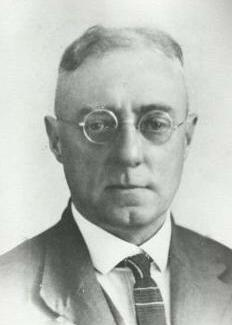

Member of the Tasmanian House of Assembly
- In office 9 June 1934 – 20 February 1937
- Constituency: Denison

Personal details
- Born: 1 February 1879 Lancaster, England
- Died: 29 June 1949 (aged 70) Hobart, Tasmania, Australia
- Party: Labor (before 1934, after 1940); Social Credit
- Education: Selwyn College, Cambridge

George Simpson Carruthers (1 February 1879 – 29 June 1949) was an Australian clergyman and politician. Born in Lancaster, England, he was elected to the Tasmanian House of Assembly in 1934 as an Independent member for Denison. He held the seat until 1937, when he was defeated. Carruthers died in 1949 at Hobart.

== Early life ==
Carruthers was born on 1 February 1879 in Lancaster, England. He was the son of Emma (née Roberts) and George Brockbank Carruthers.

Carruthers was educated in Lancaster and went on to Selwyn College, Cambridge, graduating Bachelor of Arts in 1901. He trained for the Anglican ministry at Ripon College Cuddesdon and was ordained deacon in 1903 and priest in 1905. He was the parish priest for periods at Clapham, Leeds, and Wetheral, before retiring due to ill health in 1909.

After leaving the ministry, Carruthers migrated to Australia and took up a fruit-growing property in New Norfolk, Tasmania. He later lived at Pelham and Magra. He was one of the original directors of the Derwent Valley Fruitgrowers' Co-operative Company Limited.

== Politics ==
During the Great Depression, Carruthers campaigned for unemployed workers and became associated with the social credit movement. He joined the Australian Labor Party (ALP) and was a regular contributor to The Voice, a Labor-affiliated newspaper edited by Edmund Dwyer-Gray. He advocated for national control of credit although his initial articles have been identified as closer to guild socialism than C. H. Douglas's social credit theories.

In the lead-up to the 1934 Tasmanian state election, Carruthers resigned from the Labor Party to stand as a social credit candidate in the seat of Denison. He was endorsed by the Douglas Social Credit Association (DSCA), which also endorsed three official Labor Party candidates: Edward Brooker, Charles Lamp and Joseph McGrath. His resignation apparently surprised other social creditors, as when Douglas had visited Australia earlier in the year he had advocated working within the existing political parties.

Carruthers "campaigned as an independent, attacking both major parties for their virtually identical policies and desire to liquidate old debts by borrowing more". He won the sixth and final vacancy in Denison, giving him the balance of power in the House of Assembly along with two other independents. His general support for the Labor Party during the next term of parliament allowed Albert Ogilvie to remain as premier.

== Personal life ==
Carruthers died of cancer in Hobart on 29 June 1949, aged 70.

== Sources ==
- Davis, Richard (1978). "Social credit and the Tasmanian Labor movement". Papers and Proceedings. 25 (4). Tasmanian Historical Research Association: 114–132.
