= John Green (Australian politician) =

Australian politician (1945–2020)

John Edward Green (10 September 1945 – 22 August 2020) was an Australian politician.

Green was born in Hobart and holds a Bachelor of Law. On 17 August 1974 he was elected in a recount to the Tasmanian House of Assembly to fill the vacancy in the seat of Denison caused by the resignation of Labor MP Kevin Corby. He held the seat until 1980, when he was defeated.
