= Vincent Shoobridge =

Australian politician

Vincent William Shoobridge (4 July 1872 – 5 August 1948) was an Australian politician.

He was born in Bushy Park, the son of William Shoobridge, also a politician. In 1940 he was elected to the Tasmanian House of Assembly as a Nationalist member for Franklin in a recount following George Doyle's death. He was defeated in 1941. Shoobridge died in 1948 in Hobart.
