= Francis McDermott =

Australian politician

Francis McDermott MBE (6 February 1874 – 24 August 1957) was an Australian politician.

He was born in Claremont in Tasmania. In 1939 he was elected to the Tasmanian House of Assembly as a Labor member for Franklin in a recount following the death of Premier Albert Ogilvie. He was defeated in 1941. McDermott died in Hobart in 1957.
