= Jim Mooney (Australian politician) =

Australian politician

Laurence James Mooney (5 May 1923 – 3 January 2007) was an Australian politician.

He was born in Ararat, Victoria. In 1976 he was elected to the Tasmanian House of Assembly as a Liberal member for Bass. He was defeated at the following election in 1979. He died in Low Head.
