= Alan Welsh (politician) =

Australian politician

Alan Henry Welsh (25 September 1899 – ?) was an Australian politician.

He was born in Fingal. In 1945 he was elected to the Tasmanian House of Assembly as a Labor member for Bass in a recount following John McDonald's resignation. He was defeated at the next election in 1946.
