= Michael Adye Smith =

Australian politician

Michael Adye Smith (30 January 1886 – 5 June 1965) was an Australian politician.

He was born in Sassafras in Tasmania. In 1944 he was elected to the Tasmanian House of Assembly as a Labor member for Darwin in a recount following the resignation of Thomas d'Alton. He was defeated at the election in 1946. Smith died in Latrobe in 1965.
