= Archibald Park =

Australian politician

Sir Archibald Richard Park CMG (18 September 1888 – 18 November 1959) was an Australian politician.

He was born in Wallsend in New South Wales. In 1949 he was elected to the Tasmanian House of Assembly as a Liberal member for Franklin. He held the seat until his resignation in 1955, the year in which he was appointed Companion of the Order of St Michael and St George. He served as Lord Mayor of Hobart from 1954 to 1959. Knighted in 1958, he was re-elected to the House as a member for Denison in 1959, but died in November of that year.
