= Henry Hope (politician) =

Australian politician

Henry James Hope (3 September 1912 – 30 September 1965) was an Australian politician.

He was born in Hobart. In 1941 he was elected to the Tasmanian House of Assembly as a Labor member for Franklin. He was defeated in 1946, but returned in 1948 as a member for Denison. He was defeated again in 1950. Hope died in Sydney in 1965.
