= Francis Foster (Tasmanian politician) =

Australian politician

Francis Henry Foster
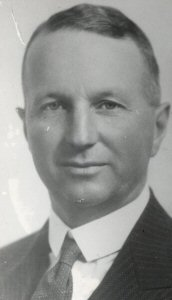
- Born: January 16, 1888; Brighton, Sussex, England
- Died: May 31, 1979 (aged 91); Hobart, Tasmania
- Occupations: Pastoralist; Businessman
- Office: Member of the Tasmanian House of Assembly
- Term: in office 1937–1941
- Spouse: Patricia Ainslie Wood
- Children: 6
- Parents: Henry Foster (father); Blanche Laura Foster, née Keach (mother)

Francis Henry Foster (16 January 1888 – 31 May 1979) was an Australian pastoralist, businessman and politician. He was born in Brighton, Sussex, England, the eldest son of Colonel Henry Foster, a Tasmanian farmer. His grandfather was John Foster, a Tasmanian farmer, businessman and politician, and his great-uncle was William Foster who had been Solicitor General for New South Wales and member of the New South Wales Legislative Assembly. After military service during the First World War, Francis Foster was a successful businessman who served as member of the Tasmanian House of Assembly between 1937 and 1941.

== Early years ==
Francis Foster's father, Henry Foster, was born in Hobart, Tasmania to John Foster and his wife Ann but, after John's death in 1875, Ann took Henry and his siblings to be educated in England and they settled in Brighton. Henry attended Sandhurst Military Academy but did not obtain a commission and instead returned to Tasmania, where he married in 1887. A few months later, Henry took his new wife to England and Francis was born in Brighton in 1888. The following year, after Henry's brothers had both completed their university studies, the Foster family (Henry, his wife and son, and two sisters and two brothers) all returned to Tasmania. Francis Foster then remained in Australia until after he had completed his own university education.

== Education ==
Francis Foster studied at Launceston Church Grammar School before entering Trinity College (University of Melbourne) where he obtain a bachelor's degree in civil engineering in 1911. He briefly worked as a civil engineer, including under Sir John Monash, before travelling to England 1912 with his parents, where he visited a number of industrial establishments. The following year, he travelled through Queensland, visiting pastoral properties. Both trips influenced his future career.

== First World War ==
In 1915 Francis Foster was commissioned into the Militia and subsequently transferred to the Australian Imperial Force in February 1918, before serving in France with the 4th Field Company, Royal Australian Engineers. He returned to Australia as a lieutenant in August 1919. Both his father, Henry Foster, and younger brother, John Askin Foster, also served in the AIF during WW1. Both were at Gallipoli and John went on to serve in France, where he was killed in action in August 1918.

== Farming and business career ==
As his brother had died during the war, Francis Foster became responsible for the management of the farms that the family owned in Tasmania. From 1925, he extended his interests to Queensland, purchasing land and company shares there. This proved to be a shrewd investment; by 1990, after his death, the Financial Review was able to report that "The Foster family wealth is generated by a 51% shareholding in the North Australian Pastoral Company, which controls about 45,000 square kilometres in the Northern Territory and Queensland and has four properties in Tasmania." His other business interests included directorships with several financial and industrial companies in Tasmania. As a respected business leader he chaired the Tasmanian Meat Board and was president of the Tasmanian Farmers Association.

== Public service ==
Francis Foster continued the tradition of public service that began with his grandfather and was continued by his father. He was elected to the Tasmanian House of Assembly in 1937 as a Nationalist member for Wilmot. He lost the seat in 1941 when the Labor Party increased its majority by two seats. Other roles included membership of the Agricultural Bank of Tasmania's postwar land development committee and of the board of inquiry into Bass Strait Islands transport facilities. Between 1943 and 1949, he chaired the Tasmanian committee of the Council for Scientific and Industrial Research, and became a trustee of the Tasmanian Museum and Art Gallery.

== Private life ==
In 1929 Francis Foster married Patricia Ainslie Wood in Hobart. They had six children: four daughters and two sons, all born in Hobart.

== Legacy ==
Francis Foster died at his home Hobart in 1979. He was cremated and his ashes placed in the family vault at Cornelian Bay Cemetery. He left a considerable estate of land and other assets for the benefit of his family. In 1990, the net worth of the Foster Family was estimated to be over A$40 million, and in 2004, his eldest son, Henry Foster, was described by ABC News as the wealthiest man in Tasmania.
