= 1937 Tasmanian state election =

State election in Australia

- 20 February 1937

All 30 seats to the House of Assembly
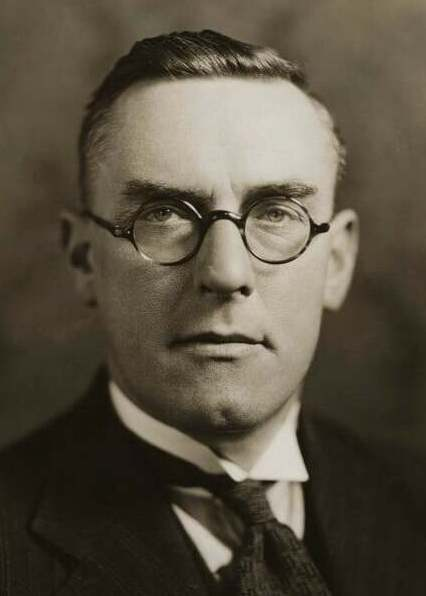

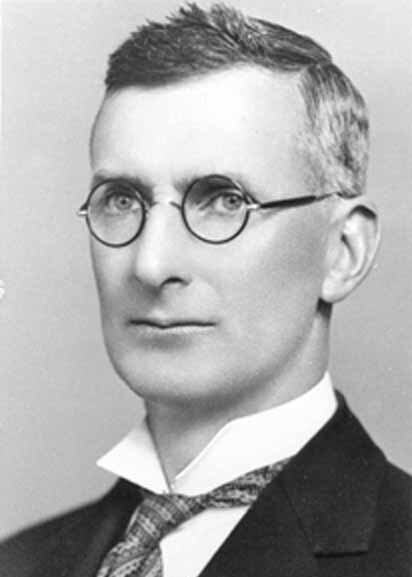
	First party	Second party
Leader	Albert Ogilvie	Henry Baker
Party	Labor	Nationalist
Leader since	October 1929	May 1936
Leader's seat	Franklin	Franklin
Last election	14 seats	13 seats
Seats won	18 seats	12 seats
Seat change	▲4	▼1
Percentage	58.67%	38.86%
Swing	▲12.89	▼7.86
- Results of the election
Premier before election
Albert Ogilvie
Labor
Elected Premier
Albert Ogilvie
Labor

The 1937 Tasmanian state election was held on 20 February 1937 in the Australian state of Tasmania to elect 30 members of the Tasmanian House of Assembly. The election used the Hare-Clark proportional representation system — six members were elected from each of five electorates.

The incumbent Labor government was led by Albert Ogilvie. The opposition Nationalist Party was led by Henry Baker.

Labor had a decisive win in the 1937 election, one that would see the Nationalist Party (later to become the Liberal Party) in opposition until 1969.

== Results ==
Party	Votes	%	+/–	Seats	+/–
Labor	71,263	58.67	+12.89	18	▲4
Nationalist	47,204	38.86	-7.86	12	▼1
Independents	2,996	2.47	-5.04	0	▼3
Total	121,463	100.00	–	30	–
Valid votes	121,463	97.59			
Invalid/blank votes	2,997	2.41	-0.79		
Total votes	124,460	100.00	–		
Registered voters/turnout	132,001	94.29	-0.18		

Popular vote
Labor	58.67%
Nationalist	38.86%
Independents	2.47%

Seats
Labor	60.00%
Nationalist	40.00%

== Distribution of votes ==
=== Primary vote by division ===
	Bass	Darwin	Denison	Franklin	Wilmot
Labor Party	63.1%	57.4%	58.7%	58.6%	55.4%
Nationalist	34.3%	42.0%	34.6%	41.4%	41.9%
Other	2.6%	0.5%	6.7%	–	2.8%

=== Distribution of seats ===
Electorate	Seats won
Bass	
Darwin	
Denison	
Franklin	
Wilmot	

Labor
Nationalist

== See also ==
- Members of the Tasmanian House of Assembly, 1937–1941
- Candidates of the 1937 Tasmanian state election
