= William Taylor (Tasmanian politician) =

Australian politician

Lieutenant-Colonel William Percy Taylor MC (15 March 1894 – 2 September 1964) was an Australian politician.

He was born in Cobar. In 1940 he was elected to the Tasmanian House of Assembly as a Labor member for Wilmot in a recount following Eric Ogilvie's resignation. He served as a minister from 1943 to 1946, when he was defeated for re-election. Taylor died in 1964.
