= Robert Harvey (Australian politician) =

Australian politician

Robert John Rankin Harvey (28 April 1897 – 14 June 1968) was an Australian politician.

He was born in Burra Burra in South Australia. In April 1946 he was elected to the Tasmanian House of Assembly as a Nationalist member for Denison in a recount following John Soundy's resignation. He was defeated at the state election in November. Harvey died in Hobart.
