= Basil Plummer =

Australian politician

Basil Owen Plummer OBE (20 March 1900 – 3 February 1968) was an Australian politician. He was born at Pokesdown, Bournemouth in England. In 1937 he was elected to the Tasmanian House of Assembly as a Labor member for Franklin, serving until his defeat in 1941. He died at Hobart in 1968.
