= Kevin Corby (politician) =

Australian politician (1928–2006)

Kevin Patrick Sean Corby (23 November 1928 – 14 September 2006) was an Australian politician in Tasmania.

In 1972 he was elected to the Tasmanian House of Assembly as a Labor member for Denison. He served until his resignation two years later in 1974.
