= Alfred Burbury =

Australian politician

Alfred William Burbury (31 January 1865 – 12 August 1944) was an Australian politician in Tasmania.

== Early life ==
Alfred William Burbury was born on 31 January 1865 in Oatlands in Tasmania. His father, William, was a farmer and politician; his mother was Christiana (née Whitney).

== Politics ==
In 1931 he was elected to the Tasmanian House of Assembly as a Nationalist member for Wilmot. He held the seat until his defeat in 1934.

== Other roles ==
Burbury was a farmer. He was deputy president of the Tasmanian Farmers', Stockowners', and Orchardists' Association. He was also a member of the Australian Meat Council, the Oatlands Municipal Council, and the Oatlands Road Trust.

He was mad a Justice of the Peace in 1911, and sat on the Royal Commission into Tasmanian Government Railways in 1923.

In 1930 and until at least 1937, Burbury was a member of the Animals and Birds Protection Board.

== Personal life and death ==
Burbury married Jean Irving Mitchell on 27 Sept 1899 in Lower Marshes. Their son, Frederick Burbury, also became a politician in the state government.

Burbury died in Hobart on 12 August 1944.
