= William Jarvis (Australian politician) =

Australian politician

William Robert Charles Jarvis (1 October 1871 – 15 August 1939) was an Australian politician.

== Early life and career ==
Jarvis was born in Hobart. In 1906, he was elected to the Tasmanian House of Assembly as the member for East Hobart. He stood for Denison with the introduction of proportional representation in 1909 but was defeated. He died in 1939 in Hobart.
