= Ken Austin (politician) =

Australian politician

Kenneth Ernest Austin (9 October 1914 – 14 August 1986) was an Australian politician.

He was elected to the Tasmanian House of Assembly in 1964 as a Labor member for Denison. He served as Chair of Committees from 1974 until his defeat in 1976. He died in Hobart.
