= Charles Atkins (Australian politician) =

Australian politician

Charles Norman Atkins (29 January 1885 – 25 October 1960) was an Australian politician.

He was born in Hobart. In 1941 he was elected to the Tasmanian House of Assembly as a Nationalist member for Denison. He served until his retirement in 1948. Atkins died in Hobart in 1960.
