= George Deas Brown =

Australian politician

George Deas Brown AM (6 September 1922 – 1 January 2014) was an Australian politician.

He was born in Hobart. In 1965 he was elected to the Tasmanian House of Assembly as a Liberal member for Denison in a recount following the resignation of Rex Townley. He was defeated at the next election in 1969.

His work with various community organisations such as the Winston Churchill Fellows Association, and the National Trust of Tasmania was recognised in 1997 when he was made a Member of the Order of Australia.
