= George Doyle (politician) =

Australian politician

George Leo Doyle (12 July 1902 – 26 October 1940) was an Australian politician.

He was born in Hobart. In 1937 he was elected to the Tasmanian House of Assembly as a Nationalist member for Franklin. He held the seat until his death in 1940.
