= Thomas Butler (Australian politician) =

Australian politician

Thomas John Butler (20 September 1875 – 8 July 1937) was an Australian politician.

He was born in Sheffield, Tasmania. In 1931 he was elected to the Tasmanian House of Assembly as a Nationalist member for Darwin. He was defeated in 1934. Butler died in Hobart in 1937.
