= Donald Keith Cameron =

Australian politician

Donald Keith Cameron (1 May 1887 – 6 June 1967) was an Australian politician. He was born in Chudleigh, Tasmania, the son of Norman Cameron, another Tasmanian politician. In 1934 he was elected to the Tasmanian House of Assembly as a Nationalist member for Wilmot, holding his seat until his defeat in 1937. He died in 1967 in Melbourne.
