= John McPhee (politician) =

Australian politician (1878–1952)

Sir John McPhee KCMG
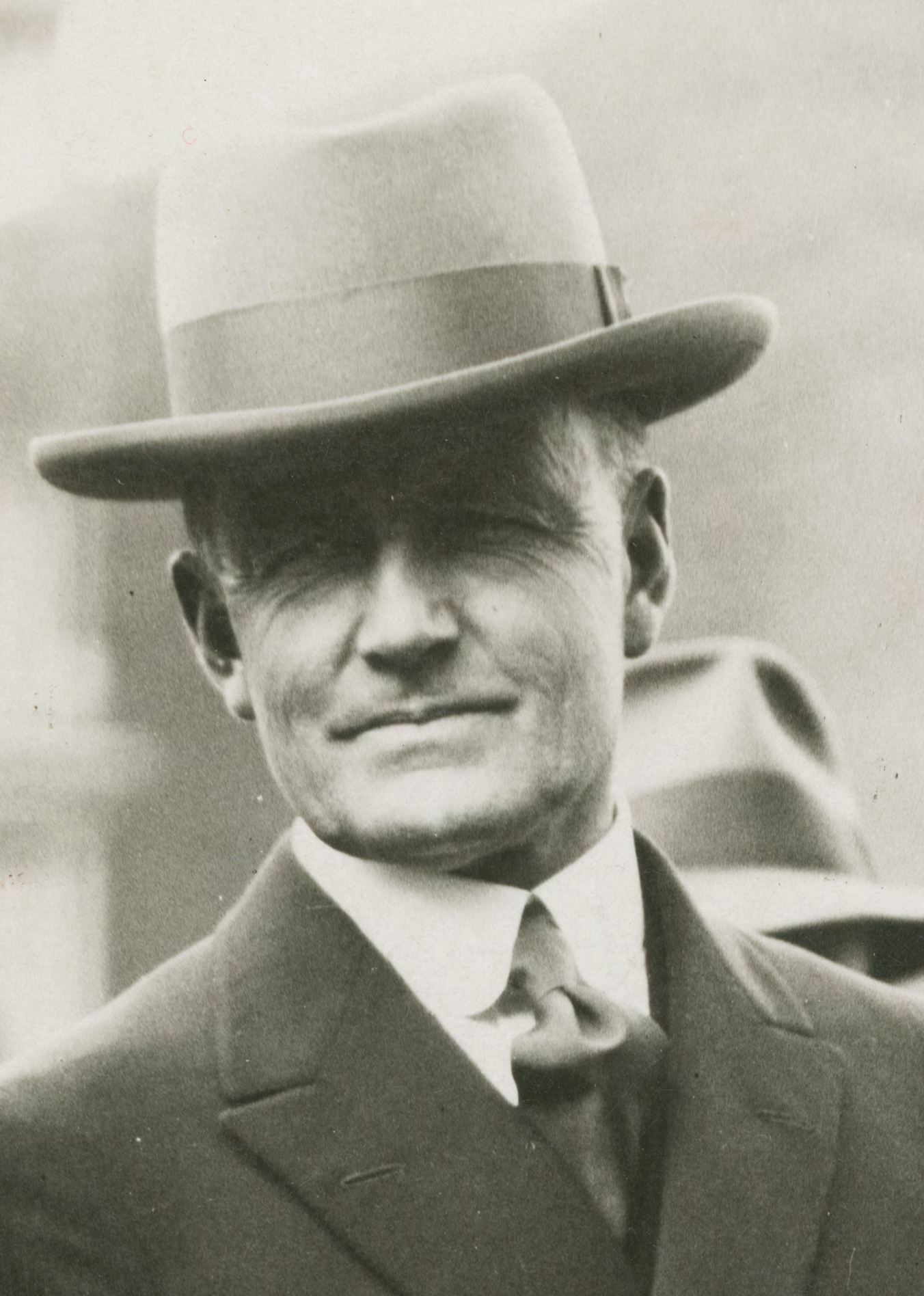
- McPhee in 1930

27th Premier of Tasmania
- In office 15 June 1928 – 15 March 1934
- Preceded by: Joseph Lyons
- Succeeded by: Sir Walter Lee
- Constituency: Denison (1919–1934); Franklin (1941–1946)

Personal details
- Born: 4 July 1878 Yan Yean, Victoria, Australia
- Died: 14 September 1952 (aged 74) Hobart, Australia
- Party: Nationalist Party of Australia
- Spouse: Alice Bealey Compton Dean

Sir John Cameron McPhee, KCMG (4 July 1878 – 14 September 1952) was an Australian politician and member of the Tasmanian House of Assembly. He was Premier of Tasmania from 15 June 1928 to 15 March 1934.

== Early life ==
McPhee was born in Yan Yean, Victoria, on 4 July 1878, to Scottish shopkeeper Donald McPhee and his Victorian-born wife Elizabeth McLaughlin. He was educated in state schools until the age of 14 and then spent some time working on the family farm. He then undertook a printing apprenticeship, and worked at a newspaper in Bairnsdale, where he learned reporting, compositing and typesetting.

McPhee moved to Hobart, Tasmania in 1908, where he ran a business college for a number of years. He also started a stationery and business equipment company (J. C. McPhee Pty Ltd), was co-proprietor of the Huon Times newspaper, and the director of several Tasmanian companies.

== Political career ==
McPhee was a strong supporter of the temperance movement, and was supported by temperance interests when he unsuccessfully stood for election to the Tasmanian House of Assembly at the 1916 election and a subsequent 1918 by-election. He was successful at the 1919 election, and won a seat in the Division of Denison for the Nationalist Party of Australia. McPhee was appointed to cabinet as Chief Secretary and Minister for Railways from 22 August 1922, but resigned both posts a year later for business reasons. In October 1923, the Premier Walter Lee was forced to resign by dissidents from the Nationalist and Country parties, and Joseph Lyons was asked to form a Labor government by the Governor of Tasmania. McPhee supported the Lyons government in a subsequent no-confidence vote and, as Opposition Leader from 29 July 1925, was noted for his co-operative and cordial relationship with Lyons.

Reversing the Nationalist Party's heavy defeat at the 1925 election, McPhee led the Nationalists to victory in the 1928 election, by a narrow single seat over Labor. He was sworn in as Premier on 15 June, also taking the portfolios of Treasurer, Minister for Forestry and the Hydro-Electric Department. The Nationalists won a landslide victory in the 1931 election, winning 19 out of the 30 seats with a nine-seat margin over Labor. Prior to the 1934 election, McPhee had been suffering recurring heart problems, and decided to stand down as Premier, handing over to Sir Walter Lee on 15 March and retiring from politics. He was knighted KCMG in June.

McPhee attempted a political comeback in 1937, unsuccessfully running for the seat of Denison at the 1937 federal election. He was more successful in the 1941 state election, winning a seat in Franklin, although Labor under Robert Cosgrove won that election. He retired on 23 November 1946 to concentrate on his business and humanitarian interests, and died in his sleep from cardiovascular disease, on 14 September 1952, aged 74, in Hobart.

Political offices
| Preceded by Joseph Lyons | Premier of Tasmania; 1928 – 1934 | Succeeded by Sir Walter Lee |
