= Francis Heerey =

Australian politician

Francis Xavier Heerey (21 September 1891 – 15 March 1964) was an Australian politician.

He was born in Beaconsfield, Tasmania. In 1937 he was elected to the Tasmanian House of Assembly as a Labor member for Denison. He served until his defeat in 1941, but he was returned to the House in 1945 in a recount following the death of Sir Edmund Dwyer-Gray. He was defeated again at the 1946 state election. Heerey died in Hobart in 1964. His diaries from his service in World War I were published posthumously in 2004.
