= John Wright (Tasmanian politician) =

Australian politician

John Forsyth Wright (29 June 1892 – 16 January 1947) was an Australian politician. Born at Castra, Tasmania, he was the elder brother of Roy Douglas Wright and Senator Reginald Wright, both of whom were knighted. He was elected to the Tasmanian House of Assembly as a Nationalist member for Darwin in 1940, in a recount following the resignation of Frank Edwards. Defeated in 1941, he died in 1947 at Ulverstone.
