= John Joseph McDonald =

Australian politician

John McDonald

Member of the Tasmanian House of Assembly for Bass
- In office 9 June 1934 – 16 April 1945
- Succeeded by: Alan Welsh

Personal details
- Born: 25 March 1904 Gormanston, Tasmania, Australia
- Died: 24 February 1959 (aged 54) Launceston, Tasmania, Australia
- Party: Labor Party
- Domestic partner: Marjorie Holgate
- Relations: James McDonald (father); Thomas Raymond McDonald (brother)

Military service
- Allegiance: Australia
- Branch/service: Australian Army
- Years of service: 1940–1943
- Rank: Lieutenant
- Unit: 1st Motor Brigade

John Joseph McDonald (25 March 1904 – 24 February 1959) was an Australian politician. He was a member of the Tasmanian House of Assembly from 1934 to 1945, representing the Australian Labor Party (ALP). He later served five years in prison for the manslaughter of his de facto wife.

== Early life ==
McDonald was born on 25 March 1904 in Gormanston, Tasmania. His father James McDonald and younger brother Thomas Raymond McDonald were also ALP members of parliament in Tasmania.

After leaving school, McDonald worked for Tasmanian Government Railways for a period but lost his job following the introduction of compulsory retrenchments. He later worked as a miner on the West Coast of Tasmania, including at Queenstown. McDonald eventually found work at the Patons and Baldwins mill in Launceston. He served as state president of the Australian Textile Workers' Union from 1933 to 1938, resigning following the introduction of rules that forbade the office of president being held by individuals not employed in the textile trade.

== Politics ==
McDonald was a member of the Tasmania House of Assembly for the electorate of Bass from 9 June 1934 until his resignation on 16 April 1945.

From 1940 to 1943, during World War II, McDonald served in the Australian Army with the 1st Motor Brigade, and was discharged with the rank of lieutenant.

== Later life ==
McDonald resigned from parliament in 1945 in order to work full time as a licensed bookmaker, based in Burnie.

In April 1951, McDonald was convicted of manslaughter after shooting dead Marjorie Holgate, his 26-year-old de facto wife, at a children's birthday party in Parklands. He was tried for murder in relation to the shooting, with the prosecution alleging that he had deliberately shot her in the head with a revolver after she threatened to leave him. In his defence, McDonald stated that Holgate was suicidal and had produced the revolver herself, which then "went off as they struggled. The jury found McDonald not guilty of murder but guilty of manslaughter, while adding a rider recommending mercy. He was sentenced to ten years' imprisonment by the presiding judge John Morris.

McDonald was released in April 1956, and then served as a public service clerk in the Public Works Department at Poatina until his death.
