= Ernest Turner (politician) =

Australian politician

Ernest William Turner (15 July 1876 – 7 December 1943) was an Australian politician.

He was born in Hobart. In 1931 he was elected to the Tasmanian House of Assembly as a Nationalist member for Denison. He was defeated in 1937 but returned in 1941 in a recount following Arndell Lewis's resignation. He was defeated again at the 1941 state election.
