= Joseph McGrath (Australian politician) =

Australian politician

Joseph William McGrath (1886 – 16 March 1937) was an Australian politician. He was born in Adelaide, South Australia. In 1934 he was elected to the Tasmanian House of Assembly as a Labor member for Darwin. He was re-elected in 1937 but died at Burnie before parliament resumed.
