= Benjamin Pearsall =

Australian politician

Benjamin James Pearsall (1 December 1878 – 18 January 1951) was an Australian politician. He was born in Rokeby, Tasmania, then known as Clarence Plains. In 1928 he was elected to the Tasmanian House of Assembly as an Independent member for Franklin. He was defeated in 1931 but re-elected in 1934, being defeated for a second time in 1937. His son Thomas and grandson Geoff later served as Liberal members of the House, with Thomas also serving in the Australian House of Representatives.
