= Henry Lane (politician) =

Australian politician

Henry Thomas Lane (29 December 1873 – 22 March 1955) was an Australian politician. He was born in Deloraine, Tasmania. In 1926 he was elected to the Tasmanian House of Assembly as a Labor member for Darwin, serving until he was defeated in 1928. He returned to the House in 1937 but was defeated again in 1946. Lane died in Devonport.
