= Arndell Lewis =

Australian politician

Lieutenant Colonel Arndell Lewis MC, ED

Member of the Tasmanian House of Assembly for Denison
- In office 14 March 1932 – 9 June 1934
- In office 20 February 1937 – 2 June 1941

Personal details
- Born: 23 November 1897 Perth, Tasmania
- Died: 27 December 1943 (aged 46) Hobart, Tasmania
- Party: Nationalist
- Parent: Sir Elliott Lewis (father)
- Education: University of Tasmania (LLD, LLM, LLB)

Military service
- Allegiance: Australia
- Branch/service: Australian Imperial Force (1916–20); Citizen Military Forces (1921–42); Second Australian Imperial Force (1942–43)
- Years of service: 1916–1920; 1921–1943
- Rank: Lieutenant Colonel
- Commands: Hobart Fortress (1940–42); 6th Field Artillery Brigade (1933–38)
- Battles/wars: First World War; Second World War
- Awards: Military Cross; Efficiency Decoration

Arndell Neil Lewis, MC, ED (23 November 1897 – 27 December 1943) was an Australian solicitor, soldier and politician.

Lewis was born in Perth, Tasmania, the son of barrister and politician Elliott Lewis and his wife Lina Henrietta (née Youl). In 1932 he was elected to the Tasmanian House of Assembly as a Nationalist member for Denison. Defeated in 1934, he returned to the House in 1937, remaining until his resignation in 1941. Lewis died in Hobart in 1943.
