= Eric Ogilvie =

Australian politician

Eric James Ogilvie (9 October 1892 – 3 April 1962) was an Australian politician. He was born in Hobart. In 1928 he was elected to the Tasmanian House of Assembly as a Labor member for Wilmot. He served until his resignation in 1940. Ogilvie died in Hobart in 1962.

He is the brother of former Premier of Tasmania Albert Ogilvie, and grandfather of House of Assembly member for Division of Denison Madeleine Ogilvie.
