= Robert Cosgrove =

Australian politician

The Honourable Sir Robert Cosgrove KCMG
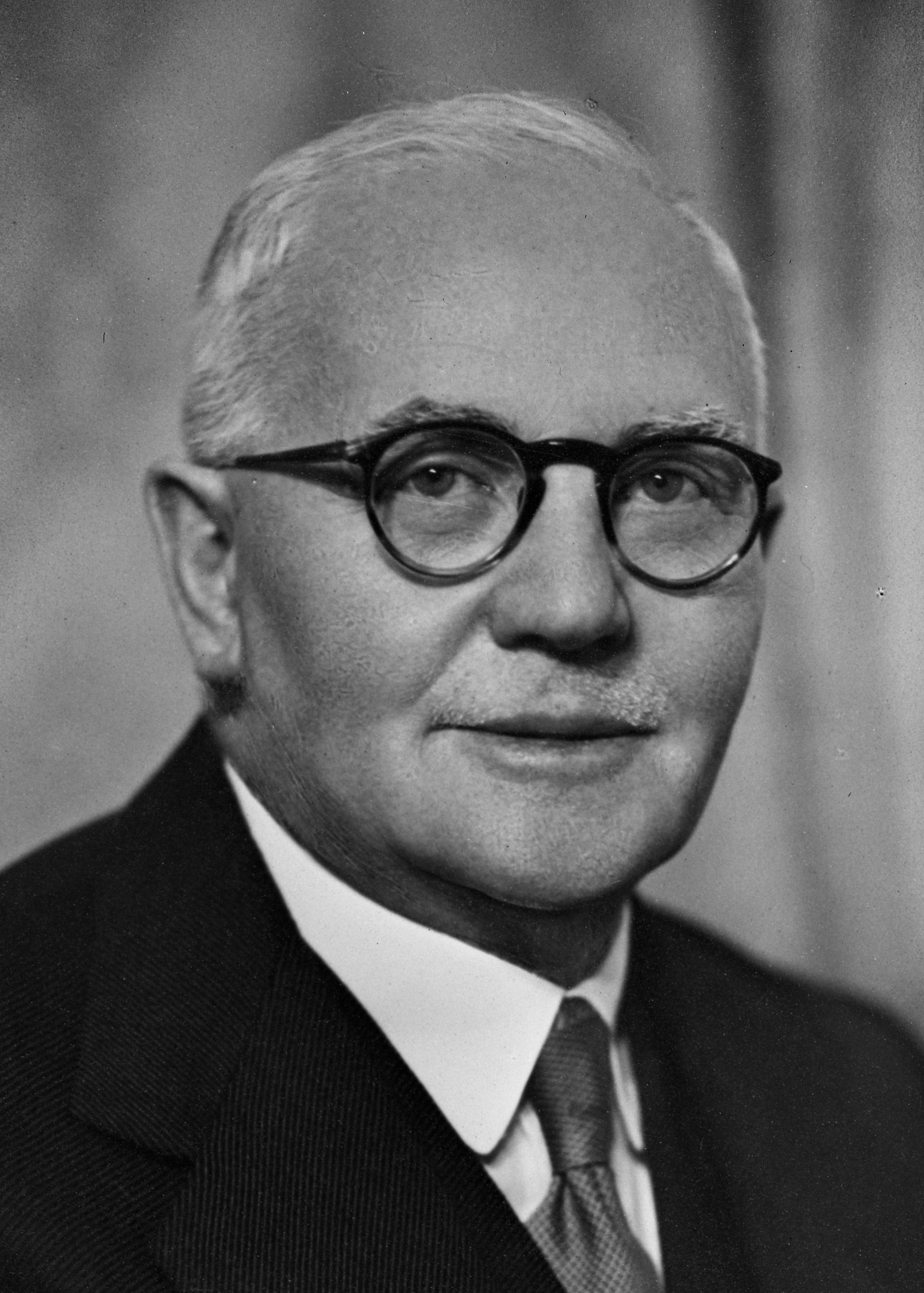
- Cosgrove in 1953

30th Premier of Tasmania
- In office 25 February 1948 – 26 August 1958
- Governor: Sir Hugh Binney; Sir Ronald Cross
- Preceded by: Edward Brooker
- Succeeded by: Eric Reece
- In office 18 December 1939 – 18 December 1947
- Governor: Sir Ernest Clark; Sir Hugh Binney
- Preceded by: Edmund Dwyer-Gray
- Succeeded by: Edward Brooker

Member of the Tasmanian House of Assembly for Denison
- In office 9 June 1934 – 25 August 1958
- In office 3 June 1925 – 9 May 1931
- In office 31 May 1919 – 10 June 1922

Personal details
- Born: 28 December 1884 Tea Tree, Tasmania, Australia
- Died: 25 August 1969 (aged 84) Hobart, Tasmania, Australia
- Party: Labor
- Spouse: Gertrude Geappen (m. 1911–1962)

Sir Robert Cosgrove KCMG (28 December 1884 – 25 August 1969) was an Australian politician who was the 30th and longest-serving Premier of Tasmania. He held office for over 18 years, serving from 1939 to 1947 and from 1948 to 1958. His involvement in state politics spanned five decades, and he dominated the Tasmanian branch of the Australian Labor Party for a generation.

== Early life ==
Cosgrove was born in Tea Tree, a rural locality close to Brighton, Tasmania. He was the fourth of eight children born to Mary Ann Hewitt and Michael Thomas Cosgrove; his father was born in Ireland. Cosgrove attended state schools in Campania, Sorell, and Richmond, before completing his education at St Mary's College, Hobart. Before entering politics, he worked as a grocer. He was involved with the United Grocers' Union, the Shop Assistants' Union, and the Storemen's and Packers' Union. From 1906 to 1909, he lived in Wellington, New Zealand, where he served on the council of the Wellington Trades Hall.

== Politics ==
After an unsuccessful candidacy in 1916, Cosgrove was elected to the Tasmanian House of Assembly at the 1919 state election, standing in the seat of Denison. He was defeated in 1922, re-elected in 1925, defeated again in 1931, and re-elected again in 1934. Thereafter he held his seat until his retirement in 1958.

Cosgrove served for periods as state president of the Labor Party's organisation wing and whip of the parliamentary party. He was appointed to the ministry in 1934, under Albert Ogilvie, with responsibility for agriculture, forests, and the Agricultural Bank of Tasmania. He reorganised the Department of Agriculture and was popular in rural areas.

== Premier of Tasmania ==
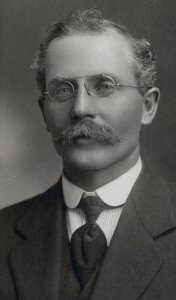
Sir Robert Cosgrove was the longest-serving Premier of Tasmania

When Albert Ogilvie died suddenly in 1939, 68-year-old Edmund Dwyer-Gray was elected Labor leader (and thus premier) with the understanding that he would retire after six months in office. Cosgrove was elected as his deputy, narrowly defeating Thomas D'Alton. He served as state treasurer until December 1939, when he swapped portfolios with Dwyer-Gray.

During World War II, Cosgrove co-operated closely with the federal government, particularly under Labor prime ministers John Curtin and Ben Chifley. Unlike many other state premiers, he was willing to cede certain state government powers to the Commonwealth indefinitely, and was thus able to secure generous concessions and federal aid for Tasmania. He was minister administering the Hydro-Electric Commission Act for sixteen years between 1942 and 1958. He appointed himself Minister for Education in 1948, and oversaw "an extensive school-building programme".

Cosgrove led his party to a significant victory at the 1941 state election, which saw Labor win 20 out of 30 seats. However, at all subsequent elections he and his party could muster only slim majorities. On several occasions he had to govern in minority with the support of independents. At the 1955 election, both Cosgrove's Labor Party and Rex Townley's Liberal Party won 15 seats. He was able to remain premier, but the following year one of his ministers, Carrol Bramich, defected to the Liberals. He called an early election, and won back one of the Liberals' seat to revert to the status quo of 15 seats each.

In December 1947, Cosgrove was indicted on charges of bribery and corruption. He stood down as Premier during his trial, and longtime minister Edward Brooker was sworn in as his replacement on 19 December 1947. The trial was concluded by February the next year, and Cosgrove was acquitted. Brooker stood down and Cosgrove was reinstated, appointing Brooker as Treasurer and Minister for Transport.

In 1950, despite considerable public opposition, the Cosgrove government passed special legislation to amend the boundaries of Mount Field National Park, enabling the sale of its finest stand of mountain ash for conversion into paper pulp. The decision was subsequently condemned as a spectacular act of government vandalism.

During the 1955 Labor Party split, Cosgrove was able to prevent the large-scale defections to the Democratic Labor Party seen in other states. However, the party did split ideologically to some extent, and some individuals (notably Reg Turnbull and Brian Harradine) eventually left the party to sit as independents.

Cosgrove fell ill in July 1958, and underwent surgery in Melbourne. He retired as premier on 25 August 1958, at the age of 73, and was replaced by his long-serving deputy Eric Reece, who kept Labor in power until 1969. Cosgrove was premier for 18 years and six months, the longest service in Tasmanian history. Only two other Australian state premiers have served for longer – South Australia's Thomas Playford IV (26 years) and Queensland's Joh Bjelke-Petersen (19 years), both of whom used gerrymandering to hold onto power. In 1959, Cosgrove was appointed Knight Commander of the Order of St Michael and St George (KCMG), one of the few Labor politicians to accept a knighthood.

== Other activities ==
Cosgrove was chairman of the Tasmanian Tourist Council and of the Southern Tasmanian Trotting Association. He was also a member of the council of the University of Tasmania (1940–46 and 1948–55) and of the local branch of the St Vincent de Paul Society, and president of the Royal Hobart Golf Club. After leaving politics, he served as chairman of Willowdene Development Co. Pty Ltd, a real estate firm.

== Personal life ==
Cosgrove married Gertrude Ann Geappen in 1911. They were married until her death in 1962. The couple had four children, including a son who was killed in World War II. Another son, Henry Cosgrove, became a judge of the Supreme Court of Tasmania.

Cosgrove died in Hobart on 25 August 1969. He was granted a state funeral and was buried at Cornelian Bay Cemetery.

Political offices
Preceded by Edmund Dwyer-Gray	Premier of Tasmania; 1939–1947	Succeeded by Edward Brooker
Preceded by Edward Brooker	Premier of Tasmania; 1948–1958	Succeeded by Eric Reece
