= John Soundy =

Australian politician

Sir John Soundy CBE
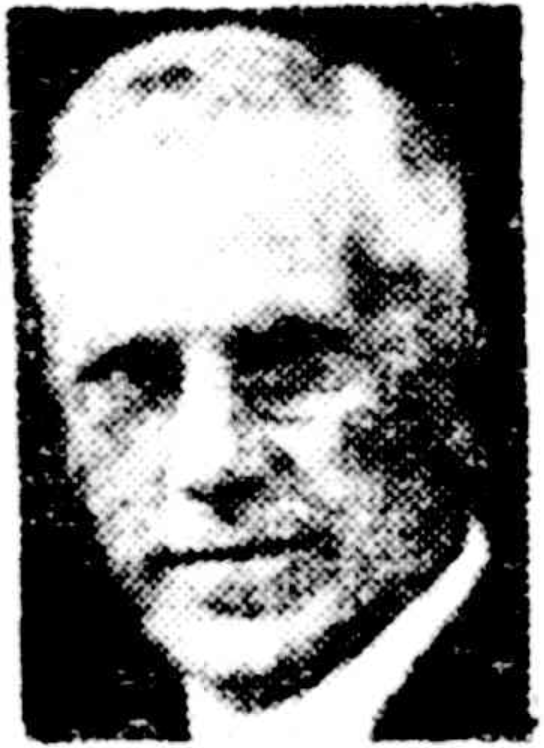

Chair of Committees Deputy-President of the Tasmanian Parliament
- In office 1948–1952

Member of the Tasmanian House of Assembly for Denison
- In office 1925–1946
- Succeeded by: Robert Harvey

Member of the Tasmanian Legislative Council for Hobart
- In office 1946–1952
- Preceded by: 3 member electorate: William Strutt; Dennis Lonergan; Charles Eady
- Succeeded by: Phyllis Benjamin

Lord Mayor of Hobart
- In office 1938–1946
- Preceded by: Joshua J. Wignall, C.M.G.
- Succeeded by: W. W. Osborne

Mayor of Hobart
- In office 1925
- Preceded by: J. A. McKenzie
- Succeeded by: Francis Valentine
- In office 1929–1932
- Preceded by: J. J. Wignall
- Succeeded by: Joshua J. Wignall, C.M.G.

Personal details
- Born: 14 November 1878 Dorchester, Dorset, England, UK
- Died: 25 October 1960 (aged 81) Hobart, Tasmania, Australia
- Party: Independent (from 1946); Nationalist (until 1946)

Sir John Soundy CBE (14 November 1878 – 25 October 1960) was an Australian politician.

He was born in Dorchester, Dorset, England. In 1925 he was elected to the Tasmanian House of Assembly as a Nationalist member for Denison. He concurrently served as Lord Mayor of Hobart from 1938 until 1946, when he resigned from the House to contest the Legislative Council seat of Hobart, successfully. He was Chair of Committees from 1948 to 1952, when he retired from politics. Knighted in 1954, Soundy died in Hobart in 1960.

Tasmanian Legislative Council
Preceded by Charles Eady; Dennis Lonergan; William Strutt	Member for Hobart; 1946–1952	Succeeded by Phyllis Benjamin
