= Walter Lee (Australian politician) =

Australian politician

The Honourable Sir Walter Lee KCMG
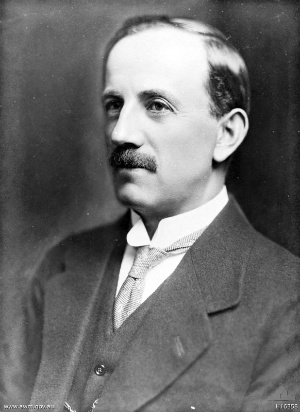
- Portrait by Jack Cato

24th Premier of Tasmania
- In office 15 April 1916 – 12 August 1922
- Preceded by: John Earle
- Succeeded by: John Hayes
- Constituency: Wilmot
- In office 14 August 1923 – 25 October 1923
- Preceded by: John Hayes
- Succeeded by: Joseph Lyons
- In office 15 March 1934 – 22 June 1934
- Preceded by: John McPhee
- Succeeded by: Albert Ogilvie

Personal details
- Born: Walter Henry Lee; 27 April 1874 Longford, Tasmania
- Died: 1 June 1963 (aged 89) Westbury, Tasmania, Australia
- Party: Nationalist
- Other political affiliations: Anti-Socialist; Liberal
- Spouse: Margaret Matilda Barnes

Sir Walter Henry Lee KCMG (27 April 1874 – 1 June 1963) was an Australian politician and member of the Tasmanian House of Assembly. He was Premier of Tasmania on three occasions: from 15 April 1916 to 12 August 1922; from 14 August 1923 to 25 October 1923; and from 15 March 1934 to 22 June 1934.

Lee was born in Longford in Tasmania's north-east, where he was educated to primary level at Longford State School. He joined his father's business, and later went into business with his brother as a wheelwright with Lee Bros.

Lee was elected to the Tasmanian House of Assembly at the 1909 election, representing the rural seat of Wilmot for the Anti-Socialist Party, which became the Tasmanian Liberal League and later the Nationalist Party. In 1915, Lee became Leader of the Opposition, and after the Liberals won 15 out of 30 seats at the 1916 election, Lee was sworn in as Premier of Tasmania (also serving as Minister for Education; and Chief Secretary until 1922). In spite of World War I, the first term of Lee's government was relatively smooth, and as the Nationalist Party, they retained government in the 1919 election with a one-seat majority.

At the 1922 election, the emergence of the Country Party split the anti-Labor vote. With the Country Party holding the balance of power, but openly antagonistic towards him, Lee resigned as Premier (after a record term) and handed over to John Hayes, who was unanimously elected premier in a coalition government, with Lee as Treasurer. Unable to resolve Tasmania's financial crisis, Hayes resigned after a year and Lee became premier again, but only for ten weeks, until he was defeated by a Labor no-confidence motion, and Labor's Joseph Lyons became Premier.

Lee became Premier for a third time in 1934, when as Deputy Premier he took over for John McPhee, who retired due to ill-health. His term lasted for three months, when Labor won the 1934 election, although he remained as Leader of the Opposition until July 1936. He would be the last non-Labor premier of Tasmania until 1969. He lost his seat in the 1946 election, where he ran as an Independent Liberal after failing to secure endorsement from the new Liberal Party.

He was knighted in the 1920 New Year Honours and appointed Knight Commander of the Order of St Michael and St George (KCMG) in the 1922 New Year Honours.

Political offices
Preceded by John Earle	Premier of Tasmania; 1916–1922	Succeeded by John Hayes
Preceded by John Hayes	Premier of Tasmania; 1923	Succeeded by Joseph Lyons
Preceded by John McPhee	Premier of Tasmania; 1934	Succeeded by Albert Ogilvie
