= Alfred White (politician) =

Australian politician

Sir Alfred John White (2 February 1902 – 31 August 1987) was an Australian politician.

He was born in Melbourne. In 1941 he was elected to the Tasmanian House of Assembly as a Labor member for Denison. He had a long career in Tasmanian state politics, serving as a state minister, before he resigned in 1959 to become Agent-General in London. On his retirement from that position in 1971 he was granted a knighthood. He ran as a candidate for Denison under the banner of the United Tasmania Group at the 1972 Tasmanian state election. White died in Hobart in 1987. His son, John, was also a state politician.
