= Albert Ogilvie =

Premier of Tasmania from 1934 until 1939

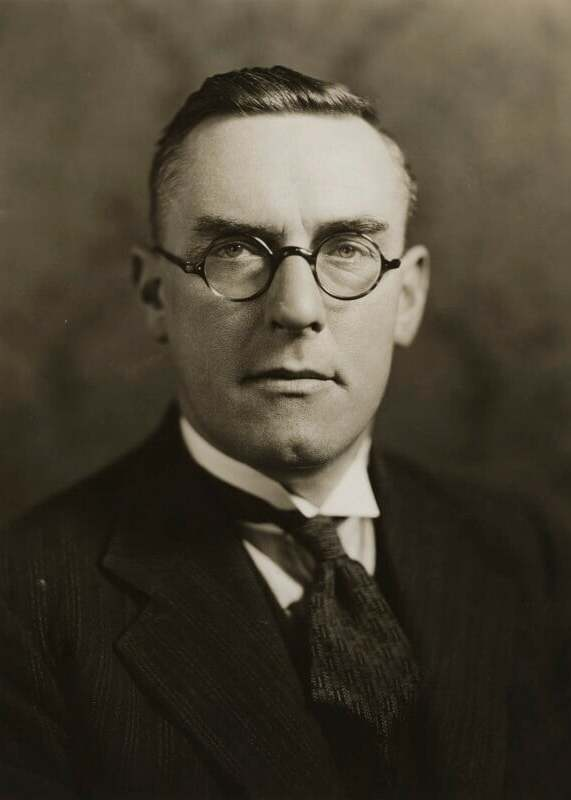
- Ogilvie in 1935

28th Premier of Tasmania
- In office 22 June 1934 – 10 June 1939
- Preceded by: Sir Walter Lee
- Succeeded by: Edmund Dwyer-Gray
- Constituency: Franklin

Personal details
- Born: 10 March 1890 Hobart, Tasmania
- Died: 10 June 1939 (aged 49) Warburton, Victoria, Australia
- Party: Labor Party
- Spouse: Dorothy Hines
- Education: University of Tasmania

Albert George Ogilvie (10 March 1890 – 10 June 1939) was an Australian politician and Premier of Tasmania from 22 June 1934 until his death on 10 June 1939.

== Early life ==
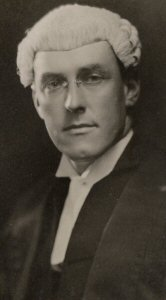
Ogilvie in barrister's garb

Ogilvie was born on 10 March 1890 in Hobart, Tasmania. His parents Kate (née McGee) and James Ogilvie were publicans who ran the Victoria Tavern in Hobart. His paternal grandfather had been transported to Australia as a convict.

Ogilvie attended Buckland's School in Hobart before completing his secondary education in Victoria at St Patrick's College, Ballarat. He graduated Bachelor of Laws at the University of Tasmania in 1913 and was admitted to the bar the following year, serving his articles of clerkship with Norman Ewing. In August 1921 Ogilvie successfully defended George William King, who had been accused of the murder of Chrissie Venn.

== Politics ==
Ogilvie was elected to the Tasmanian House of Assembly at the 1919 state election, aged 29. He was re-elected to the Division of Franklin on each subsequent election until his death.

=== Premier ===
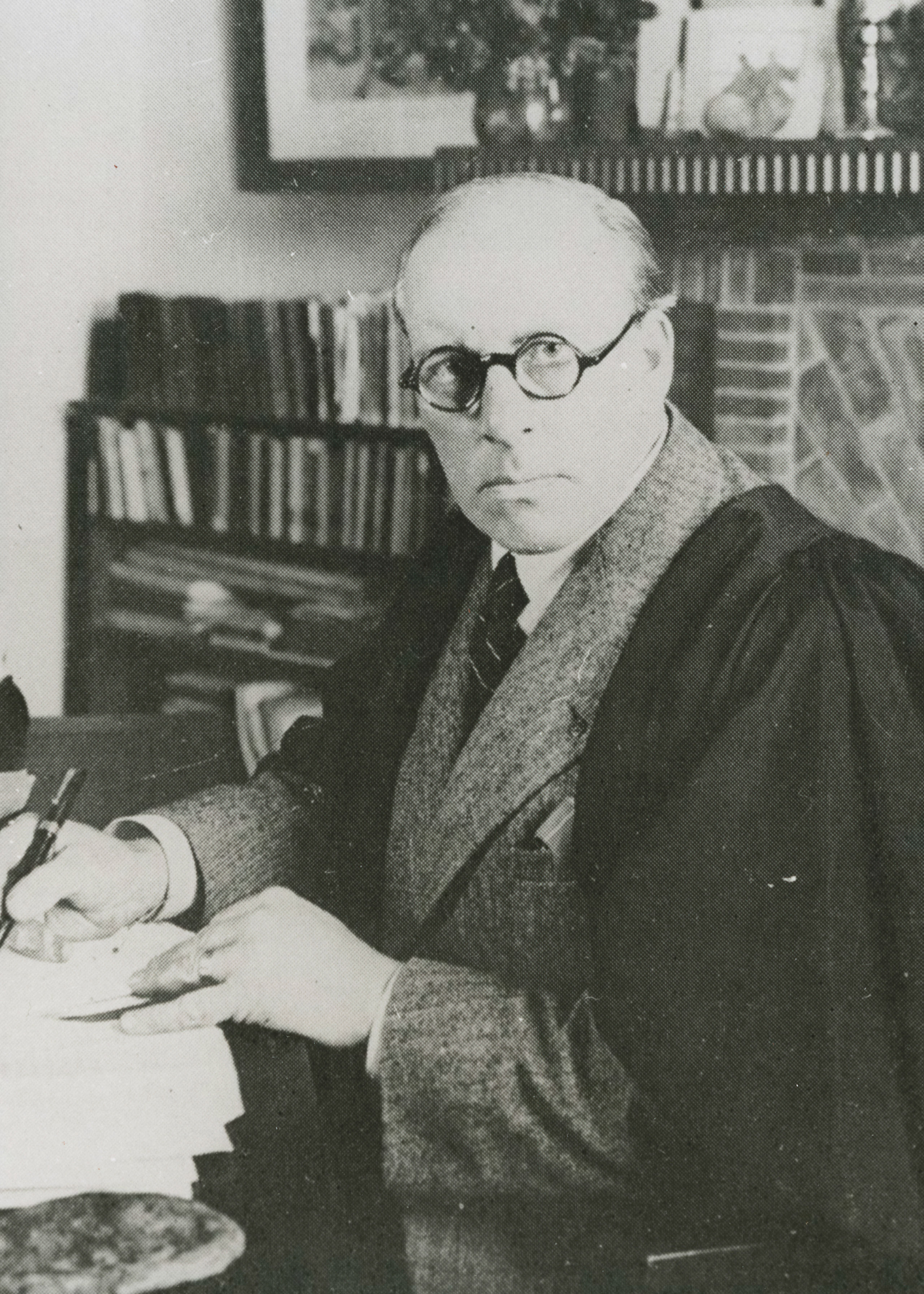
Ogilvie towards the end of his life

Under his premiership, hgih school fees were abolished, health care was improved, a modernisation of hospitals was carried out, unemployment relief was increased, and housing loans were provided for those in need.

== Legacy ==
The former New Town Commercial High School was renamed Ogilvie High School, in honour of the former premier, in 1940.

== Family ==
A brother Eric James Ogilvie, served as a member of parliament at the same time Albert was premier of Tasmania. Madeleine Ogilvie, granddaughter of Eric and great-niece of Albert, was elected to the House of Assembly for the seat of Division of Denison in 2014.

== Sources ==
- Ross McMullin, The Light on the Hill: The Australian Labor Party 1891-1991
- Serle, Percival (1949). "Ogilvie, Albert". Dictionary of Australian Biography. Sydney: Angus & Robertson.
- "Ogilvie, Albert". Members of the Parliament of Tasmania.

Political offices
Preceded by Ben Watkins (interim)	Opposition Leader of Tasmania; 1929–1934	Succeeded by Sir Walter Lee
Preceded by Sir Walter Lee	Premier of Tasmania; 1934–1939	Succeeded by Edmund Dwyer-Gray
