= Edmund Dwyer-Gray =

Australian politician

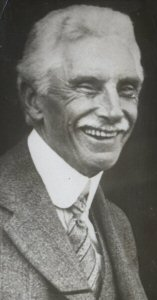

29th Premier of Tasmania
- In office 11 June 1939 – 18 December 1939
- Governor: Sir Ernest Clark
- Preceded by: Albert Ogilvie
- Succeeded by: Robert Cosgrove

Treasurer of Tasmania
- In office 18 December 1939 – 6 December 1945
- Premier: Robert Cosgrove
- Preceded by: Robert Cosgrove
- Succeeded by: Robert Cosgrove
- In office 22 June 1934 – 11 June 1939
- Premier: Albert Ogilvie
- Preceded by: Walter Lee
- Succeeded by: Robert Cosgrove

Member of the Tasmanian Parliament for Denison
- In office 30 May 1928 – 6 December 1945

Personal details
- Born: Edmund John Chisholm Dwyer Gray; 2 April 1870 Dublin, Ireland
- Died: 6 December 1945 (aged 75) Hobart, Tasmania, Australia
- Party: Labor
- Spouse: Clara Agatha Rose
- Parent: Edmund Dwyer Gray (father)
- Relatives: Sir John Gray (grandfather) Caroline Chisholm (grandmother)
- Occupation: Newspaper editor

Edmund John Chisholm Dwyer-Gray (2 April 1870 – 6 December 1945) was an Irish-Australian politician, who was the 29th Premier of Tasmania from 11 June to 18 December 1939. He was a member of the Australian Labor Party (ALP).

== Early life ==
He was born Edmund John Chisholm Dwyer Gray on 2 April 1870 in Dublin, Ireland, the son of Edmund Dwyer Gray, an MP in the British House of Commons and Caroline Agnes Gray. He was the maternal grandson of Caroline Chisholm, the English humanitarian renowned for her social welfare work with female immigrants to Australia. His paternal grandfather was Sir John Gray, the Irish Member of Parliament for Kilkenny City in the House of Commons, and an associate of the Irish nationalist Daniel O'Connell. He was educated at the Benedictine monastery at Fort Augustus, Scotland, and at Clongowes Wood College, a Jesuit school in County Kildare.

== Newspaper editorship and emigration to Australia ==
Gray first visited Australia in 1887, as he was suffering from rheumatism and hoped the climate might improve his health. He returned to Ireland shortly afterwards and joined the editorial committee of the Freeman's Journal, a nationalist newspaper of which his father and grandfather had been proprietors.

Between visits to Australia where he met and married his wife Clara, Gray continued to work on the Freeman's Journal which became involved in the Irish political scandal and leadership crisis when Charles Stewart Parnell married a divorced woman. Despite his family's support for Parnell, Gray altered the Journal's policy to compete with an anti-Parnell paper, causing some controversy and contributing to his decision to migrate to Australia permanently.

After some travel in Australia, New Zealand and Fiji where he was involved with some mining ventures, Gray spent ten years working as a farmer in New Norfolk, but by 1912 was in Hobart editing the Daily Post, an Australian Labor Party newspaper. When the paper was taken over by the Australian Workers' Union, Gray moved to Sydney, where he worked for Jack Lang briefly, before returning to Hobart to edit an ALP/ACTU newspaper called the People's Voice (later Voice), established by him in 1925 and continuing under his editorship until his death in 1945.

== Tasmanian politics ==
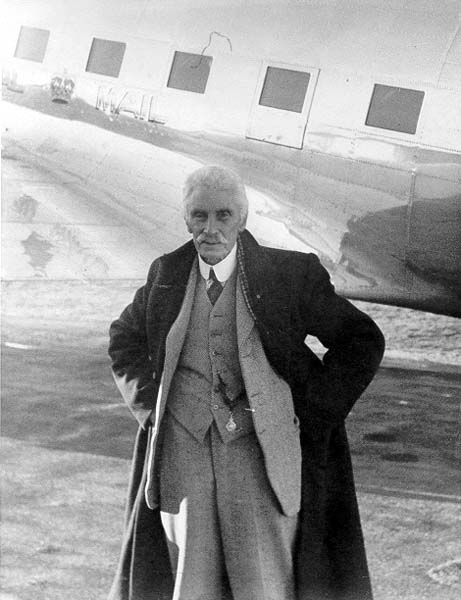
Dwyer-Gray in 1940

Gray unsuccessfully stood for the Tasmanian Legislative Council in 1915. At the 1928 state election, he hyphenated his name to Dwyer-Gray, so that he would be placed alphabetically at the top of the ballot paper thereby capturing the donkey vote. It may have worked—Dwyer-Gray was elected to the House of Assembly, representing the electorate of Denison for the Labor Party. He became deputy leader of the party in 1932, under Albert Ogilvie, and when Ogilvie won the 1934 state election, Dwyer-Gray became Treasurer and Deputy Premier in Ogilvie's cabinet.

As both Treasurer and editor of Voice, Dwyer-Gray was a proponent of the social credit concept pioneered by C. H. Douglas. He had visited New Zealand, which he saw as an ideal model and precedent for Tasmania's economy and society—a "worker's paradise" as he referred to it—should the Douglasite concept of national credit be adopted.

Albert Ogilvie died of a heart attack in office on 10 June 1939, and on 6 July Dwyer-Gray was elected as leader of the ALP, and hence officially became Premier of Tasmania, although only for six months due to an arrangement with fellow MHA Robert Cosgrove that he would stand aside for Cosgrove to assume the premiership in December 1939.

== Later life and legacy ==
In 1940, he wrote an article in Voice praising Adelaide herbalist and healer Mahomet Allum, calling him a "better Christian than most Christians".

Dwyer-Gray died in Hobart on 6 December 1945, survived by his wife, who died in 1947.

Although his ideas were radical for the time, Dwyer-Gray's insistent lobbying of Tasmanian-born Prime Minister Joseph Lyons to permanently solve the funding problem for small states like Tasmania enabled him as treasurer to bring post-Depression financial security to the state. While criticising Lyons' establishment of the Commonwealth Grants Commission in The Voice, Dwyer-Gray nonetheless gained favourable treatment for Tasmania, "bringing home the bacon" that allowed Cosgrove to fund public health, the public service and hydroelectric development.

Political offices
Preceded by Walter Lee	Treasurer of Tasmania; 1934–1939	Succeeded by Robert Cosgrove
Preceded by Thomas d'Alton	Minister Administering the Agricultural Bank; 1934	Succeeded by Robert Cosgrove
Preceded by Robert Cosgrove	Minister for Transport; 1938	Succeeded by Thomas d'Alton
Preceded by Albert Ogilvie	Premier of Tasmania; 1939	Succeeded by Robert Cosgrove
Preceded by Robert Cosgrove	Treasurer of Tasmania; 1939–1945	Succeeded by Robert Cosgrove
