= Electoral results for the Division of Bass (state) =

This is a list of electoral results for the division of Bass in Tasmanian elections since 1913.

== Election results ==
=== Elections in the 2020s ===
==== 2025 ====

Vote totals given here are first round vote tallies.

2025 Tasmanian state election: Bass
Party	Candidate	Votes	%	±%
Quota		8,432		
Liberal	Bridget Archer (elected 1)	13,108	19.4	+19.4
Liberal	Michael Ferguson (elected 3)	6,881	10.2	−7.9
Liberal	Rob Fairs (elected 5)	3,717	5.5	−2.9
Liberal	Simon Wood	1,348	2.0	−0.8
Liberal	Julie Sladden	1,747	1.9	−0.7
Liberal	Chris Gatenby	1,504	1.8	−0.4
Liberal	Sarah Quaile	1,448	0.9	−1.2
Labor	Janie Finlay (elected 2)	8,797	13.0	+2.2
Labor	Geoff Lyons	2,339	3.5	+1.0
Labor	Jess Greene (elected 7)	2,256	3.3	+3.3
Labor	Luke Moore	1,499	2.2	+2.2
Labor	Melissa Anderson	852	2.0	+0.7
Labor	William Gordon	1,112	1.9	+0.3
Labor	Peter Thomas	443	1.5	+1.5
Greens	Cecily Rosol (elected 4)	6,566	9.7	+3.4
Greens	Lauren Ball	1,013	1.5	+0.3
Greens	Charlene McLennan	871	1.3	+1.3
Greens	Anne Layton-Bennett	828	1.2	+0.2
Greens	Tom Hall	711	1.1	+0.1
Greens	Eric March	577	0.8	+0.8
Greens	Jack Fittler	542	0.8	+0.2
Shooters, Fishers, Farmers	Michal Frydrych	2,754	4.0	+1.6
Independent	George Razay (elected 6)	2,347	3.5	+1.7
Independent	Rebekah Pentland	1,705	2.5	−1.0
National	Angela Armstrong	684	1.0	−2.0
National	Carl Cooper	683	1.0	+1.0
Independent	Tim Walker	417	0.6	−0.2
Independent	Jack Davenport	405	0.6	+0.2
Independent	Caroline Larner	246	0.4	+0.4
Independent	Fenella Edwards	181	0.3	+0.3
Independent	Daniel Groat	135	0.2	+0.2
Total formal votes		67,450	93.6	+0.1
Informal votes		4,543	6.4	−0.1
Turnout		71,993	89.4	−1.2
Party total votes
Liberal		28,193	41.8	+3.8
Labor		18,564	27.5	-2.3
Greens		11,136	16.5	+4.5
Shooters, Fishers, Farmers		2,754	4.0	+1.6
Independent	George Razay	2,347	3.5	+1.7
Independent	Rebekah Pentland	1,705	2.5	−1.0
National		1,367	2.0	+2.0
Independent	Tim Walker	417	0.6	−0.2
Independent	Jack Davenport	405	0.6	+0.2
Independent	Caroline Larner	246	0.4	+0.4
Independent	Fenella Edwards	181	0.3	+0.3
Independent	Daniel Groat	135	0.2	+0.2
Independent gain from Lambie Network				

==== 2024 ====
Vote totals given here are first round vote tallies.

2024 Tasmanian state election: Bass
Party	Candidate	Votes	%	±%
Quota		8,491		
Liberal	Michael Ferguson (elected 1)	12,294	18.1	+12.4
Liberal	Rob Fairs (elected 4)	5,727	8.4	+8.4
Liberal	Simon Wood (elected 7)	1,949	2.9	+1.8
Liberal	Julie Sladden	1,747	2.6	+2.6
Liberal	Chris Gatenby	1,504	2.2	+2.2
Liberal	Sarah Quaile	1,448	2.1	+2.1
Liberal	Richard Trethewie	1,148	1.7	+1.7
Labor	Michelle O'Byrne (elected 2)	8,073	11.9	+0.3
Labor	Janie Finlay (elected 3)	7,337	10.8	+2.1
Labor	Geoff Lyons	1,698	2.5	+2.5
Labor	William Gordon	1,112	1.6	+1.6
Labor	Melissa Anderson	852	1.3	+1.3
Labor	Adrian Hinds	735	1.1	−1.4
Labor	Roshan Dhingra	443	0.7	+0.7
Greens	Cecily Rosol (elected 5)	4,283	6.3	+5.3
Greens	Lauren Ball	838	1.2	+1.2
Greens	Carol Barnett	787	1.2	+1.2
Greens	Tom Hall	711	1.0	−0.3
Greens	Anne Layton-Bennett	665	1.0	−0.6
Greens	Jack Fittler	441	0.6	+0.6
Greens	Calum Hendry	431	0.6	+0.6
Lambie	Rebekah Pentland (elected 6)	2,409	3.5	+3.5
Lambie	Angela Armstrong	2,033	3.0	+3.0
Lambie	Ludwig Johnson	1,088	1.6	+1.6
Shooters, Fishers, Farmers	Michal Frydrych	1,616	2.4	+2.4
Independent	Lara Alexander	1,518	2.2	+1.5
Independent	Greg (Tubby) Quinn	1,513	2.2	+2.2
Independent	George Razay	1,247	1.8	+1.8
Animal Justice	Ivan Davis	994	1.5	+1.5
Independent	Tim Walker	571	0.8	+0.8
Independent	Mark Brown	436	0.6	+0.6
Independent	Jack Davenport	278	0.4	−4.0
Total formal votes		67,926	93.5	−1.5
Informal votes		4,706	6.5	+1.5
Turnout		72,632	90.6	−0.0
Party total votes
Liberal		25,817	38.0	−21.9
Labor		20,250	29.8	+3.8
Greens		8,156	12.0	+2.8
Lambie		5,530	8.1	+8.1
Shooters, Fishers, Farmers		1,616	2.4	–0.1
Independent	Lara Alexander	1,518	2.2	+1.5
Independent	Greg (Tubby) Quinn	1,513	2.2	+2.2
Independent	George Razay	1,247	1.8	+1.8
Animal Justice		994	1.8	–0.4
Independent	Tim Walker	571	0.8	+0.8
Independent	Mark Brown	436	0.6	+0.6
Independent	Jack Davenport	278	0.4	–4.0

==== 2021 ====
2021 Tasmanian state election: Bass
Party	Candidate	Votes	%	±%
Quota		11,226		
Liberal	Peter Gutwein (elected 1)	32,482	48.2	+24.8
Liberal	Michael Ferguson (elected 3)	3,806	5.7	−15.3
Liberal	Sarah Courtney (elected 2)	2,227	3.3	−5.9
Liberal	Simon Wood	707	1.0	−1.4
Liberal	Greg Kieser	646	1.0	+1.0
Liberal	Lara Alexander	511	0.8	+0.8
Labor	Michelle O'Byrne (elected 4)	7,813	11.6	−5.2
Labor	Janie Finlay (elected 5)	5,830	8.7	+8.7
Labor	Adrian Hinds	1,663	2.5	+2.5
Labor	Jennifer Houston	1,512	2.2	−1.2
Labor	Owen Powell	706	1.0	−0.6
Greens	Jack Davenport	2,952	4.4	+4.4
Greens	Anne Layton-Bennett	1,091	1.6	+1.6
Greens	Tom Hall	886	1.3	+0.7
Greens	Cecily Rosol	691	1.0	+1.0
Greens	Mitchell Houghton	561	0.8	+0.8
Shooters, Fishers, Farmers	Andrew Harvey	1,649	2.4	+2.4
Animal Justice	Sue Woodbury	1,242	1.8	+1.8
Independent	Roy Ramage	377	0.6	+0.6
Total formal votes		67,352	95.0	+0.1
Informal votes		3,544	5.0	−0.1
Turnout		70,896	90.7	−1.1
Party total votes
Liberal		40,379	60.0	+1.1
Labor		17,524	26.0	−0.4
Greens		6,181	9.2	−0.1
Shooters, Fishers, Farmers		1,649	2.4	+2.4
Animal Justice		1,242	1.8	+1.8
Independent	Roy Ramage	377	0.6	+0.6
Liberal hold		Swing	+24.8	
Liberal hold		Swing	–15.3	
Liberal hold		Swing	–5.9	
Labor hold		Swing	–5.2	
Labor hold		Swing	+8.7	

=== Elections in the 2010s ===
==== 2018 ====
2018 Tasmanian state election: Bass
Party	Candidate	Votes	%	±%
Quota		10,831		
Liberal	Peter Gutwein (elected 1)	15,213	23.4	+0.1
Liberal	Michael Ferguson (elected 2)	13,640	21.0	−1.4
Liberal	Sarah Courtney (elected 4)	5,992	9.2	+4.5
Liberal	Bridget Archer	1,803	2.8	+2.8
Liberal	Simon Wood	1,567	2.4	+2.4
Labor	Michelle O'Byrne (elected 3)	10,924	16.8	+6.2
Labor	Jennifer Houston (elected 5)	2,258	3.5	+3.5
Labor	Brian Roe	1,564	2.4	+2.4
Labor	Adam Gore	1,333	2.1	+1.0
Labor	Owen Powell	1,075	1.7	+1.7
Greens	Andrea Dawkins	4,333	6.7	+5.9
Greens	Emma Anglesey	561	0.9	+0.9
Greens	Emma Williams	469	0.7	+0.7
Greens	Tom Hall	394	0.6	+0.6
Greens	James Ireland	270	0.4	+0.4
Lambie	Michelle Hoult	1,257	1.9	+1.9
Lambie	Gary Madden	675	1.0	+1.0
Lambie	Daniel Groat	548	0.8	+0.8
Lambie	Joshua Hoy	505	0.8	+0.8
Independent	Brett Lucas	597	0.9	+0.7
Total formal votes		64,978	94.9	−0.5
Informal votes		3,521	5.1	+0.5
Turnout		68,499	91.8	−1.1
Party total votes
Liberal		38,215	58.8	+1.6
Labor		17,154	26.4	+3.1
Greens		6,027	9.3	−3.4
Lambie		2,985	4.6	+4.6
Independent	Brett Lucas	597	0.9	+0.7
Liberal hold		Swing	+0.1	
Liberal hold		Swing	–1.4	
Liberal hold		Swing	+4.5	
Labor hold		Swing	+6.2	
Labor gain from Greens		Swing	+3.5	

==== 2014 ====
2014 Tasmanian state election: Bass
Party	Candidate	Votes	%	±%
Quota		10,744		
Liberal	Peter Gutwein (elected 1)	15,041	23.3	+9.1
Liberal	Michael Ferguson (elected 2)	14,418	22.4	−2.6
Liberal	Sarah Courtney (elected 3)	3,046	4.7	+4.7
Liberal	Barry Jarvis	2,582	4.0	+4.0
Liberal	Leonie McNair	1,795	2.8	+2.8
Labor	Michelle O'Byrne (elected 4)	6,852	10.6	−7.6
Labor	Brian Wightman	5,268	8.1	+3.1
Labor	Senka Mujkic	1,183	1.8	+1.8
Labor	Andrew Connor	1,007	1.6	+1.6
Labor	Adam Gore	692	1.1	+1.1
Greens	Kim Booth (elected 5)	6,661	10.3	−3.6
Greens	Andrea Dawkins	467	0.7	+0.7
Greens	Amy Tyler	369	0.6	+0.6
Greens	Anna Povey	366	0.6	+0.6
Greens	Anne Layton-Bennett	334	0.5	+0.5
Palmer United	Tim Parish	1,147	1.8	+1.8
Palmer United	Chris Dobson	910	1.4	+1.4
Palmer United	Mark Hines	672	1.0	+1.0
Palmer United	Brian Gunst	579	0.9	+0.9
Christians	Ray Kroeze	680	1.1	+1.1
Independent	Andrew Roberts	223	0.3	+0.3
Independent	Brett Lucas	167	0.3	+0.3
Total formal votes		64,459	95.4	+0.1
Informal votes		3,130	4.6	−0.1
Turnout		67,589	92.9	−0.9
Party total votes
Liberal		36,882	57.2	+14.6
Labor		15,002	23.3	−11.2
Greens		8,197	12.7	−8.3
Palmer United		3,308	5.1	+5.1
Christians		680	1.1	+1.1
Independent	Andrew Roberts	223	0.3	+0.3
Independent	Brett Lucas	167	0.3	+0.3
Liberal hold		Swing	+9.1	
Liberal hold		Swing	–2.6	
Liberal gain from Labor		Swing	+4.7	
Labor hold		Swing	–7.6	
Greens hold		Swing	–3.6	

==== 2010 ====
2010 Tasmanian state election: Bass
Party	Candidate	Votes	%	±%
Quota		10,617		
Liberal	Michael Ferguson (elected 1)	15,911	25.0	+25.0
Liberal	Peter Gutwein (elected 3)	9,060	14.2	+0.7
Liberal	Michele McGinty	1,244	2.0	+2.0
Liberal	Nick Pedley	536	0.8	+0.8
Liberal	Pam Dakin	413	0.6	+0.6
Labor	Michelle O'Byrne (elected 2)	11,380	17.9	−5.4
Labor	Brian Wightman (elected 5)	3,191	5.0	+5.0
Labor	Scott McLean	3,090	4.9	+4.9
Labor	Brant Webb	2,699	4.2	+4.2
Labor	Michelle Cripps	1,627	2.6	+2.6
Greens	Kim Booth (elected 4)	8,853	13.9	+4.6
Greens	Jeremy Ball	2,226	3.5	+1.7
Greens	Peter Whish-Wilson	1,209	1.9	+1.9
Greens	Sally Day	675	1.1	+1.1
Greens	Bev Ernst	380	0.6	+0.6
Independent	Tim Parish	484	0.8	+0.8
Independent	Peter Kaye	279	0.4	+0.4
Independent	Jim Collier	162	0.3	−0.1
Independent	Mark Webb	158	0.2	+0.2
Independent	Sven Wiener	121	0.2	+0.2
Total formal votes		63,698	95.3	0.0
Informal votes		3,162	4.7	0.0
Turnout		66,860	93.8	−1.1
Party total votes
Liberal		27,164	42.6	+8.9
Labor		21,987	34.5	−15.2
Greens		13,343	21.0	+7.4
Independent	Tim Parish	484	0.8	+0.8
Independent	Peter Kaye	279	0.4	+0.4
Independent	Jim Collier	162	0.3	−0.1
Independent	Mark Webb	158	0.2	+0.2
Independent	Sven Wiener	121	0.2	+0.2

=== Elections in the 2000s ===
==== 2006 ====
2006 Tasmanian state election: Bass
Party	Candidate	Votes	%	±%
Quota		10,117		
Labor	Michelle O'Byrne (elected 1)	14,146	23.3	+23.3
Labor	Jim Cox (elected 2)	9,286	15.3	−2.2
Labor	Steve Reissig	2,755	4.5	+4.5
Labor	Grant Courtney	1,723	2.8	+2.8
Labor	Michelle Cripps	1,303	2.1	+2.1
Labor	Mike Greene	897	1.5	+1.5
Liberal	Peter Gutwein (elected 3)	8,218	13.5	+4.4
Liberal	Sue Napier (elected 4)	5,717	9.4	−1.9
Liberal	David Fry	4,274	7.0	−0.1
Liberal	Sam McQuestin	1,745	2.9	+2.9
Liberal	Pamela Fratangelo	550	0.9	+0.9
Greens	Kim Booth (elected 5)	5,653	9.3	−2.2
Greens	Jeremy Ball	1,110	1.8	+1.8
Greens	Kate Case	584	1.0	+1.0
Greens	Jill Thompson	540	0.9	+0.9
Greens	Peter Cover	344	0.6	+0.6
Independent	Les Rochester	1,178	1.9	+1.9
Tasmania First	Robert Wallace	411	0.7	−0.2
Independent	Jim Collier	265	0.4	+0.4
Total formal votes		60,699	95.3	+0.5
Informal votes		3,004	4.7	−0.5
Turnout		63,703	94.9	+1.0
Party total votes
Labor		30,110	49.6	+0.5
Liberal		20,504	33.8	+2.4
Greens		8,231	13.6	−2.9
Independent	Les Rochester	1,178	1.9	+1.9
Tasmania First		411	0.7	−0.2
Independent	Jim Collier	265	0.4	+0.4

==== 2002 ====
2002 Tasmanian state election: Bass
Party	Candidate	Votes	%	±%
Quota		9,702		
Labor	Jim Cox (elected 1)	10,252	17.5	+6.0
Labor	Kathryn Hay (elected 2)	9,918	16.9	+16.9
Labor	Anita Smith	2,885	4.9	+4.9
Labor	Geoff Lyons	2,701	4.6	+4.6
Labor	Jenni Jarvis	1,671	2.9	+2.9
Labor	Brian Roe	1,355	2.3	+2.3
Liberal	Sue Napier (elected 4)	6,656	11.4	−4.1
Liberal	Peter Gutwein (elected 5)	5,332	9.1	+9.1
Liberal	David Fry	4,158	7.1	+2.2
Liberal	Mark Baker	1,716	2.9	+2.9
Liberal	Angela Davern	510	0.9	+0.9
Greens	Kim Booth (elected 3)	6,726	11.5	+6.1
Greens	Cynthia Atherton	832	1.4	+1.4
Greens	Leyla Tas	777	1.3	+1.3
Greens	Noah Thomas	698	1.2	+1.2
Greens	David Pittaway	659	1.1	+1.1
Democrats	Vanessa Wallace	203	0.3	+0.3
Democrats	Craig Cooper	184	0.3	+0.3
Democrats	Sancia Colgrave	168	0.3	+0.3
Democrats	Renae Cooper	160	0.3	+0.3
Tasmania First	Merilyn Crack	279	0.5	−0.2
Tasmania First	Andrew Cowling	139	0.2	+0.2
Tasmania First	Joanne Durkin	111	0.2	+0.2
Independent	Dave Davis	239	0.4	+0.4
Independent	Rob Larner	141	0.2	+0.2
Socialist Alliance	Kamala Emanuel	66	0.1	+0.1
Socialist Alliance	Sonja Montaigne	32	0.1	+0.1
Total formal votes		58,568	94.8	−1.1
Informal votes		3,220	5.2	+1.1
Turnout		61,788	93.9	−0.6
Party total votes
Labor		28,782	49.1	+8.0
Liberal		18,372	31.4	−10.5
Greens		9,692	16.5	+7.4
Democrats		715	1.2	−0.4
Tasmania First		529	0.9	−4.8
Independent	Dave Davis	239	0.4	+0.4
Independent	Rob Larner	141	0.2	+0.2
Socialist Alliance		98	0.2	+0.2

=== Elections in the 1990s ===
==== 1998 ====
1998 Tasmanian state election: Bass
Party	Candidate	Votes	%	±%
Quota		9,770		
Liberal	Sue Napier (elected 1)	9,068	15.5	+4.9
Liberal	Frank Madill (elected 3)	6,646	11.3	−3.0
Liberal	Tony Benneworth	5,273	9.0	+2.9
Liberal	David Fry	2,865	4.9	−0.3
Liberal	John Temple	742	1.3	+1.3
Labor	Peter Patmore (elected 2)	7,230	12.3	+2.1
Labor	Jim Cox (elected 4)	6,741	11.5	+5.9
Labor	Gill James (elected 5)	4,976	8.5	+0.1
Labor	Helen Polley	2,782	4.7	+1.0
Labor	Noel Hodgetts	1,036	1.8	+1.8
Labor	Peter Kearney	755	1.3	+1.3
Labor	Steven Neville	579	1.0	+1.0
Greens	Kim Booth	3,160	5.4	+5.4
Greens	Louise Fairfax	797	1.4	+0.7
Greens	Samantha Kerr-Smiley	549	0.9	+0.9
Greens	Garth Faulkner	448	0.8	+0.8
Greens	Karan Jurs	372	0.6	+0.6
Tasmania First	Robert Blake	948	1.6	+1.6
Tasmania First	Louise Leslie	784	1.3	+1.3
Tasmania First	Harvey Smith	456	0.8	+0.8
Tasmania First	Merilyn Crack	405	0.7	+0.7
Tasmania First	Robert Wallace	381	0.7	+0.7
Tasmania First	Tony Bagshaw	374	0.6	+0.6
Democrats	Debbie Butler	443	0.8	+0.8
Democrats	Roberta Harkness	166	0.3	+0.3
Democrats	Rob Bensemann	134	0.2	+0.2
Democrats	Philip Tattersall	104	0.2	+0.2
Democrats	Duncan Mills	102	0.2	+0.2
Independent	Ray Slater	171	0.3	+0.3
Independent	Tim Woolnough	127	0.2	+0.2
Total formal votes		58,614	95.9	+1.6
Informal votes		2,487	4.1	−1.6
Turnout		61,101	94.5	−1.2
Party total votes
Liberal		24,594	41.9	−5.8
Labor		24,099	41.1	+2.2
Greens		5,326	9.1	−1.2
Tasmania First		3,348	5.7	+5.7
Democrats		949	1.6	+1.6
Independent	Ray Slater	171	0.3	+0.3
Independent	Tim Woolnough	127	0.2	+0.2

==== 1996 ====
1996 Tasmanian state election: Bass
Party	Candidate	Votes	%	±%
Quota		7,348		
Liberal	Frank Madill (elected 1)	8,431	14.3	−16.6
Liberal	Sue Napier (elected 2)	6,244	10.6	+7.5
Liberal	John Beswick (elected 4)	4,684	8.0	−2.2
Liberal	Tony Benneworth (elected 7)	3,608	6.1	+2.8
Liberal	David Fry	3,055	5.2	+1.5
Liberal	Peter Smith	1,398	2.4	+2.4
Liberal	Bob Andrew	591	1.0	+1.0
Labor	Peter Patmore (elected 3)	6,004	10.2	+4.3
Labor	Gill James (elected 5)	4,918	8.4	−0.8
Labor	Jim Cox (elected 6)	3,305	5.6	+1.8
Labor	Dee Potter	2,374	4.0	+4.0
Labor	Helen Polley	2,186	3.7	+3.7
Labor	Peter Daniel	1,904	3.2	+1.1
Labor	Lynda Jones	1,648	2.8	+2.8
Labor	Alan Stacey	525	0.9	+0.9
Greens	Lance Armstrong	4,413	7.5	−0.8
Greens	Louise Fairfax	417	0.7	+0.7
Greens	Elizabeth Smith	336	0.6	+0.6
Greens	Daisy Cameron	253	0.4	+0.4
Greens	David James	218	0.4	+0.4
Greens	Rodney O'Keefe	215	0.4	+0.4
Greens	David Obendorf	213	0.4	+0.4
National	Brian Boulton	476	0.8	+0.8
National	Barry Jefferies	417	0.7	+0.7
Independent	Ron Rice	507	0.9	+0.9
Extremely Greedy 40%	Peter Heading	243	0.4	+0.4
Extremely Greedy 40%	Erik Barratt-Peacock	199	0.3	+0.3
Total formal votes		58,782	94.3	−0.3
Informal votes		3,555	5.7	+0.3
Turnout		62,337	95.7	+0.3
Party total votes
Liberal		28,011	47.7	−8.8
Labor		22,864	38.9	+9.3
Greens		6,065	10.3	−1.1
National		893	1.5	+1.5
Independent	Ron Rice	507	0.9	+0.9
Extremely Greedy 40%		442	0.8	+0.8

==== 1992 ====
1992 Tasmanian state election: Bass
Party	Candidate	Votes	%	±%
Quota		6,939		
Liberal	Frank Madill (elected 1)	17,154	30.9	+13.9
Liberal	John Beswick (elected 2)	5,638	10.2	+1.8
Liberal	David Fry	2,077	3.7	+2.7
Liberal	Tony Benneworth (elected 4)	1,819	3.3	+3.3
Liberal	Sue Napier (elected 7)	1,710	3.1	+3.1
Liberal	Rod Beaumont	1,477	2.7	+2.7
Liberal	Brian Mantach	1,462	2.6	+2.6
Labor	Gill James (elected 3)	5,109	9.2	+3.6
Labor	Peter Patmore (elected 5)	3,264	5.9	−3.1
Labor	Jim Cox	2,088	3.8	−2.3
Labor	Harry Holgate	2,010	3.6	−3.2
Labor	Terry Field	1,892	3.4	+3.4
Labor	Peter Daniel	1,146	2.1	+2.1
Labor	Charles Barnard	703	1.3	+1.3
Labor	Max Brown	194	0.4	+0.4
Independent Greens	Lance Armstrong (elected 6)	4,591	8.3	−3.8
Independent Greens	Ross Barwick	497	0.9	+0.9
Independent Greens	John Chester	357	0.6	+0.6
Independent Greens	Kristina Hesketh	233	0.4	+0.4
Independent Greens	Kay Thompson	226	0.4	+0.4
Independent Greens	Marion Fry	223	0.4	+0.4
Independent Greens	Nye Evans	206	0.4	+0.4
Advance Tasmania	Robin McKendrick	714	1.3	+1.3
Advance Tasmania	Eric Petrusma	310	0.6	+0.6
Independent	Tony Le Fevre	407	0.7	+0.7
Total formal votes		55,507	94.6	+0.7
Informal votes		3,148	5.4	−0.7
Turnout		58,655	95.4	+2.6
Party total votes
Liberal		31,337	56.5	+9.2
Labor		16,406	29.6	−7.8
Independent Greens		6,333	11.4	−2.7
Advance Tasmania		1,024	1.8	+1.8
Independent	Tony Le Fevre	407	0.7	+0.7

=== Elections in the 1980s ===
==== 1989 ====
1989 Tasmanian state election: Bass
Party	Candidate	Votes	%	±%
Quota		6,740		
Liberal	Frank Madill (elected 1)	9,180	17.0	+8.4
Liberal	John Beswick (elected 6)	4,516	8.4	+1.1
Liberal	Peter Rae	4,440	8.2	−12.5
Liberal	Neil Robson (elected 7)	4,032	7.5	−1.0
Liberal	Leon Miller	1,978	3.7	+3.7
Liberal	Malcolm Carins	825	1.5	+1.5
Liberal	David Fry	533	1.0	+1.0
Labor	Peter Patmore (elected 3)	4,853	9.0	−1.2
Labor	Harry Holgate (elected 4)	3,683	6.8	−4.3
Labor	Jim Cox (elected 5)	3,288	6.1	+6.1
Labor	Gill James	3,036	5.6	−1.8
Labor	Richard Taylor	2,125	3.9	+3.9
Labor	Helen Polley	1,537	2.9	+2.9
Labor	Geoff Sweet	1,369	2.5	+2.5
Labor	John Swallow	298	0.6	+0.6
Independent Greens	Lance Armstrong (elected 2)	6,527	12.1	+12.1
Independent Greens	Patricia Ratcliff	651	1.2	+1.2
Independent Greens	John Ball	433	0.8	+0.8
Democrats	Kathy Maxwell-Petrovsky	325	0.6	−1.1
Democrats	Michelle-Ronwyn Dowlman	286	0.5	+0.5
Total formal votes		53,915	93.9	+0.5
Informal votes		3,505	6.1	−0.5
Turnout		57,240	92.8	−0.7
Party total votes
Liberal		25,504	47.3	−8.9
Labor		20,189	37.4	0.0
Independent Greens		7,611	14.1	+14.1
Democrats		611	1.1	−5.3

==== 1986 ====
1986 Tasmanian state election: Bass
Party	Candidate	Votes	%	±%
Quota		6,388		
Liberal	Peter Rae (elected 1)	10,604	20.7	+20.7
Liberal	Frank Madill (elected 4)	4,376	8.6	+8.6
Liberal	Neil Robson (elected 5)	4,322	8.4	−15.7
Liberal	John Beswick (elected 7)	3,722	7.3	+0.7
Liberal	Max Bushby	2,708	5.3	−0.7
Liberal	Brendan Lyons	1,788	3.5	−1.7
Liberal	Don Jones	1,202	2.3	+2.3
Labor	Harry Holgate (elected 2)	5,648	11.1	−2.1
Labor	Peter Patmore (elected 3)	5,205	10.2	+8.1
Labor	Gill James (elected 6)	3,775	7.4	−1.1
Labor	John McDonald	1,646	3.2	+3.2
Labor	Geoff Carr	1,321	2.6	+2.6
Labor	Wendy Carnicelli	1,125	2.2	+1.0
Labor	David Hanlon	396	0.8	+0.8
Democrats	Nick Goldie	1,890	3.7	+2.8
Democrats	Kathleen Maxwell	884	1.7	+1.7
Democrats	Michael Preece	489	1.0	+1.0
Total formal votes		51,101	93.4	−0.8
Informal votes		3,615	6.6	+0.8
Turnout		54,716	93.5	−0.4
Party total votes
Liberal		28,722	56.2	+5.9
Labor		19,116	37.4	+0.8
Democrats		3,263	6.4	+2.5

==== 1982 ====
1982 Tasmanian state election: Bass
Party	Candidate	Votes	%	±%
Quota		6,274		
Liberal	Neil Robson (elected 1)	12,103	24.1	+2.0
Liberal	John Beswick (elected 4)	3,301	6.6	+2.3
Liberal	Max Bushby (elected 5)	3,019	6.0	−0.3
Liberal	Brendan Lyons (elected 6)	2,619	5.2	+5.2
Liberal	George Brookes	2,412	4.8	−0.2
Liberal	Brian Coogan	945	1.9	+1.9
Liberal	Ivan Williams	852	1.7	+1.7
Labor	Harry Holgate (elected 2)	6,606	13.2	−6.0
Labor	Gill James (elected 3)	4,276	8.5	−2.5
Labor	Michael Barnard (elected 7)	2,946	5.9	−3.0
Labor	William Zeeman	2,572	5.1	+5.1
Labor	Peter Patmore	1,046	2.1	+2.1
Labor	Wendy Carnicelli	589	1.2	+1.2
Labor	Paul Driscoll	330	0.7	+0.7
Group C	Mary Willey	2,863	5.7	+5.7
Group C	Nigel Davies	1,363	2.7	+2.7
Group C	Dawn Rhodes	411	0.8	+0.8
Democrats	Nick Goldie	454	0.9	+0.9
Democrats	Rae Saxon	293	0.6	+0.6
Democrats	Pat Stride	275	0.5	+0.5
Democrats	Gillean Munro	267	0.5	+0.5
Democrats	Max Lubke	244	0.5	+0.5
Democrats	Joan Bell	206	0.4	+0.4
Democrats	Rick Rolls	194	0.4	+0.4
Total formal votes		50,186	94.2	−1.5
Informal votes		3,106	5.8	+1.5
Turnout		53,292	93.9	+0.4
Party total votes
Liberal		25,251	50.3	+5.6
Labor		18,365	36.6	−13.7
Group C		4,637	9.2	+9.2
Democrats		1,933	3.9	+3.9

=== Elections in the 1970s ===
==== 1979 ====
1979 Tasmanian state election: Bass
Party	Candidate	Votes	%	±%
Quota		6,046		
Labor	Harry Holgate (elected 2)	9,286	19.2	+11.2
Labor	Gill James (elected 3)	5,297	11.0	+1.9
Labor	Michael Barnard (elected 4)	4,288	8.9	−10.4
Labor	Mary Willey (elected 5)	2,874	5.9	+5.9
Labor	Mikel Powell	1,516	3.1	+3.1
Labor	Geoff Sweet	769	1.6	+1.6
Labor	Ernie Mitchell	282	0.6	+0.6
Liberal	Neil Robson (elected 1)	10,700	22.1	+15.5
Liberal	Max Bushby (elected 7)	3,036	6.3	−0.5
Liberal	George Brookes	2,405	5.0	+5.0
Liberal	John Beswick (elected 6)	2,077	4.3	−0.1
Liberal	Jim Mooney	1,925	4.0	−2.9
Liberal	Graeme Davis	744	1.5	+1.5
Liberal	Tony Stonjek	715	1.5	+1.5
Independent	Neil Pitt	2,007	4.1	+4.1
Group C	Karoly Hegedus	277	0.6	+0.6
Group C	Jim Garratt	169	0.3	+0.3
Total formal votes		48,367	95.7	−0.1
Informal votes		2,163	4.3	+0.1
Turnout		50,530	94.3	0.0
Party total votes
Labor		24,312	50.3	+1.6
Liberal		21,602	44.7	−4.5
Independent	Neil Pitt	2,007	4.1	+4.1
Group C		446	0.9	+0.9

==== 1976 ====
1976 Tasmanian state election: Bass
Party	Candidate	Votes	%	±%
Quota		5,431		
Liberal	Bill Beattie (elected 4)	3,824	8.8	−6.8
Liberal	Jim Mooney (elected 7)	3,000	6.9	+6.9
Liberal	Max Bushby (elected 5)	2,948	6.8	+1.1
Liberal	Neil Robson (elected 6)	2,870	6.6	+6.6
Liberal	Dawn Rhodes	2,109	4.9	+4.9
Liberal	Neil Pitt	2,068	4.8	−4.9
Liberal	Dick Archer	1,964	4.5	+4.5
Liberal	John Beswick	1,931	4.4	+4.4
Liberal	William Luck	646	1.5	+1.5
Labor	Michael Barnard (elected 1)	8,401	19.3	+0.6
Labor	Gill James (elected 3)	3,943	9.1	+9.1
Labor	Harry Holgate (elected 2)	3,471	8.0	+3.6
Labor	David Farquhar	1,533	3.5	−0.7
Labor	Ursula Workman	1,373	3.6	+3.6
Labor	Thomas O'Byrne	1,193	2.7	+2.7
Labor	John Breen	869	2.0	+2.0
Labor	Myron Tripp	397	0.9	+0.9
United Tasmania	Bob Brown	414	1.0	+1.0
United Tasmania	Deidre Smith	255	0.6	+0.6
United Tasmania	Noreen Batchelor	95	0.2	+0.2
Independent	Quentin Wilson	143	0.3	+0.3
Total formal votes		43,447	95.8	−0.2
Informal votes		1,886	4.2	+0.2
Turnout		45,333	94.3	−0.5
Party total votes
Liberal		21,360	49.2	+6.3
Labor		21,180	48.7	−0.6
United Tasmania		764	1.8	−0.2
Independent	Quentin Wilson	143	0.3	+0.3

==== 1972 ====
1972 Tasmanian state election: Bass
Party	Candidate	Votes	%	±%
Quota		4,707		
Labor	Michael Barnard (elected 1)	7,051	18.7	+6.8
Labor	Allan Foster (elected 3)	4,558	12.1	+0.4
Labor	Mac Le Fevre (elected 6)	1,819	4.8	+0.6
Labor	Harry Holgate	1,654	4.4	+4.4
Labor	David Farquhar (elected 5)	1,580	4.2	+4.2
Labor	Laurence Lovett	740	2.0	−0.9
Labor	Jean Hearn	712	1.9	+1.9
Labor	Sheila Ryan	436	1.2	+1.2
Liberal	Bill Beattie (elected 2)	5,861	15.6	+3.7
Liberal	Neil Pitt (elected 4)	3,651	9.7	+9.7
Liberal	Max Bushby (elected 7)	2,136	5.7	−5.9
Liberal	Timothy Barrenger	2,068	5.5	−3.2
Liberal	James Henty	1,596	4.2	−2.1
Liberal	Henry Bertram	644	1.7	−1.7
Liberal	James Child	194	0.5	+0.5
Independent	Jim Mooney	1,688	4.5	+4.5
United Tasmania	Walter Austin	355	0.9	+0.9
United Tasmania	Jeffrey Weston	246	0.7	+0.7
United Tasmania	Julia Weston	166	0.4	+0.4
Independent	Pasqualino Santamaria	444	1.2	+1.2
Independent	John Carter	49	0.1	+0.1
Total formal votes		37,648	96.0	+0.7
Informal votes		1,552	4.0	−0.7
Turnout		39,200	94.8	+1.2
Party total votes
Labor		18,550	49.3	+6.9
Liberal		16,150	42.9	−3.3
Independent	Jim Mooney	1,688	4.5	+4.5
United Tasmania		767	2.0	+2.0
Independent	Pasqualino Santamaria	444	1.2	+1.2
Independent	John Carter	49	0.1	+0.1

=== Elections in the 1960s ===
==== 1969 ====
1969 Tasmanian state election: Bass
Party	Candidate	Votes	%	±%
Quota		4,581		
Liberal	Bill Beattie (elected 3)	4,361	11.9	+1.0
Liberal	Max Bushby (elected 2)	4,246	11.6	+3.5
Liberal	Timothy Barrenger (elected 5)	3,195	8.7	+8.7
Liberal	James Henty (elected 6)	2,294	6.3	+2.4
Liberal	Henry Bertram	1,256	3.4	+3.4
Liberal	Norman Tilley	804	2.2	+2.2
Liberal	Don Gilmour	763	2.1	+2.1
Labor	Michael Barnard (elected 1)	4,376	11.9	+11.9
Labor	Allan Foster (elected 4)	4,270	11.7	+11.7
Labor	Alexander Atkins (elected 7)	2,041	5.6	−6.1
Labor	Mac Le Fevre	1,538	4.2	−5.8
Labor	Laurence Lovett	1,077	2.9	−0.7
Labor	John Madden	892	2.4	−8.1
Labor	Eric Down	798	2.2	−0.4
Labor	Wallace Fraser	561	1.5	−3.8
Centre	Bruce Kekwick	1,034	2.8	+2.8
Centre	Jeffrey Weston	544	1.5	+1.5
Centre	Edward Smith	56	0.2	+0.2
Independent	Neil Pitt	1,087	3.0	+3.0
Group A	Leslie Arnold	386	1.1	+0.2
Group A	George Brookes	340	0.9	+0.9
Democratic Labor	Peter Ferrall	385	1.1	+1.1
Democratic Labor	Eris Smyth	338	0.9	+0.9
Total formal votes		36,642	95.3	+0.3
Informal votes		1,815	4.7	−0.3
Turnout		38,457	93.6	−1.7
Party total votes
Liberal		16,919	46.2	+5.0
Labor		15,553	42.4	−7.5
Centre		1,634	4.5	+4.5
Independent	Neil Pitt	1,087	3.0	+3.0
Group A		726	2.0	+0.6
Democratic Labor		723	2.0	0.0

==== 1964 ====
1964 Tasmanian state election: Bass
Party	Candidate	Votes	%	±%
Quota		4,383		
Labor	Alexander Atkins (elected 2)	4,104	11.7	+4.0
Labor	John Madden (elected 4)	3,667	10.5	+1.1
Labor	Mac Le Fevre (elected 3)	3,514	10.0	+5.5
Labor	Wallace Fraser (elected 7)	1,872	5.3	+3.3
Labor	Laurence Lovett	1,273	3.6	+3.6
Labor	Norman Laurence	1,145	3.3	+3.3
Labor	Harold Holmes	1,013	2.9	+2.9
Labor	Eric Down	899	2.6	+2.6
Liberal	Bill Beattie (elected 1)	3,807	10.9	+2.8
Liberal	John Steer (elected 6)	3,119	8.9	+0.9
Liberal	Max Bushby (elected 5)	2,825	8.1	+3.2
Liberal	James McGowen	1,453	4.1	−1.6
Liberal	James Henty	1,375	3.9	+3.9
Liberal	Stewart Chapple	1,243	3.5	+3.5
Liberal	Jack Hookway	544	1.6	+1.6
Liberal	Kevin Hendstock	93	0.3	+0.3
Country	Geoffrey Finney	637	1.8	+1.8
Country	Keith Darcey	620	1.8	+1.8
Country	Colin Rattray	496	1.4	+1.4
Country	Graeme Millar	141	0.4	+0.4
Democratic Labor	Edward Hare	440	1.3	+1.3
Democratic Labor	Frederick Kaye	244	0.7	+0.7
Group A	Leslie Arnold	301	0.9	−2.6
Group A	Jack Harper	178	0.5	+0.5
Independent	Brian Johnson	57	0.2	+0.2
Total formal votes		35,060	95.0	+1.5
Informal votes		1,837	5.0	−1.5
Turnout		36,897	95.3	+0.3
Party total votes
Labor		17,487	49.9	+18.3
Liberal		14,459	41.2	+4.9
Country		1,894	5.4	+5.4
Democratic Labor		684	2.0	+2.0
Group A		479	1.4	−2.1
Independent	Brian Johnson	57	0.2	+0.2

=== Elections in the 1950s ===
==== 1959 ====
1959 Tasmanian state election: Bass
Party	Candidate	Votes	%	±%
Quota		4,057		
Liberal	Bill Beattie (elected 4)	2,621	8.1	−5.1
Liberal	John Steer (elected 6)	2,603	8.0	−1.9
Liberal	Fred Marriott (elected 7)	2,444	7.5	−2.8
Liberal	James McGowen	1,855	5.7	+5.7
Liberal	Max Bushby	1,578	4.9	+4.9
Liberal	Lionel Abbott	555	1.7	+1.7
Liberal	Harold Pope	119	0.4	+0.4
Labor	John Madden (elected 2)	3,056	9.4	+1.8
Labor	Alexander Atkins (elected 3)	2,497	7.7	−2.3
Labor	Harold Newman	1,493	4.6	+4.6
Labor	Mac Le Fevre (elected 5)	1,469	4.5	+4.5
Labor	Frank Taylor	1,100	3.4	+3.4
Labor	Wallace Fraser	642	2.0	+0.8
Group B	Reg Turnbull (elected 1)	9,065	27.9	+27.9
Group B	William Shipp	205	0.6	+0.6
Democratic Labor	Leslie Arnold	1,149	3.5	+3.5
Total formal votes		32,451	93.5	−1.8
Informal votes		2,256	6.5	+1.8
Turnout		34,707	95.0	0.0
Party total votes
Liberal		11,775	36.3	−8.2
Labor		10,257	31.6	−19.9
Group B		9,270	28.6	+28.6
Democratic Labor		1,149	3.5	−0.5

==== 1956 ====
1956 Tasmanian state election: Bass
Party	Candidate	Votes	%	±%
Quota		4,593		
Labor	Claude Barnard (elected 1)	5,159	16.0	+2.0
Labor	Reg Turnbull (elected 2)	4,570	14.2	+3.5
Labor	Alexander Atkins (elected 6)	3,209	10.0	+1.2
Labor	John Madden	2,445	7.6	−4.3
Labor	Ronald Cocker	783	2.4	+2.4
Labor	Wallace Fraser	390	1.2	−1.5
Liberal	Bill Beattie (elected 3)	4,252	13.2	+2.5
Liberal	Fred Marriott (elected 4)	3,326	10.3	+0.7
Liberal	John Steer (elected 5)	3,177	9.9	−2.1
Liberal	William Fry	2,906	9.0	+2.0
Liberal	Ralph Fleming	631	2.0	+2.0
Labor (A-C)	Virgil Morgan	1,228	3.8	+3.8
Labor (A-C)	Clement Pollington	73	0.2	+0.2
Total formal votes		32,149	95.3	−0.6
Informal votes		1,569	4.7	+0.6
Turnout		33,718	95.0	+1.1
Party total votes
Labor		16,556	51.5	−2.0
Liberal		14,292	44.5	−1.5
Labor (A-C)		1,301	4.0	+4.0

==== 1955 ====
1955 Tasmanian state election: Bass
Party	Candidate	Votes	%	±%
Quota		4,372		
Labor	Claude Barnard (elected 1)	4,281	14.0	+4.5
Labor	John Madden (elected 2)	3,635	11.9	−1.8
Labor	Reg Turnbull (elected 6)	3,287	10.7	−2.1
Labor	Alexander Atkins	2,699	8.8	+2.7
Labor	Henry McGee	1,626	5.3	+5.3
Labor	Wallace Fraser	836	2.7	+2.7
Liberal	John Steer (elected 3)	3,686	12.0	+0.5
Liberal	Bill Beattie (elected 5)	3,266	10.7	+1.5
Liberal	Fred Marriott (elected 4)	2,949	9.6	+0.4
Liberal	William Fry	2,155	7.0	+7.0
Liberal	James McGowen	1,225	4.0	+1.6
Liberal	Jean Law	793	2.6	+2.6
Independent	Norton Delanty	160	0.5	+0.5
Total formal votes		30,598	95.9	−0.2
Informal votes		1,295	4.1	+0.2
Turnout		31,893	93.9	−1.0
Party total votes
Labor		16,364	53.5	−0.7
Liberal		14,074	46.0	+0.2
Independent	Norton Delanty	160	0.5	+0.5

==== 1950 ====
1950 Tasmanian state election: Bass
Party	Candidate	Votes	%	±%
Quota		4,289		
Labor	John Madden (elected 1)	4,103	13.7	−3.1
Labor	Reg Turnbull (elected 2)	3,855	12.8	−2.0
Labor	Claude Barnard (elected 3)	2,847	9.5	+9.5
Labor	William Oliver	1,897	6.3	+6.3
Labor	Alexander Atkins	1,817	6.1	0.0
Labor	Eric Howroyd	1,752	5.8	−2.8
Liberal	John Steer (elected 5)	3,458	11.5	+3.7
Liberal	John Orchard (elected 6)	3,189	10.6	+2.2
Liberal	Bill Beattie	2,774	9.2	+1.6
Liberal	Fred Marriott (elected 4)	2,752	9.2	−2.9
Liberal	James Guy	852	2.8	+2.8
Liberal	James McGowen	726	2.4	+2.4
Total formal votes		30,022	96.1	−0.7
Informal votes		1,211	3.9	+0.7
Turnout		31,233	94.9	+5.1
Party total votes
Labor		14,937	54.2	−1.7
Liberal		13,751	45.8	+1.7

=== Elections in the 1940s ===
==== 1948 ====
1948 Tasmanian state election: Bass
Party	Candidate	Votes	%	±%
Quota		3,819		
Labor	John Madden (elected 1)	4,501	16.8	+1.2
Labor	Reg Turnbull (elected 2)	3,953	14.8	−1.4
Labor	Eric Howroyd (elected 4)	2,286	8.6	−0.1
Labor	Alexander Atkins	1,632	6.1	+0.3
Labor	John Carter	1,625	6.1	+1.3
Labor	Henry Hurst	940	3.5	+3.5
Liberal	Fred Marriott (elected 3)	3,225	12.1	+4.0
Liberal	John Orchard (elected 6)	2,249	8.4	+8.4
Liberal	John Steer	2,083	7.8	+7.8
Liberal	Bill Beattie (elected 5)	2,074	7.8	+0.5
Liberal	Jack Breheny	1,068	4.0	+4.0
Liberal	Allen Hollingsworth	917	3.4	−2.4
Liberal	Stewart Chapple	178	0.7	+0.7
Total formal votes		26,731	96.8	+7.7
Informal votes		888	3.2	−7.7
Turnout		27,619	89.8	−1.1
Party total votes
Labor		14,937	55.9	−2.0
Liberal		11,794	44.1	+12.2

==== 1946 ====
1946 Tasmanian state election: Bass
Party	Candidate	Votes	%	±%
Quota		3,453		
Labor	Reg Turnbull (elected 1)	3,918	16.2	+16.2
Labor	John Madden (elected 2)	3,767	15.6	+3.4
Labor	Eric Howroyd (elected 3)	2,107	8.7	+0.6
Labor	Alexander Atkins (elected 4)	1,400	5.8	+5.8
Labor	John Carter	1,161	4.8	+4.8
Labor	Henry McGee	578	2.4	+2.4
Labor	John Quintal	570	2.4	−0.9
Labor	Alan Welsh	495	2.0	−1.3
Liberal	Fred Marriott (elected 5)	1,949	8.1	+8.1
Liberal	Bill Beattie (elected 6)	1,767	7.3	+7.3
Liberal	Allen Hollingsworth	1,392	5.8	−0.7
Liberal	William Brice	1,023	4.2	+4.2
Liberal	Sinclair Thyne	924	3.8	+3.8
Liberal	Ernest Pitchford	656	2.7	−0.8
Independent	John Ockerby	1,174	4.9	+4.9
Independent	Ern Pinkard	982	4.1	+4.1
Independent	Eugene Sullivan	304	1.3	+1.3
Total formal votes		24,167	89.1	−4.7
Informal votes		2,967	10.9	+4.7
Turnout		27,134	90.9	−0.2
Party total votes
Labor		13,996	57.9	−6.3
Liberal		7,711	31.9	−3.8
Independent	John Ockerby	1,174	4.9	+4.9
Independent	Ern Pinkard	982	4.1	+4.1
Independent	Eugene Sullivan	304	1.3	+1.3

==== 1941 ====
1941 Tasmanian state election: Bass
Party	Candidate	Votes	%	±%
Quota		3,234		
Labor	Thomas Davies (elected 1)	6,220	27.5	−3.2
Labor	John Madden (elected 2)	2,753	12.2	+2.1
Labor	John McDonald (elected 4)	2,253	10.0	+0.9
Labor	Eric Howroyd (elected 3)	1,829	8.1	+2.2
Labor	Alan Welsh	745	3.3	+3.3
Labor	John Quintal	742	3.3	+3.3
Nationalist	John Ockerby (elected 5)	2,540	11.2	−0.7
Nationalist	Frank Marriott (elected 6)	1,737	7.7	+7.7
Nationalist	Desmond Oldham	1,556	6.9	+0.6
Nationalist	Allen Hollingsworth	1,471	6.5	+0.2
Nationalist	Ernest Pitchford	786	3.5	+3.5
Total formal votes		22,632	93.8	−3.9
Informal votes		1,487	6.2	+3.9
Turnout		24,119	91.1	−2.7
Party total votes
Labor		14,542	64.2	+1.1
Nationalist		8,090	35.7	+1.4

=== Elections in the 1930s ===
==== 1937 ====
1937 Tasmanian state election: Bass
Party	Candidate	Votes	%	±%
Quota		3,418		
Labor	Thomas Davies (elected 1)	7,344	30.7	+9.4
Labor	John Madden (elected 2)	2,426	10.1	+5.5
Labor	John McDonald (elected 4)	2,174	9.1	+3.6
Labor	Eric Howroyd (elected 5)	1,410	5.9	+5.9
Labor	George McElwee	1,080	4.5	+4.5
Labor	Peter Pike	671	2.8	+2.8
Nationalist	John Ockerby (elected 3)	2,836	11.9	+4.7
Nationalist	Angus McKenzie	1,639	6.9	+6.9
Nationalist	Allen Hollingsworth (elected 6)	1,501	6.3	−7.1
Nationalist	Syd Jackson	1,340	5.6	−0.2
Nationalist	Harold Solomon	888	3.7	+3.7
Independent	Percy Harvey	529	2.2	+2.2
Independent	John Sheehan	82	0.3	+0.3
Total formal votes		23,920	97.7	+1.1
Informal votes		570	2.3	−1.1
Turnout		24,490	93.8	−0.8
Party total votes
Labor		15,105	63.1	+12.3
Nationalist		8,204	34.3	−14.9
Independent	Percy Harvey	529	2.2	+2.2
Independent	John Sheehan	82	0.3	+0.3

==== 1934 ====
1934 Tasmanian state election: Bass
Party	Candidate	Votes	%	±%
Quota		3,335		
Labor	Thomas Davies (elected 1)	4,982	21.3	+10.5
Labor	Victor Shaw (elected 2)	2,867	12.3	−1.8
Labor	John Joseph McDonald (elected 6)	1,313	5.6	+5.6
Labor	Charles Lamp	1,270	5.4	+5.4
Labor	Frederick Hall	355	1.5	+1.5
Nationalist	Allen Hollingsworth (elected 3)	3,138	13.4	+13.4
Nationalist	Claude James (elected 4)	2,217	9.5	−0.4
Nationalist	Robert Murphy	1,812	7.8	−6.0
Nationalist	John Ockerby (elected 5)	1,671	7.2	−0.6
Nationalist	Syd Jackson	1,346	5.8	+5.8
Nationalist	Herbert Postle	825	3.5	−1.8
Nationalist	Henry Thomson	650	2.8	−3.2
Nationalist	Robert Wright	324	1.4	+1.4
Total formal votes		23,339	96.6	0.0
Informal votes		831	3.4	0.0
Turnout		24,170	94.6	−0.1
Party total votes
Labor		11,856	50.8	+13.6
Nationalist		11,483	49.2	−13.6

==== 1931 ====
1931 Tasmanian state election: Bass
Party	Candidate	Votes	%	±%
Quota		3,095		
Nationalist	Howard Barber (elected 1)	3,446	15.9	+15.9
Nationalist	Robert Murphy (elected 2)	2,989	13.8	+6.9
Nationalist	Claude James (elected 4)	2,155	9.9	−0.3
Nationalist	John Ockerby (elected 6)	1,684	7.8	−2.4
Nationalist	Henry Thomson	1,302	6.0	−1.5
Nationalist	Herbert Postle	1,145	5.3	+5.3
Nationalist	Benjamin Saunders	882	4.1	+4.1
Labor	Victor Shaw (elected 3)	3,064	14.1	+4.8
Labor	Thomas Davies (elected 5)	2,342	10.8	+3.8
Labor	George Becker	1,688	7.8	−5.1
Labor	Alfred Higgins	964	4.5	+1.3
Total formal votes		21,661	96.6	0.0
Informal votes		768	3.4	0.0
Turnout		22,429	94.7	+15.0
Party total votes
Nationalist		13,603	62.8	+17.4
Labor		8,058	37.2	−17.4

=== Elections in the 1920s ===
==== 1928 ====
1928 Tasmanian state election: Bass
Party	Candidate	Votes	%	±%
Quota		2,452		
Labor	Allan Guy (elected 1)	2,963	17.3	−4.2
Labor	George Becker (elected 2)	2,210	12.9	+1.7
Labor	Victor Shaw (elected 3)	2,088	12.2	+3.7
Labor	Thomas Davies	1,201	7.0	+7.0
Labor	Alfred Higgins	549	3.2	+3.2
Labor	Harold Holmes	357	2.1	−0.8
Nationalist	John Ockerby (elected 5)	1,749	10.2	+10.2
Nationalist	Claude James (elected 4)	1,745	10.2	−3.2
Nationalist	Henry Thomson (elected 6)	1,284	7.5	+0.6
Nationalist	Robert Murphy	1,183	6.9	+2.9
Nationalist	William Salisbury	805	4.7	+4.7
Nationalist	Harold Brumby	454	2.6	+2.6
Nationalist	James Lefevre	431	2.5	+2.5
Nationalist	John Kidd	144	0.8	+0.8
Total formal votes		17,163	96.6	−1.6
Informal votes		601	3.4	+1.6
Turnout		17,764	79.7	+11.7
Party total votes
Labor		9,368	54.6	+10.6
Nationalist		7,795	45.4	+30.2

==== 1925 ====
1925 Tasmanian state election: Bass
Party	Candidate	Votes	%	±%
Quota		2,133		
Labor	Allan Guy (elected 1)	3,206	21.5	+7.7
Labor	George Becker (elected 2)	1,665	11.2	−1.8
Labor	Victor Shaw (elected 5)	1,269	8.5	+3.2
Labor	Harold Holmes	428	2.9	+2.9
Liberal	Claude James (elected 3)	2,008	13.4	+13.4
Liberal	James Newton (elected 4)	1,286	8.6	−3.0
Liberal	Leslie Procter	633	4.2	+4.2
Liberal	Robert Coplestone	202	1.4	+1.4
Liberal	William Rose	159	1.1	+1.1
Liberal	Luke Bryant	42	0.3	+0.3
Nationalist	Henry Thomson (elected 6)	1,032	6.9	−1.2
Nationalist	Robert Murphy	597	4.0	−2.1
Nationalist	George Pullen	289	1.9	+1.9
Nationalist	George Shields	286	1.9	+1.9
Nationalist	James Sullivan	61	0.4	+0.4
Independent Labor	Jens Jensen	1,319	8.8	+0.5
Independent	Alexander Marshall	448	3.0	−5.4
Total formal votes		14,930	98.2	+0.3
Informal votes		277	1.8	−0.3
Turnout		15,207	68.0	+6.7
Party total votes
Labor		6,568	44.0	+4.5
Liberal		4,330	29.0	+29.0
Nationalist		2,265	15.2	−30.9
Independent Labor	Jens Jensen	1,319	8.8	+0.5
Independent	Alexander Marshall	448	3.0	+3.0

==== 1922 ====
1922 Tasmanian state election: Bass
Party	Candidate	Votes	%	±%
Quota		2,003		
Nationalist	John Hayes (elected 3)	1,783	12.7	−3.6
Nationalist	John Newton (elected 4)	1,631	11.6	−5.7
Nationalist	Alexander Marshall (elected 5)	1,173	8.4	−8.3
Nationalist	Henry Thomson	1,134	8.1	+8.1
Nationalist	George Shields	687	4.9	+4.9
Nationalist	William Rose	50	0.4	+0.4
Labor	Allan Guy (elected 1)	1,941	13.8	+4.5
Labor	George Becker (elected 2)	1,820	13.0	−1.5
Labor	Victor Shaw	749	5.3	−1.4
Labor	Alfred Higgins	670	4.8	+4.8
Labor	Leonard Bennett	364	2.6	+2.6
Independent	Jens Jensen (elected 6)	1,158	8.3	+8.3
Country	Robert Murphy	859	6.1	+6.1
Total formal votes		14,019	97.9	+1.2
Informal votes		294	2.1	−1.2
Turnout		14,313	61.3	−1.9
Party total votes
Nationalist		6,458	46.1	−16.0
Labor		5,544	39.5	+1.6
Independent	Jens Jensen	1,158	8.3	+8.3
Country		859	6.1	+6.1

=== Elections in the 1910s ===
==== 1919 ====
1919 Tasmanian state election: Bass
Party	Candidate	Votes	%	±%
Quota		1,954		
Nationalist	James Newton (elected 1)	2,367	17.3	+11.8
Nationalist	Alexander Marshall (elected 2)	2,280	16.7	−3.0
Nationalist	John Hayes (elected 3)	2,233	16.3	+5.7
Nationalist	Robert Sadler (elected 5)	1,610	11.8	+2.8
Labor	George Becker (elected 4)	1,986	14.5	−1.3
Labor	Allan Guy (elected 6)	1,297	9.5	0.0
Labor	Victor Shaw	915	6.7	+6.7
Labor	William Bowen	535	3.9	+3.9
Labor	Henry Sharpe	449	3.3	+3.3
Total formal votes		13,672	96.7	+1.0
Informal votes		471	3.3	−1.0
Turnout		14,143	63.2	−8.5
Party total votes
Nationalist		8,490	62.1	+16.8
Labor		5,182	37.9	−15.3

==== 1916 ====
1916 Tasmanian state election: Bass
Party	Candidate	Votes	%	±%
Quota		2,250		
Labor	George Becker (elected 2)	2,480	15.8	+1.0
Labor	Charles Howroyd (elected 3)	2,199	14.0	+1.0
Labor	Allan Guy (elected 6)	1,495	9.5	+1.3
Labor	James McDonald	1,239	7.9	+7.9
Labor	William Sheehan	970	6.2	+6.2
Liberal	Alexander Marshall (elected 1)	3,101	19.7	+19.7
Liberal	John Hayes (elected 4)	1,663	10.6	−1.3
Liberal	Robert Sadler (elected 5)	1,501	9.5	+1.3
Liberal	James Newton	869	5.5	+5.5
Independent	Richard Russell	229	1.5	+1.5
Total formal votes		15,746	95.7	−1.8
Informal votes		716	4.3	+1.8
Turnout		16,462	71.7	+5.0
Party total votes
Labor		8,383	53.2	+2.9
Liberal		7,134	45.3	−4.4
Independent	Richard Russell	229	1.5	+1.5

==== 1913 ====
1913 Tasmanian state election: Bass
Party	Candidate	Votes	%	±%
Quota		1,968		
Labor	George Becker (elected 2)	2,039	14.8	+5.9
Labor	Arthur Anderson (elected 3)	1,974	14.3	+14.3
Labor	Charles Howroyd (elected 4)	1,788	13.0	−6.0
Labor	Allan Guy	1,131	8.2	−1.0
Liberal	Albert Solomon (elected 1)	2,909	21.1	+2.1
Liberal	John Hayes (elected 5)	1,643	11.9	+11.9
Liberal	Richard McKenzie	1,157	8.4	+1.7
Liberal	Robert Sadler (elected 6)	1,130	8.2	+1.3
Total formal votes		13,771	97.5	+0.1
Informal votes		351	2.5	−0.1
Turnout		14,122	66.7	−5.1
Party total votes
Labor		6,932	50.3	+1.4
Liberal		6,839	49.7	−1.4
