= Results of the 1928 Tasmanian state election =

List of house of assembly results for the 1928 Tasmanian elections

Tasmanian state election, 30 May 1928 House of Assembly << 1925–1931 >>
Enrolled voters	111,956				
Votes cast	91,679		Turnout	81.89%	+14.63%
Informal votes	2,973		Informal	3.24%	+1.02%
Summary of votes by party
Party	Primary votes	%	Swing	Seats	Change
Labor	41,829	47.15%	–1.32%	14	– 2
Nationalist^{[1]}	37,432	42.20%	+2.83%	15	+ 4
Independent Labor TAS	1,982	2.23%	–1.22%	0	± 0
Independent	7,461	8.41%	–0.30%	1	– 2
Total	88,706			30	

This is a list of House of Assembly results for the 1928 Tasmanian election.

== Results by division ==
=== Bass ===
1928 Tasmanian state election: Bass
Party	Candidate	Votes	%	±%
Quota		2,452		
Labor	Allan Guy (elected 1)	2,963	17.3	−4.2
Labor	George Becker (elected 2)	2,210	12.9	+1.7
Labor	Victor Shaw (elected 3)	2,088	12.2	+3.7
Labor	Thomas Davies	1,201	7.0	+7.0
Labor	Alfred Higgins	549	3.2	+3.2
Labor	Harold Holmes	357	2.1	−0.8
Nationalist	John Ockerby (elected 5)	1,749	10.2	+10.2
Nationalist	Claude James (elected 4)	1,745	10.2	−3.2
Nationalist	Henry Thomson (elected 6)	1,284	7.5	+0.6
Nationalist	Robert Murphy	1,183	6.9	+2.9
Nationalist	William Salisbury	805	4.7	+4.7
Nationalist	Harold Brumby	454	2.6	+2.6
Nationalist	James Lefevre	431	2.5	+2.5
Nationalist	John Kidd	144	0.8	+0.8
Total formal votes		17,163	96.6	−1.6
Informal votes		601	3.4	+1.6
Turnout		17,764	79.7	+11.7
Party total votes
Labor		9,368	54.6	+10.6
Nationalist		7,795	45.4	+30.2

=== Darwin ===
1928 Tasmanian state election: Darwin
Party	Candidate	Votes	%	±%
Quota		2,678		
Labor	Philip Kelly (elected 2)	2,805	15.0	−16.3
Labor	James Belton (elected 3)	2,477	13.2	−4.4
Labor	Fergus Medwin (elected 6)	1,171	6.2	+6.2
Labor	Henry Lane	954	5.1	+0.2
Labor	Robert Steel	677	3.6	+3.6
Labor	John O'Donnell	674	3.6	+3.6
Nationalist	Frank Marriott (elected 1)	3,266	17.4	+5.7
Nationalist	Edward Hobbs (elected 4)	2,041	10.9	+2.3
Nationalist	Henry McFie (elected 5)	1,703	9.1	−0.5
Nationalist	Richard Parsons	785	4.2	+4.2
Nationalist	Duncan McInnes	779	4.2	+4.2
Independent	Joshua Whitsitt	1,413	7.5	+7.5
Total formal votes		18,745	96.8	−0.7
Informal votes		628	3.2	+0.7
Turnout		19,373	84.2	+13.7
Party total votes
Labor		8,758	46.7	+4.8
Nationalist		8,574	45.7	+10.1
Independent	Joshua Whitsitt	1,413	7.5	+7.5

=== Denison ===
1928 Tasmanian state election: Denison
Party	Candidate	Votes	%	±%
Quota		2,634		
Labor	Walter Woods (elected 4)	1,493	8.1	−0.8
Labor	Edmund Dwyer-Gray (elected 6)	1,461	7.9	+7.9
Labor	Robert Cosgrove (elected 5)	1,285	7.0	−2.7
Labor	John Brown	977	5.3	+5.3
Labor	Charles Culley	939	5.1	−5.9
Labor	John Cleary	595	3.2	−4.1
Labor	William Lloyd	502	2.7	+2.7
Labor	George Phillips	293	1.6	+1.6
Nationalist	John McPhee (elected 1)	2,872	15.6	+7.0
Nationalist	Charles Grant (elected 2)	1,774	9.6	+0.5
Nationalist	John Soundy (elected 3)	1,423	7.7	−4.2
Nationalist	Horace Walch	1,258	6.8	+6.8
Nationalist	George Davis	121	0.7	+0.7
Independent Labor	Gerald Mahoney	1,982	10.8	+3.1
Independent	William McHugo	1,057	5.7	+5.7
Independent	Richard Stamford	223	1.2	+1.2
Independent	John Graham	176	1.0	+1.0
Total formal votes		18,431	97.3	−0.6
Informal votes		519	2.7	+0.6
Turnout		18,950	83.6	+14.6
Party total votes
Labor		7,545	40.9	−8.5
Nationalist		7,448	40.4	−0.3
Independent Labor	Gerald Mahoney	1,982	10.8	+3.1
Independent	William McHugo	1,057	5.7	+5.7
Independent	Richard Stamford	223	1.2	+1.2
Independent	John Graham	176	1.0	+1.0

=== Franklin ===
14668

1928 Tasmanian state election: Franklin
Party	Candidate	Votes	%	±%
Quota		2,589		
Labor	Albert Ogilvie (elected 1)	4,570	25.2	−3.0
Labor	Benjamin Watkins (elected 3)	1,231	6.8	+1.6
Labor	William Sheridan	489	2.7	−4.1
Labor	Charles Frost	417	2.3	+2.3
Labor	John Hohne	377	2.1	+2.1
Labor	Samuel Lyden	372	2.1	+2.1
Labor	Will Reece	286	1.6	+1.6
Labor	William Michael	144	0.8	+0.8
Nationalist	John Piggott (elected 2)	2,564	14.2	+6.7
Nationalist	Henry Baker (elected 5)	1,833	10.1	+10.1
Nationalist	John Evans (elected 4)	1,606	8.9	−6.0
Nationalist	George Cummins	780	4.3	−4.4
Independent	Benjamin Pearsall (elected 6)	1,391	7.7	+0.4
Independent	Peter Murdoch	1,043	5.8	−2.9
Independent	John Earle	910	5.0	+5.0
Independent	Winston Triffitt	106	0.6	+0.6
Total formal votes		18,119	97.2	−1.0
Informal votes		527	2.8	+1.0
Turnout		18,646	81.2	+17.3
Party total votes
Labor		7,886	43.5	−7.4
Nationalist		6,783	37.4	+11.8
Independent	Benjamin Pearsall	1,391	7.7	+0.4
Independent	Peter Murdoch	1,043	5.8	−2.9
Independent	John Earle	910	5.0	+5.0
Independent	Winston Triffitt	106	0.6	+0.6

=== Wilmot ===
1928 Tasmanian state election: Wilmot
Party	Candidate	Votes	%	±%
Quota		2,322		
Labor	Joseph Lyons (elected 1)	4,709	29.0	−1.6
Labor	Jens Jensen (elected 5)	1,027	6.3	+6.3
Labor	Herbert Osborne	781	4.8	+2.4
Labor	Leonard Bennett	673	4.1	+4.1
Labor	Eric Ogilvie (elected 6)	661	4.1	+4.1
Labor	William Shoobridge	282	1.7	−0.4
Labor	John Palamountain	141	0.9	−0.6
Nationalist	Walter Lee (elected 2)	2,394	14.7	+4.9
Nationalist	Neil Campbell (elected 3)	2,374	14.6	+3.5
Nationalist	Percy Best (elected 4)	1,911	11.8	+5.7
Nationalist	George Rowell	153	0.9	+0.9
Independent	Norman Cameron	723	4.4	−6.8
Independent	Walter McShane	419	2.6	+2.6
Total formal votes		16,248	95.9	−1.7
Informal votes		698	4.1	+1.7
Turnout		16,946	80.6	+16.0
Party total votes
Labor		8,274	50.9	+4.8
Nationalist		6,832	42.0	+15.3
Independent	Norman Cameron	723	4.4	−6.8
Independent	Walter McShane	419	2.6	+2.6

== See also ==
- 1928 Tasmanian state election
- Members of the Tasmanian House of Assembly, 1928–1931
- Candidates of the 1928 Tasmanian state election
