= Candidates of the 1931 Tasmanian state election =

The 1931 Tasmanian state election was held on 9 May 1931.

== Retiring Members ==
No MHAs retired at this election.

== House of Assembly ==
Sitting members are shown in bold text. Tickets that elected at least one MHA are highlighted in the relevant colour. Successful candidates are indicated by an asterisk (*).

=== Bass ===
Six seats were up for election. The Labor Party was defending three seats. The Nationalist Party was defending three seats.

Labor candidates	Nationalist candidates
**George Becker**; **Thomas Davies***; Alfred Higgins; **Victor Shaw***	Howard Barber*; **Claude James***; Robert Murphy*; **John Ockerby***; Herbert Postle; Benjamin Saunders; **Henry Thomson**

=== Darwin ===
Six seats were up for election. The Labor Party was defending three seats, although Labor MHA Fergus Medwin was running as an independent. The Nationalist Party was defending three seats.

Labor candidates	Nationalist candidates	Independent candidates
**James Belton**; Thomas d'Alton*; James Gray; **Philip Kelly***; Joseph McGrath	Thomas Butler*; **Edward Hobbs***; **Henry McFie***; **Frank Marriott***; Colin Paul; John Wright	Daniel Brown; **Fergus Medwin**

=== Denison ===
Six seats were up for election. The Labor Party was defending three seats. The Nationalist Party was defending three seats.

Labor candidates	Nationalist candidates	Independent candidates
Frederick Bates; John Cleary; **Robert Cosgrove**; **Edmund Dwyer-Gray***; Gerald Mahoney*; Arthur Tyler; **Walter Woods**	George Gilmore; **Charles Grant***; Arndell Lewis; **John McPhee***; Charles O'Conor; Alfred Richardson; **John Soundy***; Maurice Susman; Ernest Turner*	James Counsel; David Dicker; Archibald Park

=== Franklin ===
Six seats were up for election. The Labor Party was defending two seats, although Labor MHA Benjamin Watkins was running as an independent. The Nationalist Party was defending three seats. Independent MHA Benjamin Pearsall was defending one seat.

Labor candidates	Nationalist candidates	Independent candidates
Edward Brooker; John Dwyer*; John Hohne; William McGann; **Albert Ogilvie***	**Henry Baker***; Derrick Burgess; **Sir John Evans***; **John Piggott**; Clarence Rennie; Alfred Seabrook*	George Collis; Peter Murdoch; **Benjamin Pearsall**; **Benjamin Watkins***

=== Wilmot ===
Six seats were up for election. The Labor Party was defending three seats. The Nationalist Party was defending three seats.

Labor candidates	Nationalist candidates	Independent candidates
**Jens Jensen***; Henry Lane; **Eric Ogilvie***; Herbert Osborne; **William Shoobridge**	Llewellyn Atkinson*; **Percy Best**; Alfred Burbury*; **Neil Campbell***; **Sir Walter Lee***	Benjamin Whitham; John Williams

== See also ==
- Members of the Tasmanian House of Assembly, 1928–1931
- Members of the Tasmanian House of Assembly, 1931–1934
