= Candidates of the 1928 Tasmanian state election =

The 1928 Tasmanian state election was held on 30 May 1928. Since the last election, members of Sir Walter Lee's dissident Liberal grouping had rejoined the Nationalist Party.

== Retiring Members ==
=== Nationalist ===
- James Newton MHA (Bass)

== House of Assembly ==
Sitting members are shown in bold text. Tickets that elected at least one MHA are highlighted in the relevant colour. Successful candidates are indicated by an asterisk (*).

=== Bass ===
Six seats were up for election. The Labor Party was defending three seats. The Nationalist Party was defending three seats (two Liberals and one Nationalist).

Labor candidates	Nationalist candidates
**George Becker***; Thomas Davies; **Allan Guy***; Alfred Higgins; Harold Holmes; **Victor Shaw***	Harold Brumby; **Claude James***; John Kidd; James Lefevre; Robert Murphy; John Ockerby*; William Salisbury; **Henry Thomson***

=== Darwin ===
Six seats were up for election. The Labor Party was defending three seats. The Nationalist Party was defending three seats (two Nationalists and one Liberal).

Labor candidates	Nationalist candidates	Independent candidates
**James Belton***; **Philip Kelly***; **Henry Lane**; Fergus Medwin*; John O'Donnell; Robert Steel	**Edward Hobbs***; **Henry McFie***; Duncan McInnes; **Frank Marriott***; Richard Parsons	Joshua Whitsitt

=== Denison ===
Six seats were up for election. The Labor Party was defending four seats. The Nationalist Party was defending two seats.

Labor candidates	Nationalist candidates	Independent candidates
John Brown; **John Cleary**; **Robert Cosgrove***; **Charles Culley**; Edmund Dwyer-Gray*; William Lloyd; George Phillips; **Walter Woods***	George Davis; Charles Grant*; **John McPhee***; **John Soundy***; Horace Walch	John Graham; Gerald Mahoney (Ind Lab); William McHugo; Richard Stamford

=== Franklin ===
Six seats were up for election. The Labor Party was defending three seats. The Nationalist Party was defending one seat, although independent MHA John Piggott had joined the Nationalists. Independent MHA Peter Murdoch was defending one seat.

Labor candidates	Nationalist candidates	Independent candidates
Charles Frost; John Hohne; Samuel Lyden; William Michael; **Albert Ogilvie***; Will Reece; **William Sheridan**; **Benjamin Watkins***	Henry Baker*; George Cummins; **Sir John Evans***; **John Piggott***	John Earle; **Peter Murdoch**; Benjamin Pearsall*; Winston Triffitt

=== Wilmot ===
Six seats were up for election. The Labor Party was defending three seats. The Nationalist Party was defending two seats (one Nationalist, one Liberal). Independent MHA Norman Cameron was defending one seat.

Labor candidates	Nationalist candidates	Independent candidates
Leonard Bennett; Jens Jensen*; **Joseph Lyons***; Eric Ogilvie*; Herbert Osborne; **John Palamountain**; **William Shoobridge**	Percy Best*; **Neil Campbell***; **Sir Walter Lee***; George Rowell	**Norman Cameron**; Walter McShane

== See also ==
- Members of the Tasmanian House of Assembly, 1925–1928
- Members of the Tasmanian House of Assembly, 1928–1931
