= Members of the Tasmanian House of Assembly, 1925–1928 =

This is a list of members of the Tasmanian House of Assembly between the 3 June 1925 election and the 30 May 1928 election. The Liberal grouping was a minor party which had split from the Nationalists.

Name	Party	Division	Years in office
George Becker	Labor	Bass	1912–1931; 1934–1941
James Belton	Labor	Darwin	1909–1931
Norman Cameron	Independent	Wilmot	1893–1894; 1897–1899; 1912–1913; 1925–1928
Neil Campbell	Nationalist	Wilmot	1922–1955
John Cleary	Labor	Denison	1916–1928
Robert Cosgrove	Labor	Denison	1919–1922; 1925–1931; 1934–1958
Charles Culley	Labor	Denison	1922–1928; 1934–1948
John Evans	Nationalist	Franklin	1897–1937
Allan Guy	Labor	Bass	1916–1929
Edward Hobbs	Liberal/Nationalist	Darwin	1916–1934
James Hurst^{[1]}	Labor	Darwin	1910–1912; 1919–1926
Claude James	Liberal/Nationalist	Bass	1925–1937
Philip Kelly	Labor	Darwin	1922–1946
Henry Lane^{[1]}	Labor	Darwin	1926–1928; 1937–1946
Walter Lee	Liberal/Nationalist	Wilmot	1909–1946
Joseph Lyons	Labor	Wilmot	1909–1929
Henry McFie	Nationalist	Darwin	1925–1934; 1941–1948
John McPhee	Nationalist	Denison	1919–1934; 1941–1946
Frank Marriott	Nationalist	Darwin	1922–1946
Peter Murdoch	Independent	Franklin	1922–1928
James Newton	Liberal/Nationalist	Bass	1917–1928
Albert Ogilvie	Labor	Franklin	1919–1939
Michael O'Keefe^{[2]}	Labor	Wilmot	1912–1926
John Palamountain^{[2]}	Labor	Wilmot	1926–1928
John Piggott	Independent/Nationalist	Franklin	1922–1931
Victor Shaw	Labor	Bass	1925–1936
William Sheridan	Labor	Franklin	1909–1913; 1914–1928
William Shoobridge	Labor	Wilmot	1916–1919; 1922–1928; 1929–1931
John Soundy	Nationalist	Denison	1925–1946
Henry Thomson	Nationalist	Bass	1925–1931
Benjamin Watkins	Labor	Franklin	1906–1917; 1919–1922; 1925–1934
Walter Woods	Labor	Denison	1906–1917; 1925–1931

== Notes ==
^{1} Labor MHA for Darwin, James Hurst, resigned in June 1926. A recount on 30 June 1926 elected Labor candidate Henry Lane.
^{2} Labor MHA for Wilmot and Speaker of the House, Michael O'Keefe, was killed in a railway accident on 2 October 1926. A recount on 22 October 1926 elected Labor candidate John Palamountain.

== Sources ==
- Hughes, Colin A.; Graham, B. D. (1976). Voting for the South Australian, Western Australian and Tasmanian Lower Houses, 1890-1964. Canberra: Australian National University. ISBN 0-7081-1334-6.
- Parliament of Tasmania (2006). The Parliament of Tasmania from 1856
