= Members of the Tasmanian House of Assembly, 1922–1925 =

This is a list of members of the Tasmanian House of Assembly between the 10 June 1922 election and the 3 June 1925 election. The fledgling Country Party got five members elected, including two former Nationalists, but by the end of the term the party had all but merged into the Nationalist Party. A new Liberal Party emerged before the 1925 election, counting the support of three MHAs.

| Name | Party | Division | Years in office |
|---|---|---|---|
| George Becker | Labor | Bass | 1912–1931; 1934–1941 |
| James Belton | Labor | Darwin | 1909–1931 |
| Albert Bendall | Country/Nationalist | Wilmot | 1922–1925 |
| Ernest Blyth | Country/Nationalist | Wilmot | 1913–1925 |
| Neil Campbell | Nationalist | Wilmot | 1922–1955 |
| John Cleary | Labor | Denison | 1916–1928 |
| Charles Culley | Labor | Denison | 1922–1928; 1934–1948 |
| John Evans | Nationalist | Franklin | 1897–1937 |
| Richard Franks | Country | Darwin | 1922–1925 |
| Charles Grant | Nationalist | Denison | 1922–1925; 1928–1932 |
| Allan Guy | Labor | Bass | 1916–1929 |
| John Hayes^{[3]} | Nationalist | Bass | 1913–1923 |
| Alexander Hean | Nationalist | Franklin | 1903–1913; 1916–1925 |
| Edward Hobbs | Country/Liberal | Darwin | 1916–1934 |
| James Hurst | Labor | Darwin | 1910–1912; 1919–1926 |
| Jens Jensen | Ind. Labor | Bass | 1903–1910; 1922–1925; 1928–1934 |
| Philip Kelly^{[2]} | Labor | Darwin | 1922–1946 |
| Walter Lee | Nationalist/Liberal | Wilmot | 1909–1946 |
| Joseph Lyons | Labor | Wilmot | 1909–1929 |
| John McPhee | Nationalist | Denison | 1919–1934; 1941–1946 |
| Frank Marriott | Nationalist | Darwin | 1922–1946 |
| Alexander Marshall | Nationalist | Bass | 1914–1925 |
| Peter Murdoch | Nationalist/Independent | Franklin | 1922–1928 |
| James Newton | Nationalist/Liberal | Bass | 1917–1928 |
| James Ogden^{[2]} | Labor | Darwin | 1906–1922 |
| Albert Ogilvie | Labor | Franklin | 1919–1939 |
| Michael O'Keefe | Labor | Wilmot | 1912–1926 |
| Leslie Payne^{[4]} | Nationalist | Denison | 1924–1925 |
| William Pearce^{[1]} | Labor | Franklin | 1922 |
| John Piggott | Country/Independent | Franklin | 1922–1931 |
| William Sheridan | Labor | Denison | 1909–1913; 1914–1928 |
| George Shields^{[3]} | Nationalist | Bass | 1923–1925 |
| William Shoobridge^{[1]} | Labor | Franklin | 1916–1919; 1922–1928; 1929–1931 |
| Robert Snowden^{[4]} | Nationalist | Denison | 1919–1924 |

== Notes ==
^{1} Labor MHA for Franklin, William Pearce, died 16 days into his term on 26 June 1922. A recount on 11 July 1922 elected Labor candidate William Shoobridge.
^{2} Labor MHA for Darwin, James Ogden, resigned to contest a seat on the Australian Senate on 1 November 1922. A recount on 14 November 1922 elected Labor candidate Philip Kelly.
^{3} Nationalist MHA for Bass, John Hayes, was appointed by joint sitting to the Australian Senate, and hence resigned. A recount on 24 September 1923 elected Nationalist candidate George Shields.
^{4} Nationalist MHA for Denison, Robert Snowden resigned on 1 July 1924. A recount on 23 July 1924 elected Nationalist candidate Leslie Payne, the son of long-standing former member Herbert Payne.

== Sources ==
- Hughes, Colin A.; Graham, B. D. (1976). Voting for the South Australian, Western Australian and Tasmanian Lower Houses, 1890-1964. Canberra: Australian National University. ISBN 0-7081-1334-6.
- Parliament of Tasmania (2006). The Parliament of Tasmania from 1856
