= Members of the Tasmanian House of Assembly, 1931–1934 =

This is a list of members of the Tasmanian House of Assembly between the 9 May 1931 election and the 9 June 1934 election. The 1931 election produced a landslide victory for the Nationalists, in what turned out to be the non-Labor parties' last term in office until 1969.

Name	Party	Division	Years in office
Llewellyn Atkinson	Nationalist	Wilmot	1931–1934
Henry Baker	Nationalist	Franklin	1928–1946
Howard Barber^{[2]}	Nationalist	Bass	1931–1933
Alfred Burbury	Nationalist	Wilmot	1931–1934
Thomas Butler	Nationalist	Darwin	1931–1934
Neil Campbell	Nationalist	Wilmot	1922–1955
Thomas d'Alton	Labor	Darwin	1931–1944
Thomas Davies	Labor	Bass	1929–1942
John James Dwyer	Labor	Franklin	1931–1962
Edmund Dwyer-Gray	Labor	Denison	1928–1945
John Evans	Nationalist	Franklin	1897–1937
Charles Grant^{[1]}	Nationalist	Denison	1922–1925; 1928–1932
Edward Hobbs	Nationalist	Darwin	1916–1934
Claude James	Nationalist	Bass	1925–1937
Jens Jensen	Labor	Wilmot	1903–1910; 1922–1925; 1928–1934
Philip Kelly	Labor	Darwin	1922–1946
Walter Lee	Nationalist	Wilmot	1909–1946
Arndell Lewis^{[1]}	Nationalist	Denison	1932–1934; 1937–1941
Henry McFie	Nationalist	Darwin	1925–1934; 1941–1948
John McPhee	Nationalist	Denison	1919–1934; 1941–1946
Gerald Mahoney	Labor	Denison	1931–1934
Frank Marriott	Nationalist	Darwin	1922–1946
Robert Murphy	Nationalist	Bass	1931–1934
John Ockerby	Nationalist	Bass	1928–1946
Albert Ogilvie	Labor	Franklin	1919–1939
Eric Ogilvie	Labor	Wilmot	1928–1940
Dr Herbert Postle^{[2]}	Nationalist	Bass	1933–1934
Alfred Seabrook	Nationalist	Franklin	1931–1934
Victor Shaw	Labor	Bass	1925–1936
John Soundy	Nationalist	Denison	1925–1946
Ernest Turner	Nationalist	Denison	1931–1937; 1941
Benjamin Watkins	Independent	Franklin	1906–1917; 1919–1922; 1925–1934

== Notes ==
^{1} Nationalist MHA for Denison, Charles Grant, was elected to the Australian Senate at a joint sitting of Parliament on 2 March 1932. A recount on 14 March 1932 resulted in Nationalist candidate Arndell Lewis being elected.
^{2} Nationalist MHA for Bass, Howard Barber, resigned on 26 May 1933. A recount on 6 June 1933 resulted in Nationalist candidate Dr Herbert Postle being elected—the first member of a Tasmanian parliament to hold a doctorate (Doctor of Laws from the University of Melbourne).

== Sources ==
- Hughes, Colin A.; Graham, B. D. (1976). Voting for the South Australian, Western Australian and Tasmanian Lower Houses, 1890-1964. Canberra: Australian National University. ISBN 0-7081-1334-6.
- Parliament of Tasmania (2006). The Parliament of Tasmania from 1856
