= Members of the Tasmanian House of Assembly, 1928–1931 =

This is a list of members of the Tasmanian House of Assembly between the 30 May 1928 election and the 9 May 1931 election. The 1928 election failed to deliver a majority, and the Nationalists' John McPhee took over from Labor's Joseph Lyons as Premier of Tasmania. Lyons subsequently retired from state politics, obtaining election to the Federal seat of Wilmot and going on to become Prime Minister of Australia in 1931.

Name	Party	Division	Years in office
Henry Baker	Nationalist	Franklin	1928–1946
George Becker	Labor	Bass	1912–1931; 1934–1941
James Belton	Labor	Darwin	1909–1931
Percy Best	Nationalist	Wilmot	1928–1931
Neil Campbell	Nationalist	Wilmot	1922–1955
Robert Cosgrove	Labor	Denison	1919–1922; 1925–1931; 1934–1958
Thomas Davies^{[2]}	Labor	Bass	1929–1942
Edmund Dwyer-Gray	Labor	Denison	1928–1945
John Evans	Nationalist	Franklin	1897–1937
Charles Grant	Nationalist	Denison	1922–1925; 1928–1932
Allan Guy^{[2]}	Labor	Bass	1916–1929
Edward Hobbs	Nationalist	Darwin	1916–1934
Claude James	Nationalist	Bass	1925–1937
Jens Jensen	Labor	Wilmot	1903–1910; 1922–1925; 1928–1934
Philip Kelly	Labor	Darwin	1922–1946
Walter Lee	Nationalist	Wilmot	1909–1946
Joseph Lyons^{[1]}	Labor	Wilmot	1909–1929
Henry McFie	Nationalist	Darwin	1925–1934; 1941–1948
John McPhee	Nationalist	Denison	1919–1934; 1941–1946
Frank Marriott	Nationalist	Darwin	1922–1946
Fergus Medwin	Labor/Independent	Darwin	1928–1931
John Ockerby	Nationalist	Bass	1928–1946
Albert Ogilvie	Labor	Franklin	1919–1939
Eric Ogilvie	Labor	Wilmot	1928–1940
Benjamin Pearsall	Independent	Franklin	1928–1931; 1934–1937
John Piggott	Nationalist	Franklin	1922–1931
Victor Shaw	Labor	Bass	1925–1936
William Shoobridge^{[1]}	Labor	Wilmot	1916–1919; 1922–1928; 1929–1931
John Soundy	Nationalist	Denison	1925–1946
Henry Thomson	Nationalist	Bass	1925–1931
Benjamin Watkins	Labor/Independent	Franklin	1906–1917; 1919–1922; 1925–1934
Walter Woods	Labor	Denison	1906–1917; 1925–1931

== Notes ==
^{1} Labor MHA for Wilmot, Joseph Lyons, resigned to contest the federal seat of Wilmot at the 1929 election. A recount on 27 September 1929 resulted in Labor candidate William Shoobridge being elected.
^{2} Labor MHA for Bass, Allan Guy, resigned to contest the federal seat of Bass. Due to the ballot papers from the previous election having been lost in a flood, the standard countback was not able to be conducted and a by-election was held instead. Thomas Davies – who would ordinarily have filled the seat on the countback – was declared elected unopposed on 5 October 1929.

== Sources ==
- Hughes, Colin A.; Graham, B. D. (1976). Voting for the South Australian, Western Australian and Tasmanian Lower Houses, 1890-1964. Canberra: Australian National University. ISBN 0-7081-1334-6.
- Parliament of Tasmania (2006). The Parliament of Tasmania from 1856
