= Members of the Tasmanian House of Assembly, 1934–1937 =

This is a list of members of the Tasmanian House of Assembly between the 9 June 1934 election and the 20 February 1937 election. The 1934 election reduced the Nationalists from one of their biggest majorities ever into opposition, as Labor leader Albert Ogilvie became Premier of Tasmania. It was not until 1969 that the Nationalists' successors, the Liberals, would achieve another term of office.

Name	Party	Division	Years in office
Henry Baker	Nationalist	Franklin	1928–1946
George Becker	Independent	Wilmot	1912–1931; 1934–1941
Edward Brooker	Labor	Franklin	1934–1948
Donald K. Cameron	Nationalist	Wilmot	1934–1937
Hon Neil Campbell	Nationalist	Wilmot	1922–1955
Rev George Carruthers	Independent	Denison	1934–1937
Jack Chamberlain	Nationalist	Darwin	1934–1951
Hon Robert Cosgrove	Labor	Denison	1919–1922; 1925–1931; 1934–1958
Charles Culley	Labor	Denison	1922–1928; 1934–1948
Hon Thomas d'Alton	Labor	Darwin	1931–1944
Hon Thomas Davies	Labor	Bass	1929–1942
John Dwyer	Labor	Franklin	1931–1962
Hon Edmund Dwyer-Gray	Labor	Denison	1928–1945
Frank Edwards	Nationalist	Darwin	1934–1940
John Evans	Nationalist	Franklin	1897–1937
Allen Hollingsworth	Nationalist	Bass	1934–1941
Claude James	Nationalist	Bass	1925–1937
Philip Kelly	Labor	Darwin	1922–1946
Hon Sir Walter Lee	Nationalist	Wilmot	1909–1946
John McDonald	Labor	Bass	1934–1945
Joseph McGrath	Labor	Darwin	1934–1937
John Madden^{[1]}	Labor	Bass	1936–1956; 1957–1969
Frank Marriott	Nationalist	Darwin	1922–1946
John Ockerby	Nationalist	Bass	1928–1946
Hon Albert Ogilvie	Labor	Franklin	1919–1939
Hon Eric Ogilvie	Labor	Wilmot	1928–1940
David O'Keefe	Labor	Wilmot	1934–1943
Benjamin Pearsall	Independent	Franklin	1928–1931; 1934–1937
Victor Shaw^{[1]}	Labor	Bass	1925–1936
John Soundy	Nationalist	Denison	1925–1946
Ernest Turner	Nationalist	Denison	1931–1937; 1941

== Notes ==
^{1} Labor MHA for Bass, Victor Shaw, died on 14 June 1936. A recount on 25 June 1936 resulted in Labor candidate John Madden being elected.

== Sources ==
- Hughes, Colin A.; Graham, B. D. (1976). Voting for the South Australian, Western Australian and Tasmanian Lower Houses, 1890-1964. Canberra: Australian National University. ISBN 0-7081-1334-6.
- Parliament of Tasmania (2006). The Parliament of Tasmania from 1856
