= Candidates of the 1941 Tasmanian state election =

The 1941 Tasmanian state election was held on 13 December 1941.

== Retiring Members ==
No MHAs retired at this election.

== House of Assembly ==
Sitting members are shown in bold text. Tickets that elected at least one MHA are highlighted in the relevant colour. Successful candidates are indicated by an asterisk (*).

=== Bass ===
Six seats were up for election. The Labor Party was defending four seats. The Nationalist Party was defending two seats.

Labor candidates	Nationalist candidates
**Thomas Davies***; **Eric Howroyd***; **John McDonald***; **John Madden***; John Quintal; Alan Welsh	**Allen Hollingsworth**; **Frank Marriott***; **John Ockerby***; Desmond Oldham; Ernest Pitchford

=== Darwin ===
Six seats were up for election. The Labor Party was defending three seats. The Nationalist Party was defending three seats.

Labor candidates	Nationalist candidates
James Bugg*; **Thomas d'Alton***; **Philip Kelly***; **Henry Lane***; Michael Smith	Gerald Acheson; Norman Booth; Stephen Broad; **Jack Chamberlain***; Russell Green; Henry McFie*; **John Wright**

=== Denison ===
Six seats were up for election. The Labor Party was defending four seats. The Nationalist Party was defending two seats.

Labor candidates	Nationalist candidates	Ungrouped candidates
**Robert Cosgrove***; **Charles Culley***; **Edmund Dwyer-Gray***; **Francis Heerey**; Sarah Kelly; Alfred White*	Charles Atkins*; Robert Harvey; Albert Kalbfell; Dugald McDougall; Raymond Smith; **John Soundy***; **Ernest Turner**	Michael O'Reilly

=== Franklin ===
Six seats were up for election. The Labor Party was defending four seats. The Nationalist Party was defending two seats.

Labor candidates	Nationalist candidates	Ungrouped candidates
**Edward Brooker***; **John Dwyer***; Henry Hope*; **Francis McDermott**; Thomas McKinley*; **Basil Plummer**	**Henry Baker***; Albert Beard; Arthur Crisp; Leo McPartlan; Sir John McPhee*; Benjamin Pearsall; John Piggott; **Vincent Shoobridge**	Thomas Kimber

=== Wilmot ===
Six seats were up for election. The Labor Party was defending three seats. The Nationalist Party was defending three seats.

Labor candidates	Nationalist candidates
**David O'Keefe***; Peter Pike; **Lancelot Spurr***; **William Taylor***; Ernest West*	**Neil Campbell***; **Francis Foster**; Thomas Johnston; **Sir Walter Lee***; Raymond Madden; Milton Taylor

== See also ==
- Members of the Tasmanian House of Assembly, 1937–1941
- Members of the Tasmanian House of Assembly, 1941–1946
