= Members of the Tasmanian House of Assembly, 1937–1941 =

This is a list of members of the Tasmanian House of Assembly between the 20 February 1937 election and the 13 December 1941 election. The term was elongated due to World War II.

Name	Party	Division	Years in office
Henry Baker	Nationalist	Franklin	1928–1946
Hon George Becker^{[6]}	Labor	Wilmot	1912–1931; 1934–1941
Hon Edward Brooker	Labor	Franklin	1934–1948
Neil Campbell	Nationalist	Wilmot	1922–1955
Jack Chamberlain	Nationalist	Darwin	1934–1951
Hon Robert Cosgrove	Labor	Denison	1919–1922; 1925–1931; 1934–1958
Charles Culley	Labor	Denison	1922–1928; 1934–1948
Hon Thomas d'Alton	Labor	Darwin	1931–1944
Hon Thomas Davies	Labor	Bass	1929–1942
George Doyle^{[5]}	Nationalist	Franklin	1937–1940
John Dwyer	Labor	Franklin	1931–1962
Hon Edmund Dwyer-Gray	Labor	Denison	1928–1945
Frank Edwards^{[4]}	Nationalist	Darwin	1934–1940
Francis Foster	Nationalist	Wilmot	1937–1941
Francis Heerey	Labor	Denison	1937–1941; 1945–1946
Allen Hollingsworth	Nationalist	Bass	1934–1941
Eric Howroyd	Labor	Bass	1937–1950; 1958–1959
Philip Kelly	Labor	Darwin	1922–1946
Henry Lane^{[1]}	Labor	Darwin	1926–1928; 1937–1946
Hon Sir Walter Lee	Nationalist	Wilmot	1909–1946
Arndell Lewis^{[7]}	Nationalist	Denison	1932–1934; 1937–1941
John McDonald	Labor	Bass	1934–1945
Francis McDermott^{[2]}	Labor	Franklin	1939–1941
Joseph McGrath^{[1]}	Labor	Darwin	1934–1937
Hon John Madden	Labor	Bass	1936–1956; 1957–1969
Frank Marriott	Nationalist	Darwin	1922–1946
John Ockerby	Nationalist	Bass	1928–1946
Hon Albert Ogilvie^{[2]}	Labor	Franklin	1919–1939
Hon Eric Ogilvie^{[3]}	Labor	Wilmot	1928–1940
David O'Keefe	Labor	Wilmot	1934–1943
Basil Plummer	Labor	Franklin	1937–1941
Vincent Shoobridge^{[5]}	Nationalist	Franklin	1940–1941
John Soundy	Nationalist	Denison	1925–1946
Lancelot Spurr^{[6]}	Labor	Wilmot	1941–1956
William Taylor^{[3]}	Labor	Wilmot	1940–1946
Ernest Turner^{[7]}	Nationalist	Denison	1931–1937; 1941
John Wright^{[4]}	Nationalist	Darwin	1940–1941

== Notes ==
^{1} Labor MHA for Darwin, Joseph McGrath, died on 16 March 1937, just days after the election. A recount on 5 April 1937 resulted in Labor candidate Henry Lane being elected.
^{2} Labor MHA for Franklin and Premier of Tasmania, Albert Ogilvie, died on 10 June 1939. A recount on 28 June 1939 resulted in Labor candidate Francis McDermott being elected.
^{3} Labor MHA for Wilmot, Eric Ogilvie, resigned in August 1940. A recount on 28 August 1940 resulted in Labor candidate William Taylor being elected.
^{4} Nationalist MHA for Darwin, Frank Edwards, resigned in August 1940. A recount on 31 August 1940 resulted in Nationalist candidate John Wright being elected.
^{5} Nationalist MHA for Franklin, George Doyle, died on 26 October 1940. A recount on 8 November 1940 resulted in Nationalist candidate Vincent Shoobridge being elected.
^{6} Labor (formerly Independent) MHA for Wilmot, George Becker, died on 23 April 1941. A recount on 8 May 1941 resulted in Labor candidate Lancelot Spurr being elected.
^{7} Nationalist MHA for Denison, Arndell Lewis, resigned in May 1941. A recount on 2 June 1941 resulted in Nationalist candidate Ernest Turner being elected.

== Sources ==
- Hughes, Colin A.; Graham, B. D. (1976). Voting for the South Australian, Western Australian and Tasmanian Lower Houses, 1890-1964. Canberra: Australian National University. ISBN 0-7081-1334-6.
- Parliament of Tasmania (2006). The Parliament of Tasmania from 1856
