= Results of the 1950 Tasmanian state election =

Australian state election results

Tasmanian state election, 6 May 1950 House of Assembly << 1948–1955 >>
Enrolled voters	161,650				
Votes cast	152,785		Turnout	94.52	+2.28
Informal votes	6,841		Informal	4.48	+0.53
Summary of votes by party
Party	Primary votes	%	Swing	Seats	Change
Labor	70,976	48.63	–0.75	15	± 0
Liberal	69,429	47.57	+9.73	14	+ 2
Independent	5,453	3.74	–2.10	1	– 1
Communist	86	0.06	+0.06	0	± 0
Ind. Lib.			–6.82	0	– 1
Total	145,944			30	

This is a list of House of Assembly results for the 1950 Tasmanian election.

== Results by division ==
=== Bass ===
1950 Tasmanian state election: Bass
Party	Candidate	Votes	%	±%
Quota		4,289		
Labor	John Madden (elected 1)	4,103	13.7	−3.1
Labor	Reg Turnbull (elected 2)	3,855	12.8	−2.0
Labor	Claude Barnard (elected 3)	2,847	9.5	+9.5
Labor	William Oliver	1,897	6.3	+6.3
Labor	Alexander Atkins	1,817	6.1	0.0
Labor	Eric Howroyd	1,752	5.8	−2.8
Liberal	John Steer (elected 5)	3,458	11.5	+3.7
Liberal	John Orchard (elected 6)	3,189	10.6	+2.2
Liberal	Bill Beattie	2,774	9.2	+1.6
Liberal	Fred Marriott (elected 4)	2,752	9.2	−2.9
Liberal	James Guy	852	2.8	+2.8
Liberal	James McGowen	726	2.4	+2.4
Total formal votes		30,022	96.1	−0.7
Informal votes		1,211	3.9	+0.7
Turnout		31,233	94.9	+5.1
Party total votes
Labor		14,937	54.2	−1.7
Liberal		13,751	45.8	+1.7

=== Darwin ===
1950 Tasmanian state election: Darwin
Party	Candidate	Votes	%	±%
Quota		4,011		
Liberal	Jack Chamberlain (elected 2)	4,139	14.7	+2.1
Liberal	John Fidler (elected 5)	2,580	9.2	+1.2
Liberal	Kevin Lyons (elected 6)	2,526	9.0	+3.6
Liberal	Jack Breheny	2,461	8.8	+8.8
Liberal	Raymond Powys	1,352	4.8	+4.8
Liberal	Hector McFie	1,132	4.0	+4.0
Liberal	Mervyn Langham	512	1.8	+1.8
Labor	Eric Reece (elected 1)	5,076	18.1	+0.1
Labor	Charley Aylett (elected 3)	4,018	14.3	+0.6
Labor	Carrol Bramich (elected 4)	2,017	7.2	+1.1
Labor	Edward Beachcroft	1,100	3.9	+3.9
Labor	Gordon O'Shannessey	704	2.5	+2.5
Labor	Patrick Streets	554	2.0	+2.0
Independent	Thomas Cornelius	240	0.9	+0.9
Total formal votes		28,070	96.2	+0.7
Informal votes		1,115	3.8	−0.7
Turnout		29,185	94.7	+0.1
Party total votes
Liberal		14,702	52.4	+6.7
Labor		13,128	46.8	−0.9
Independent	Thomas Cornelius	240	0.9	+0.9

=== Denison ===
1950 Tasmanian state election: Denison
Party	Candidate	Votes	%	±%
Quota		3,978		
Labor	Robert Cosgrove (elected 2)	6,382	22.9	+2.5
Labor	Alfred White (elected 4)	2,646	9.5	−1.7
Labor	Frank Gaha (elected 3)	2,535	9.1	+9.1
Labor	Henry Hope	558	2.0	−1.8
Labor	William Morgan	393	1.4	+1.4
Labor	Lloyd Neville	357	1.3	+1.3
Liberal	Rex Townley (elected 1)	10,130	36.4	+36.4
Liberal	Campbell Duncan	557	2.0	−3.1
Liberal	Arthur Hay	524	1.9	+1.9
Liberal	John Driscoll	435	1.6	+1.6
Liberal	Horace Strutt (elected 5)	380	1.4	−4.0
Liberal	Roy Cazaly	256	0.9	+0.9
Independent	Bill Wedd (elected 6)	2,437	8.8	−1.4
Independent	Leo McPartlan	166	0.6	+0.6
Communist	Max Bound	86	0.3	+0.3
Total formal votes		27,842	93.7	−1.8
Informal votes		1,857	6.3	+1.8
Turnout		29,699	93.3	+3.2
Party total votes
Labor		12,871	46.2	+1.7
Liberal		12,282	44.1	+23.2
Independent		2,603	9.3	−2.8
Communist		86	0.3	+0.3

=== Franklin ===
1950 Tasmanian state election: Franklin
Party	Candidate	Votes	%	±%
Quota		4,288		
Liberal	Tim Jackson (elected 2)	3,930	13.1	+5.9
Liberal	Archibald Park (elected 5)	2,527	8.4	+3.2
Liberal	Harold Solomon	2,507	8.4	+8.4
Liberal	Thomas Pearsall (elected 6)	2,499	8.3	+8.3
Liberal	Ernest Barwick	1,771	5.9	+5.9
Liberal	Arthur Griffiths	807	2.7	+1.4
Labor	John Dwyer (elected 1)	3,845	12.8	−3.6
Labor	Bill Neilson (elected 3)	3,510	11.7	+1.2
Labor	Charles Hand (elected 4)	2,464	8.2	−1.6
Labor	George Robbie	2,202	7.3	+7.3
Labor	Edward Cullen	950	3.2	+3.2
Labor	Harry Fletcher	391	1.3	+1.3
Independent	George Gray	2,610	8.7	+0.4
Total formal votes		30,013	95.8	−0.1
Informal votes		1,318	4.2	+0.1
Turnout		31,331	95.5	+1.6
Party total votes
Liberal		14,041	46.8	+13.0
Labor		13,362	44.5	−3.3
Independent	George Gray (Group)	2,610	8.7	−9.1

=== Wilmot ===
1950 Tasmanian state election: Wilmot
Party	Candidate	Votes	%	±%
Quota		4,286		
Labor	Roy Fagan (elected 1)	6,456	21.5	+1.5
Labor	Douglas Cashion (elected 3)	2,905	9.7	+4.8
Labor	Lancelot Spurr (elected 6)	2,211	7.4	−1.2
Labor	Reg Fisher	1,621	5.4	+5.4
Labor	Angus von Bertouch	1,155	3.9	+3.9
Labor	Robert Phair	996	3.3	+3.3
Liberal	Neil Campbell (elected 2)	5,446	18.2	−4.0
Liberal	Charles Best (elected 4)	2,974	9.9	+5.1
Liberal	Angus Bethune (elected 5)	2,012	6.7	+2.2
Liberal	Percy Williams	1,989	6.6	+6.6
Liberal	Robert Robertson	1,402	4.7	−0.5
Liberal	George Hodson	830	2.8	+2.8
Total formal votes		29,997	95.7	−1.0
Informal votes		1,340	4.3	+1.0
Turnout		31,337	94.1	+1.6
Party total votes
Labor		15,344	51.2	−0.5
Liberal		14,653	48.8	+3.0

== See also ==
- 1950 Tasmanian state election
- Members of the Tasmanian House of Assembly, 1950–1955
- Candidates of the 1950 Tasmanian state election
