= Members of the Tasmanian House of Assembly, 1946–1948 =

This is a list of members of the Tasmanian House of Assembly between the 23 November 1946 election and the 21 August 1948 election. The Nationalist Party had dissolved and its members had joined the new Liberal Party by the time of the election.

Name	Party	Division	Years in office
Alexander Atkins	Labor	Bass	1946–1948; 1956–1972
Charles Atkins	Liberal	Denison	1941–1948
Charley Aylett	Labor	Darwin	1946–1964
Bill Beattie	Liberal	Bass	1946–1950; 1954–1979
Angus Bethune	Liberal	Wilmot	1946–1975
Carrol Bramich	Labor	Darwin	1946–1964
Hon Edward Brooker^{[1]}	Labor	Franklin	1934–1948
John Harold Brown^{[1]}	Labor	Franklin	1948
Neil Campbell	Liberal	Wilmot	1922–1955
Jack Chamberlain	Liberal	Darwin	1934–1951
Hon Robert Cosgrove	Labor	Denison	1919–1922; 1925–1931; 1934–1958
Charles Culley	Labor	Denison	1922–1928; 1934–1948
John Dwyer	Labor	Franklin	1931–1962
Hon Roy Fagan	Labor	Wilmot	1946–1974
John Fidler	Liberal	Darwin	1946–1956
George Gray	Independent	Franklin	1946–1950
Hon Eric Howroyd	Labor	Bass	1937–1950; 1958–1959
Tim Jackson	Liberal	Franklin	1946–1964
Henry McFie	Liberal/Independent	Darwin	1925–1934; 1941–1948
Hon John Madden	Labor	Bass	1936–1956; 1957–1969
Fred Marriott	Liberal	Bass	1946–1961
Bill Neilson	Labor	Franklin	1946–1977
Peter Pike	Labor	Wilmot	1943–1949
Hon Eric Reece	Labor	Darwin	1946–1975
Lancelot Spurr	Labor	Wilmot	1941–1956
Horace Strutt	Liberal	Denison	1946–1959; 1959–1969
Rex Townley	Independent	Denison	1946–1965
Dr Reg Turnbull	Labor	Bass	1946–1961
Hon Alfred White	Labor	Denison	1941–1959
Reg Wright	Liberal	Franklin	1946–1949
Robert Robertson	Liberal	Wilmot	1946–1950

== Notes ==
^{1} Labor MHA for Franklin, Edward Brooker, died on 18 June 1948. A recount on 28 June 1948 resulted in the election of Labor candidate John Harold Brown—as it turned out, Brown served the shortest term of any MHA, of just seven weeks.

== Sources ==
- Hughes, Colin A.; Graham, B. D. (1976). Voting for the South Australian, Western Australian and Tasmanian Lower Houses, 1890-1964. Canberra: Australian National University. ISBN 0-7081-1334-6.
- Parliament of Tasmania (2006). The Parliament of Tasmania from 1856
