= Candidates of the 1950 Tasmanian state election =

The 1950 Tasmanian state election was held on 6 May 1950.

== Retiring Members ==
No MHAs retired at this election.

== House of Assembly ==
Sitting members are shown in bold text. Tickets that elected at least one MHA are highlighted in the relevant colour. Successful candidates are indicated by an asterisk (*).

=== Bass ===
Six seats were up for election. The Labor Party was defending three seats. The Liberal Party was defending three seats.

Labor candidates	Liberal candidates
Alexander Atkins; Claude Barnard*; **Eric Howroyd**; **John Madden***; William Oliver; **Reg Turnbull***	**Bill Beattie**; James Guy; James McGowen; **Fred Marriott***; **John Orchard***; John Steer*

=== Darwin ===
Six seats were up for election. The Labor Party was defending three seats. The Liberal Party was defending three seats.

Labor candidates	Liberal candidates	Ungrouped candidates
**Charley Aylett***; Edward Beachcroft; **Carrol Bramich***; Gordon O'Shannessey; **Eric Reece***; Patrick Streets	Jack Breheny; **Jack Chamberlain***; **John Fidler***; Mervyn Langham; **Kevin Lyons***; Hector McFie; Raymond Powys	Thomas Cornelius

=== Denison ===
Six seats were up for election. The Labor Party was defending three seats. The Liberal Party was defending one seat. One seat was being defended by independent MHA Bill Wedd. The final seat had been won by Rex Townley as an independent Liberal; he had since joined the Liberal Party.

Labor candidates	Liberal candidates	Independent candidates	Ungrouped candidates
**Robert Cosgrove***; Frank Gaha*; **Henry Hope**; William Morgan; Lloyd Neville; **Alfred White***	Roy Cazaly; John Driscoll; Campbell Duncan; Arthur Hay; **Horace Strutt***; **Rex Townley***	Leo McPartlan; **Bill Wedd***	Max Bound (CPA)

=== Franklin ===
Six seats were up for election. The Labor Party was defending three seats. The Liberal Party was defending two seats. Independent MHA George Gray was defending one seat.

Labor candidates	Liberal candidates	Ungrouped candidates
Edward Cullen; **John Dwyer***; Harry Fletcher; **Charles Hand***; **Bill Neilson***; George Robbie	Ernest Barwick; Arthur Griffiths; **Tim Jackson***; **Archibald Park***; Thomas Pearsall*; Harold Solomon	**George Gray**

=== Wilmot ===
Six seats were up for election. The Labor Party was defending three seats. The Liberal Party was defending three seats.

Labor candidates	Liberal candidates
**Douglas Cashion***; **Roy Fagan***; Reg Fisher; Robert Phair; **Lancelot Spurr***; Angus von Bertouch	Charles Best*; **Angus Bethune***; **Neil Campbell***; George Hodson; **Robert Robertson**; Percy Williams

== See also ==
- Members of the Tasmanian House of Assembly, 1948–1950
- Members of the Tasmanian House of Assembly, 1950–1955
