= Neil Robson (politician) =

Australian politician

The Honourable Neil Robson AM

Member of the Tasmanian House of Assembly for Bass
- In office 11 December 1976 – 1 February 1992

Personal details
- Born: Neil Maxwell Robson; 5 July 1928 Smithton, Tasmania, Australia
- Died: 14 December 2013 (aged 85) Launceston, Tasmania, Australia
- Party: Liberal Party

Military service
- Allegiance: Australia
- Branch/service: Royal Australian Navy
- Years of service: 1945–1947
- Rank: Able Seaman
- Unit: HMAS Quickmatch (G92)

Neil Maxwell Robson AM (5 July 1928 – 14 December 2013) was a Tasmanian member of parliament from 1976 to 1992. He was a Liberal member in the House of Assembly division of Bass.

Robson is known for championing the introduction of a system of rotating the order of names printed on ballot papers at elections, often known as the Robson Rotation.

== Early life ==
Robson was born in Smithton, Tasmania in July 1928. His father was a saddler, builder and undertaker from Sheffield, who was also a World War I veteran. He died in Roma, Queensland—three months after Robson's birth—after contracting tuberculosis. His mother was from England, and moved to Smithton with her father after his retirement from the British Army. In 1941, Robson won a scholarship to attend Launceston Church Grammar School.

== Military service ==
In 1944, Robson attempted to enlist in the Royal Australian Navy, although he was a year under the minimum age of seventeen, and his mother refused to provide a statutory declaration claiming he was old enough. On 15 August 1945, he enlisted and was trained at Flinders Naval Depot and posted to the naval base HMAS Lonsdale. He gained a posting aboard HMAS Quickmatch by asking the captain for one, and served with the British Commonwealth Occupation Force in Papua New Guinea and Japan in the aftermath of World War II. Following his service overseas, he returned to Flinders Naval Depot, and was demobilised as an Able Seaman at HMAS Huon.

== Banking career ==
After leaving the navy, Robson refused a university place, to his later regret. He worked for many years at the Launceston Savings Bank (LSB), whilst completing an accounting degree as a correspondence course.

== Personal life ==
Robson married Desiree Tyson in May 1949, and they had three children: Jill, Paul and Jan.

== Honours ==
On Australia Day 2007, he was made a Member of the Order of Australia for "service to electoral reform through the voting system, to the Tasmanian Parliament, and to fishing and community organisations". He was also a member of Mensa International.

== Publications ==
- Robson, Neil Maxwell; Scholes, David (1970), Tasmanian angler, Foot and Playsted, ISBN 978-0-9599873-0-0
- Robson, Neil (2005), Tails of a Tasmanian angler, N. Robson, ISBN 978-0-9757362-1-0
- Robson, Neil (1998), Handbook for club treasurers & secretaries, The Author
- Robson, Neil (2004), Everybody counts : Tasmania's unique electoral system Hare-Clark with Robson Rotation, Government Printer?
