= 1950 Tasmanian state election =

State election in Australia

- 6 May 1950

All 30 seats to the House of Assembly
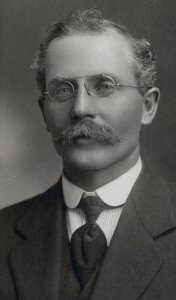

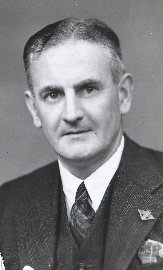
	First party	Second party
Leader	Robert Cosgrove	Rex Townley
Party	Labor	Liberal
Leader since	25 February 1948	6 February 1950
Leader's seat	Denison	Denison
Last election	15 seats	12 seats
Seats won	15 seats	14 seats
Seat change	0	▲2
Percentage	48.63%	47.57%
Swing	▼0.75	▲9.73
- Results of the election
Premier before election
Robert Cosgrove
Labor
Elected Premier
Robert Cosgrove
Labor

The 1950 Tasmanian state election was held on 6 May 1950 in the Australian state of Tasmania to elect 30 members of the Tasmanian House of Assembly. The election used the Hare-Clark proportional representation system — six members were elected from each of five electorates.

Following the 1948 election, Premier Robert Cosgrove and the Labor Party remained in government with the support of independent MHA Bill Wedd. At the 1950 election, Cosgrove was seeking another term in office against the opposition Liberal Party, which had replaced Neil Campbell with Rex Townley as leader in February 1950.

At the election, Labor retained 15 seats in the House of Assembly, and the Liberals regained one seat previously held by an independent, whilst Rex Townley, formerly an Independent Liberal, retained his seat as a Liberal.

== Results ==
Party	Votes	%	+/–	Seats	+/–
Labor	70,976	48.63	-0.75	15	Steady
Liberal^{[a]}	69,429	47.57	+9.73	14	▲2
Independents	5,453	3.74	-2.10	1	▼1
Communist	86	0.06	+0.06	0	Steady
Total	145,944	100.00	–	30	–
Valid votes	145,944	95.52			
Invalid/blank votes	6,841	4.48	+0.53		
Total votes	152,785	100.00	–		
Registered voters/turnout	161,650	94.52	+2.28		

Popular vote
Labor	48.63%
Liberal	47.57%
Independents	3.74%
Communist	0.06%

Seats
Labor	50.00%
Liberal	46.67%
Independents	3.33%

^{a} Rex Townley joined the Liberal Party before the election, and had a personal vote of 3.88% in 1948 (19.97% of the Denison vote), so the actual net difference in votes between 1948 and 1950 was 5.85%.

== Distribution of votes ==
=== Primary vote by division ===
	Bass	Darwin	Denison	Franklin	Wilmot
Labor Party	54.2%	52.4%	46.2%	44.5%	51.2%
Liberal Party	45.8%	46.8%	44.1%	46.8%	48.8%
Other	—	0.9%	9.6%	8.7%	—

=== Distribution of seats ===
Electorate	Seats won
Bass	
Darwin	
Denison	
Franklin	
Wilmot	

Labor
Liberal
Independent

== See also ==
- Members of the Tasmanian House of Assembly, 1950–1955
- Candidates of the 1950 Tasmanian state election
