= Neil Pitt =

Australian politician

Neil Henry Pitt (31 December 1929 – 3 May 1996) was an Australian politician. Born in Launceston, he was elected to the Tasmanian House of Assembly as a Liberal member for Bass in 1972, holding his seat until his defeat in 1976.
