= John Quintal =

Australian politician

John Moresby Quintal (2 January 1884 – 5 April 1961) was an Australian politician.

He was born in Hobart. In 1942 he was elected to the Tasmanian House of Assembly as a Labor member for Bass in a countback following Thomas Davies' death. A direct descendant of Bounty mutineer Matthew Quintal, he is believed to have been the first such person to enter an Australian parliament. He was defeated at the 1946 election. He died in Launceston.
