= George Shields (politician) =

Australian politician

George Shields (6 November 1854 – 7 May 1933) was an Australian politician.

He was born in Launceston. In 1923 he was elected to the Tasmanian House of Assembly as a Nationalist member for Bass in a recount following John Hayes' election to the Senate. He was defeated at the next election in 1925. He died in Launceston.
