= Alexander Marshall (Australian politician) =

Australian politician

Alexander Tasman Marshall (11 July 1881 – 18 November 1966) was an Australian politician. He was born in Launceston. In 1914 he was elected to the Tasmanian House of Assembly as a Liberal member for Bass. He became a Nationalist in 1917 and was Chair of Committees from 1922. Marshall was defeated in 1925. He died in Launceston in 1966.
