= James McGowen (Tasmanian politician) =

Australian politician

James Sinclair Taylor McGowen (25 October 1905 – 9 November 1994) was an Australian politician. He was a Liberal Party of Australia member of the Tasmanian House of Assembly from 1961 to 1964, representing the electorate of Bass.

McGowen was born in Newtown in Sydney and was educated at Tempe Technical School. He was the grandson of Labor Premier of New South Wales James McGowen. He moved to Launceston, Tasmania in 1938 and became a retailer there, operating a newsagency, then a clothing store and shoe store. He married Hazel Goss at St John's Church in December 1947.

McGowen was a City of Launceston councillor from 1949 to 1966 and mayor from 1958 to 1959. He also held a number of community roles, including chairman of the Launceston Hydrangea Festival and a member of the Launceston Fire Board, local ambulance board and Good Neighbour Council.

In 1961 he was elected to the Tasmanian House of Assembly as a Liberal member for Bass in a countback following Fred Marriott's resignation. He was defeated at the 1964 election. He had previously been an unsuccessful candidate for parliament four times: three times for the Liberal Party in Bass and once as an independent for the Legislative Council, and was again unsuccessful in 1968 after his 1964 defeat.

McGowen died in 1994 in Melbourne.
