= 1925 Tasmanian state election =

State election in Australia

- 3 June 1925

All 30 seats to the House of Assembly
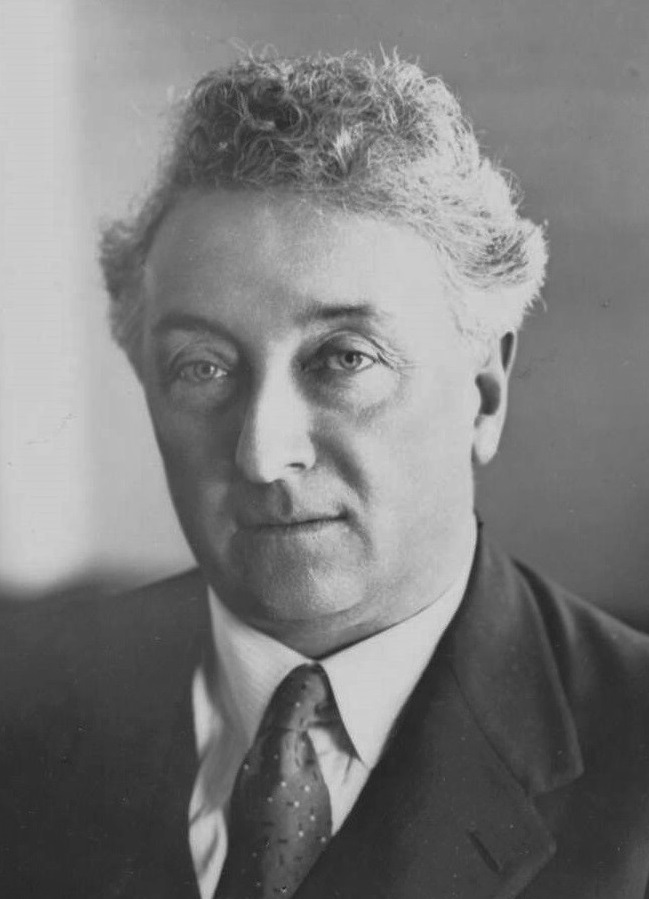

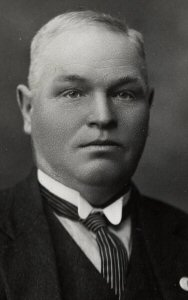

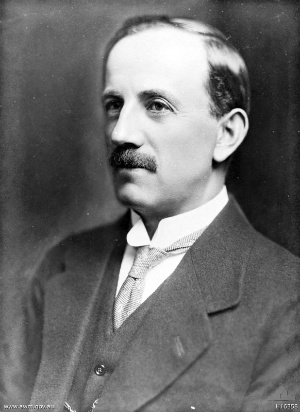
	First party	Second party	Third party
Leader	Joseph Lyons	Edward Hobbs	Walter Lee
Party	Labor	Nationalist	Liberal (Lee)
Leader since	November 1916	October 1924	October 1923
Leader's seat	Wilmot	Darwin	Wilmot
Last election	12 seats	12 seats	0 seats
Seats won	16 seats	7 seats	4 seats
Seat change	▲4	▼5	▲4
Percentage	48.47%	29.02%	10.34%
Swing	▲11.73	▼11.93	▲10.34
- Results of the election
Premier before election
Joseph Lyons
Labor
Elected Premier
Joseph Lyons
Labor

The 1925 Tasmanian state election was held on Wednesday, 3 June 1925 in the Australian state of Tasmania to elect 30 members of the Tasmanian House of Assembly. The election used the Hare-Clark proportional representation system — six members were elected from each of five electorates.

The ambiguous result of the 1922 election saw the formation of a coalition government of the Nationalist and Country parties, with John Hayes as Premier of Tasmania. Hayes and his ministry lasted only until August 1923. Tasmania had borrowed heavily during World War I, and was in a poor financial state. Calls for Hayes to resign began in mid-1923, and he did so after a meeting of dissident MHAs undermined his support. James Newton was elected Nationalist leader, but failed to achieve the required support. Walter Lee was voted leader, and became the next Premier in October 1923; and Hayes was appointed to the Australian Senate.

Lee's ministry lasted only 10 weeks and in October 1923, a small group of Nationalists revolted against Lee, and pledged support for Joseph Lyons and the opposition Labor Party. Lyons was sworn in as Premier, and was the incumbent Premier at the 1925 election. Labor won the 1925 election in a landslide – Lyons' economic improvements and diplomacy with the Nationalists made him a popular Premier.

== Results ==
Party	Votes	%	+/–	Seats	+/–
Labor	36,631	48.47	▲11.73	16	▲4
Nationalist	21,932	29.02	▼11.93	7	▼5
Liberal (Lee)	7,815	10.34	New	4	New
Independents	6,585	8.71	▲1.70	3	▲2
Independent Labor	2,604	3.45	▲2.14	0	Steady
Total	75,567	100.00	–	30	–
Valid votes	75,567	97.78			
Invalid/blank votes	1,714	2.22	▼0.41		
Total votes	77,281	100.00	–		
Registered voters/turnout	114,901	67.26	▲4.16		

Popular vote
Labor	48.47%
Nationalist	29.02%
Liberal	10.34%
Independents	12.16%

Seats
Labor	53.33%
Nationalist	23.33%
Liberal	13.33%
Independents	10.00%

== Distribution of votes ==
=== Primary vote by division ===
	Bass	Darwin	Denison	Franklin	Wilmot
Labor Party	44.0%	51.5%	49.4%	50.9%	46.1%
Nationalist	15.2%	35.6%	40.1%	25.6%	26.7%
Liberal (Lee)	29.0%	13.0%	–	–	10.6%
Other	11.8%	–	10.5%	23.5%	16.6%

=== Distribution of seats ===
Electorate	Seats won
Bass	
Darwin	
Denison	
Franklin	
Wilmot	

Labor
Nationalist
Liberal (Lee)
Independent

== See also ==
- Members of the Tasmanian House of Assembly, 1925–1928
- Candidates of the 1925 Tasmanian state election
