= John Brown (Tasmanian politician) =

Australian politician

John Harold Brown (2 June 1886 – 9 May 1974) was an Australian politician. He was born in Winkleigh, Tasmania. On 28 June 1948 he was elected to the Tasmanian House of Assembly as a Labor member for Franklin in a countback following the death of Edward Brooker. He was subsequently defeated at the state election held on 21 August. Brown's term of seven weeks is the shortest of any MHA in Tasmania's history.
