= Howard Barber =

English-born Australian politician

Howard Charles Linney Barber (1877 – 12 April 1950) was an English-born Australian politician.

He was born in Birmingham. In 1931 he was elected to the Tasmanian House of Assembly as a Nationalist member for Bass. He resigned in 1933. He died in 1950 in Mount Gambier, South Australia.
