= John Palamountain =

Australian politician

John Richard Palamountain (19 April 1866 – 30 August 1942) was an Australian politician. He was born in Ballarat, Victoria, Australia. In 1926 he was elected to the Tasmanian House of Assembly as a Labor member for Wilmot. He held the seat until his defeat in 1928. Palamountain died at Hobart in 1942.
