= John Steer (politician) =

Australian politician

John Leslie Steer

Member of the Tasmanian House of Assembly
- In office 1950–1961
- Constituency: Bass

Member of the Tasmanian House of Assembly
- In office 1964–1968

Personal details
- Born: 30 January 1919 Franklin, Tasmania, Australia
- Died: 10 October 1968 (aged 49)
- Party: Liberal Party of Australia

John Leslie Steer (30 January 1919 – 10 October 1968) was an Australian politician.

He was born in Franklin. In 1950 he was elected to the Tasmanian House of Assembly as a Liberal member for Bass. He resigned from the House in 1961 to contest the Legislative Council seat of Cornwall, but he was unsuccessful. Returning to the House in 1964, he died in office in 1968.
