= Herbert Postle =

Australian politician (1884–1961)

Herbert Thomas Postle (28 September 1884 – 24 July 1961) was an Australian politician. Born in Melbourne, he received a Bachelor of Law in 1913, a Bachelor of Arts in 1915, a Master of Law and a Master of Arts in 1917, a Diploma of Education in 1919 and a Doctorate of Law in 1920 from Melbourne University. In 1933 he was elected in a countback to the Tasmanian House of Assembly as a Nationalist member for Bass; he was defeated the following year. Postle died in Melbourne in 1961.
