= Allen Hollingsworth =

Australian politician

Allen William Hollingsworth (17 October 1894 – 3 June 1954) was an Australian politician. He was a member of the Tasmanian House of Assembly for the Nationalist Party from 9 Jun 1934 until 13 December 1941. He was an alderman of the City of Launceston, and Mayor of the city in 1933–1934, 1946 and 1950.

He was born in Buenos Aires, Argentina, the son of William Hollingsworth and his second wife, Amelia Airey. William, Amelia and their family of eight children (four daughters from William's first marriage, and one son and three daughters of their own) had left Launceston in January 1893 to join the New Australia colony in Paraguay. They sailed from Sydney on the Royal Tar, with the first group of colonists. The New Australia Colony was formally founded in Paraguay on 28 September 1893. Following the development of problems within the group of colonists, William and family left New Australia for Argentina, where he found work on the railways. Son Allen William was born in Buenos Aires on 17 October 1894, and was subsequently baptised there in the Presbyterian Church (William had been an active member of the Congregational Church in Launceston). The family was in very difficult circumstances, and funds were raised in Launceston to pay for their return. They travelled on the ship Mitredale to Newcastle, New South Wales, arriving there on 11 May 1895, and at Launceston on 27 May 1895. Allen was then aged 7 months. William resumed his trade as a blacksmith, and two more daughters were born. But both he and Amelia died young, he in 1902 and she in 1903. They left a family of six children aged 15 and under (the daughters of William's first marriage were all adults by then). Allen was only eight. The extended Airey and Hollingsworth families supported and helped raise the children. The Aireys belonged to the Methodist Church, and Allen and his sisters attended Sunday School. When he reached 14 years, Allen was apprenticed as a French polisher, a trade he followed all his working life. When war broke out in 1914, he enlisted in the AIF on 8 January 1915, and was posted to the 15th Battalion. He was with the 15th when they landed at Gallipoli on 25 April 1915, and served there throughout the campaign. After the evacuation from Gallipoli, he was transferred to the 4th Division Signals, in which he served for the rest of the war. He reached the rank of Lance-Corporal. In 1918, he was selected for early return to Australia, and arrived home on the Burmah on 19 January 1919. He resumed his trade as a French polisher in Launceston. On 29 June 1921, at West Pine, near Penguin on the North West Coast of Tasmania, he married Elizabeth Owens, the sister of one of his fellow soldiers, who had been killed at Gallipoli. The couple lived in Launceston, in Invermay, first at 11 Waugh St, and then from the 1930s in a beautiful Federation house in Mayne St, demolished when the Northern Outlet was constructed. In the 1920s, they had two sons, Owen and Leslie John, and a daughter, Margaret, who did not survive infancy. They were active in the Invermay Methodist Church, with Allen teaching Sunday School there. His sister Millie did the same at the Margaret St Methodist Church. In 1928, he stood for election as an alderman on the Launceston City Council, advertising his role as "the only returned soldier candidate". He narrowly missed election, coming in 5th for 4 positions. He was also involved with the Invermay Progress Association, especially in its campaigning for the establishment of a recreation reserve on the Mowbray Swamp. []. In 1929, he was also involved in the establishment of a Northern Branch of the League of Nations Union. [] In 1934 he was elected to the Tasmanian House of Assembly as a Nationalist member for Bass. He was defeated in 1941. He died in Hobart.
