= Fergus Medwin =

Australian politician

Fergus Michael Medwin (10 July 1874 – 25 September 1934) was an Australian Labor politician. He was born at Black River in Tasmania. In 1928 he was elected to the Tasmanian House of Assembly as a Labor member for Darwin. He resigned from the Labor Party in 1931 and lost his seat in that year's election. Medwin died in Stanley in 1934.
