= Fred Marriott (politician) =

Australian politician

Frederick Arthur Marriott (7 July 1910 – 24 September 1994) was an Australian politician.

The third son of Frank Marriott and Alice Maud née Harrison, Fred was born in Elliott. His father was a Liberal member for Bass in the Tasmanian House of Assembly. Frank retired in 1946 and Fred succeeded him as a member for Bass. Fred was Chair of Committees from 1955 to 1959. In 1961 he resigned to contest the federal seat of Bass, but was unsuccessful.

His younger brother John was a Senator for Tasmania from 1953 to 1975.
