= John Henry Cleary =

Australian politician

John Henry Cleary (2 September 1854 – 23 February 1937) was an Australian politician.

He was born on the Tasman Peninsula in Van Diemen's Land. In 1916 he was elected to the Tasmanian House of Assembly as a Labor member for Denison. He served until his defeat in 1928. Cleary died in Hobart in 1937.
