= Charles Grant (Australian politician) =

Australian politician

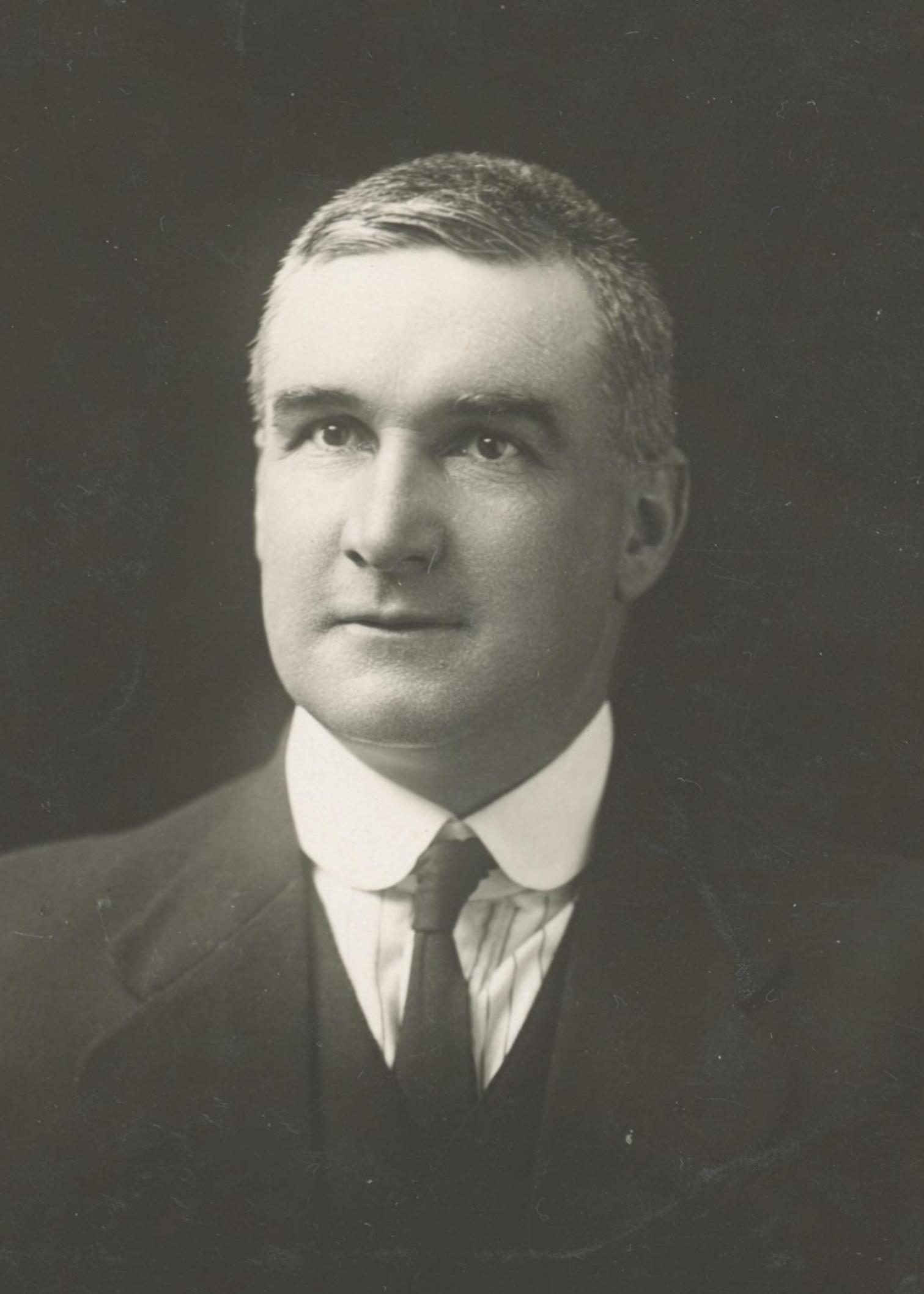

Senator for Tasmania
- In office 3 March 1932 – 30 June 1941
- Preceded by: James Ogden
- In office 29 July 1925 – 13 November 1925
- Preceded by: George Foster
- Succeeded by: Burford Sampson

Personal details
- Born: 25 April 1878 Hobart, Tasmania, Australia
- Died: 14 December 1943 (aged 65) Hobart, Tasmania, Australia
- Party: Nationalist (to 1931); UAP (from 1931)
- Spouse: Charlotte Bell (m. 1903)
- Occupation: Businessman

Charles William Grant (25 April 1878 – 14 December 1943) was an Australian businessman and politician. He was a Senator for Tasmania from 1932 to 1941, representing the United Australia Party (UAP), and also briefly filled a casual vacancy in 1925 for the Nationalist Party.

== Early life ==
Grant was born on 25 April 1878 in Hobart, Tasmania. He was one of four children born to Jane (née Nicholls) and Charles Henry Grant. His English-born father was a railway engineer and company director who was elected to the Tasmanian Legislative Council in 1892.

Grant was educated at The Hutchins School in Hobart. After leaving school he worked on sheep stations on the Australian mainland for several years before returning to Tasmania in 1901. His father died in the same year leaving an estate of £48,000 (equivalent to $8,000,000 in 2022). Grant held business interests across a range of industries, including a partnership in the Murdoch Bros produce firm. He served as chairman of the Cascade Brewery Company, the Hobart Gas Company, and motor vehicle firm Heathorn and Company, and also served on the board of directors of Davies Brothers Ltd, the parent company of The Mercury.

== State politics ==
Grant was elected to the Tasmanian House of Assembly at the 1922 state election, running as a Nationalist in the seat of Denison. In 1923 he crossed the floor to vote against Nationalist premier Walter Lee on a no-confidence motion, resulting in Australian Labor Party leader Joseph Lyons becoming premier. This contributed to his defeat at the 1925 state election.

Grant was re-elected to the House of Assembly at the 1928 state election. He was appointed as an honorary minister in the government of John McPhee and served as an advisor to McPhee on finance matters and at Loan Council meetings. Re-elected at the 1931 election, he resigned from the House of Assembly on 2 March 1932 following his election to the Senate.

== Federal politics ==
On 29 July 1925, Grant was elected by the parliament of Tasmania to fill a Senate casual vacancy caused by the resignation of George Foster. He defeated Walter Lee in the ballot for the vacancy. Grant's first stint in the Senate was short, as he was defeated for re-election on the Nationalist ticket at the 1925 federal election. In accordance with the constitutional provisions at the time, his term ended immediately on the date of the election.

Grant was re-elected to the Senate on 3 March 1932, filling another casual vacancy caused by the death of James Ogden. He again defeated Lee in the ballot. He joined the United Australia Party, which had replaced the Nationalist Party, and was elected to a full six-year term at the 1934 federal election. He did not seek re-election in 1940 with his term expiring on 30 June 1941.

In the Senate, Grant was a strong advocate for Tasmania. He was the only Tasmanian senator to vote against the Lyons government's Financial Agreements Enforcement Bill, which had been designed to target the New South Wales state government but was opposed by the Tasmanian state government. He was also critical of the impact of the Navigation Act on shipping across the Bass Strait and believed the Commonwealth Grants Commission could be replaced by direct grants to Tasmania. Grant also spoke regularly on financial and economic matters. He argued for reduced government spending and a decrease in the powers of the Commonwealth government.

== Personal life ==
In 1903, Grant married Charlotte Bell, with whom he had four children. He was widowed in 1938 and died on 14 December 1943 in the same house on Davey Street, Hobart, that he had been born in.
