= Robert Murphy (Australian politician) =

Australian politician (1876–1966)

Robert Murphy (8 July 1876 – 27 May 1966) was an Australian politician.

He was born in Scottsdale. In 1931 he was elected to the Tasmanian House of Assembly as a Nationalist member for Bass. He held the seat until his defeat in 1934. He died in Launceston.
