= James Newton (Tasmanian politician) =

Australian politician

James Corcoran Newton (1864 – 13 March 1929) was an Australian politician.

Newton was born in Victoria. He was elected in 1917 to the Tasmanian House of Assembly at a by-election as a Nationalist member for Bass. From November 1923 to October 1924 he was leader of the Nationalists and Leader of the Opposition. In 1925, he joined Walter Lee's breakaway Liberal faction. He retired from politics on 30 May 1928 and died in Launceston the following year.
