= James Belton =

Australian politician

Caricature by David Low

James Belton (1855 – 12 June 1935) was an Australian politician. He was born in Talbot, Victoria. In 1909 he was elected to the Tasmanian House of Assembly as a Labor member for Darwin. He was a minister from 1914 to 1916, but resigned to run (unsuccessfully) for the Senate in 1917. He was re-elected in a by-election in July of that year and served until his defeat in 1931. Belton died in 1935 at Wynyard.
