= Henry Thomson (Australian politician) =

Australian politician

Henry Mangles Denham Thomson (28 April 1872 – 29 August 1947) was an Australian politician.

He was born at "Cormiston", a farm in Launceston. In 1925 he was elected to the Tasmanian House of Assembly as a Nationalist member for Bass. He held the seat until his defeat in 1931. He died in Sydney.
