= John Madden (Tasmanian politician) =

Australian politician

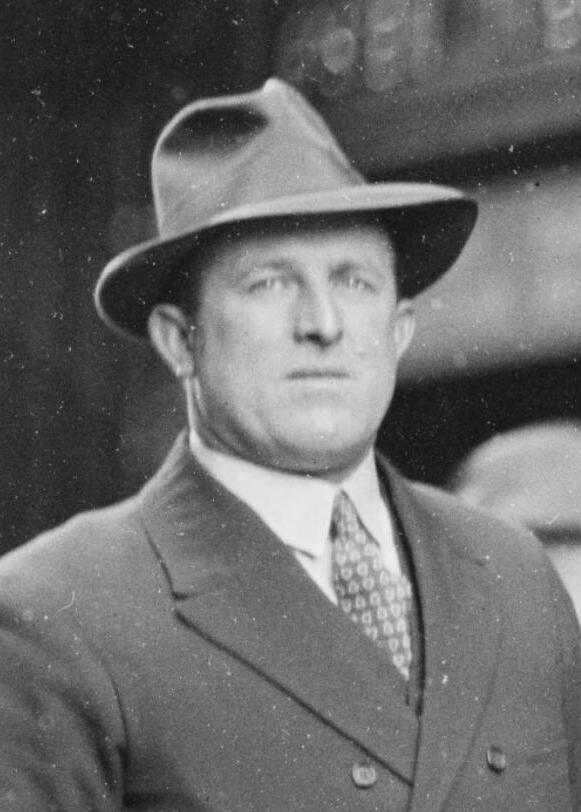
Madden in 1933

John Lewis Madden (8 July 1896 – 16 July 1971) was an Australian politician.

He was born in Launceston to Maria Josephine Conole and James Joeseph. He went to St. Mary's Convent School in his hometown of Launceston, and eventually went to Christian Brothers’ College which was located at the city of Adelaide. There he be certified in electrical engineering. He married his wife Annie May Peterson in 1922, and eventually had 3 kids, two daughters and a son.

Back in Launceston, he came to work for the Launceston City Council Tramway Workshops, where he was both an Industrial Inspector and Determinations Inspector from 1933 or 34 to 1936. In 1936 he was elected to the Tasmanian House of Assembly as a Labor member for Bass in a recount following the death of Victor Shaw. He was defeated in 1956, but returned to the House in 1957 in another recount following Claude Barnard's death. He was Speaker of the House from 25 June 1964 to 9 May 1969, when he retired from politics. He died in Launceston.
