= John Piggott (politician) =

Australian politician

John Peters Piggott (19 October 1879 – 3 August 1957) was an Australian politician.

He was born in Hobart. In 1922 he was elected to the Tasmanian House of Assembly as a Country Party member for Franklin. Shortly after parliament sat, however, he became an independent. He joined the Nationalist Party in 1928 and was appointed Chair of Committees, but he was defeated in 1931.
