= Edward Brooker =

Australian politician (1891–1948)

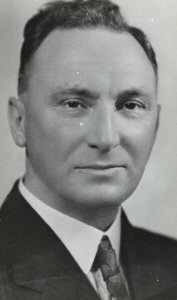

31st Premier of Tasmania
- In office 19 December 1947 – 24 February 1948
- Preceded by: Robert Cosgrove
- Succeeded by: Robert Cosgrove
- Constituency: Franklin

Personal details
- Born: 4 January 1891 London, England, UK
- Died: 18 June 1948 (aged 57) Montrose, Tasmania, Australia
- Party: Labor Party
- Spouse: Lydia Grace Minnie Wilson

William Edward Brooker (4 January 1891 – 18 June 1948) was a Labor Party politician. He became the interim Premier of Tasmania on 19 December 1947 while Robert Cosgrove was facing corruption charges. He died on 18 June 1948, shortly after returning the premiership to Cosgrove on 24 February 1948.

== Early life and military service ==
Brooker was born in Hendon, a suburb of London, and was educated at Enfield Grammar School. He began working as a clerk for the Asiatic Petroleum Company, and later managed his father's business.

Brooker was a member of the Territorial Force, the volunteer component of the British Army, and a precursor to the Territorial Army. During World War I he served with the Royal Army Medical Corps in Gallipoli, Thessaloniki and Palestine.

Leaving the army as a sergeant in 1919, Brooker married Lydia Wilson in London, and in 1921 was tempted by the offer of free passage to Australia. Brooker, his wife and their baby arrived in Melbourne on 31 August 1921, and moved to Tasmania where he worked as a farm labourer, then as a pipe-fitter at the Cadbury's Chocolate Factory in Claremont.

== Political career ==
As a fitter, Brooker was a member of the Australian branch of the Amalgamated Engineering Union, and joined the Labor Party, unsuccessfully running for the electorate of Franklin in the Tasmanian House of Assembly. Inspired by Major C. H. Douglas' Social Credit movement, Brooker ran for Franklin again in 1934 and won, becoming an MHA on 9 June 1934. In the House of Assembly, he served as Government Whip (1936–1939) until joining the cabinet of Robert Cosgrove as Minister for Transport (1939–42), Chief Secretary (1939–43) and Minister for Tourism (1942–43). In November 1943, he was made Minister for Land and Works, and in 1946, the portfolio of Post-War Reconstruction.

In December 1947, the Premier Robert Cosgrove was indicted on charges of bribery and corruption. Cosgrove stood down as Premier during his trial, and Brooker was sworn in as his replacement on 19 December 1947. The trial was concluded by February the next year, and the charges against Cosgrove were dropped. Brooker stood down after only two months as Premier, and Cosgrove was reinstated, appointing Brooker as Treasurer and Minister for Transport. Four months after resigning the Premiership, Brooker died at his home in Montrose after suffering a pulmonary oedema on 18 June 1948.

== Legacy ==
The Hobart highway known as the Northern Outlet, the idea of which was conceived by Brooker as transport minister, was renamed the Brooker Highway in his honour.

Political offices
Preceded by Robert Cosgrove	Premier of Tasmania; 1947–1948	Succeeded by Robert Cosgrove
