= Claude James =

Australian politician

Sir Claude Ernest Weymouth James (24 February 1878 – 27 August 1961) was an Australian politician.

He was born in Launceston. In 1925 he was elected to the Tasmanian House of Assembly seat of Bass, initially as a member of Walter Lee's "Liberal" grouping. By 1928 he had joined the Nationalist Party. He served a period as a minister. In 1937 he retired from the House, becoming Tasmania's Agent-General in London, a position he held until 1950. He was knighted in 1941, and died in Launceston.
