= Edward Hobbs =

Australian politician

Edward Hobbs (25 November 1868 – 20 July 1936) was an Australian politician.

He was born in Hampshire in England. In 1916 he was elected to the Tasmanian House of Assembly as a Nationalist member for Darwin. He joined the Country Party in 1922 and from October to November 1923 served as temporary Opposition Leader, a position he held again from October 1924 to July 1925. In 1925 he became a member of Walter Lee's "Liberal" grouping in parliament, before eventually rejoining the Nationalists. Hobbs was defeated in 1934 and died in Ulverstone in 1936.
