= Henry McFie =

Australian politician

Henry Hector McFie OBE (21 October 1869 – 2 January 1957) was an Australian politician. Born in Hobart, Tasmania, he was originally a member of the Labor Party but joined the Nationalist Party after the 1916 split over conscription. He was elected to the Tasmanian House of Assembly in 1925 as a Nationalist member for Darwin. He served until his defeat in 1934. Re-elected in 1941, he joined the Liberal Party in 1945 and retired in 1948.
