= Victor Shaw =

Australian politician

Victor James Shaw (10 March 1875 – 14 June 1936) was an Australian politician.

He was born in Cressy. In 1925 he was elected to the Tasmanian House of Assembly as a Labor member for Bass. He was appointed Labor whip in 1929. He held the seat until his death in 1936.
