= George Becker (politician) =

Australian politician (1877–1941)

George Godfrey Becker (26 July 1877 – 23 April 1941) was an Australian politician. He was born in Brighton, Tasmania. In 1912 he was elected to the Tasmanian House of Assembly as a Labor member for Bass. He served as a minister from 1925 to 1928 but was defeated in 1931. In 1934 he was re-elected as an Independent Labor member for Wilmot, rejoining the party in 1937. He died in office in 1941.
