= John Ockerby =

Australian politician

John Featherstone Ockerby (1864 – 1 July 1951) was an Australian politician. He was born in Dewsbury in Yorkshire. He was Mayor of Launceston in Tasmania in 1925 and 1939. In 1928 he was elected to the Tasmanian House of Assembly as a Nationalist member for Bass, serving until his defeat in 1946. Ockerby died in Launceston in 1951.
