= Thomas Davies (Australian politician) =

Australian politician (1881–1942)

Thomas Henry Davies DSO MC (30 October 1881 – 11 September 1942) was an Australian politician.

He was born in Beaconsfield. A decorated World War I veteran, he was first elected to the Tasmanian House of Assembly in 1929 as a Labor member for Bass at a by-election following Allan Guy's move to federal politics. He served as a minister from 1934 until his death in 1942 in George Town.

Davies' initial election to the House of Assembly in 1929 occurred under unusual circumstances. The relevant ballot papers for Bass from the 1928 state election had been destroyed in a flood, meaning the standard recount procedure for Guy's replacement (which should have elected Davies) could not be conducted. Instead, a by-election was mandated by Tasmanian electoral law. The Nationalist Party opted not to contest the by-election in the interests of fairness, allowing Davies to be declared elected unopposed.
