= Philip Kelly (Australian politician) =

Australian politician

Philip Louis Kelly (9 September 1886 – 30 March 1954) was an Australian politician.

He was born at Deloraine in Tasmania. In 1922 he was elected to the Tasmanian House of Assembly as a Labor member for Darwin in a recount following James Ogden's resignation. In 1934 he was appointed Chair of Committees, a position he held until his defeat in 1946. Kelly died in Ulverstone in 1954.
