= Frank Marriott =

English-born Australian politician

Francis Marriott (11 July 1874 – 9 February 1957) was an English-born Australian politician.

He was born in London. He lost his sight fighting in World War I. In 1922, having moved to Australia, he was elected to the Tasmanian House of Assembly as a Nationalist member for Darwin. His wife Alice would read bills aloud to him, although he had learned braille. He was Chair of Committees from 1922 to 1925. In 1941 he moved to the seat of Bass, which he represented until he retired in 1946.

He was succeeded by his third son, Fred. His fourth and youngest son John was a Senator for Tasmania.

Marriott was made a Companion of the Order of St Michael & St George (CMG) in 1934.

He died in Hobart on 9 February 1957 (aged 80).
