= Neil Campbell (politician) =

Australian politician

Neil Campbell (21 March 1880 – 25 April 1960) was an Australian politician.

He was born in Winkleigh, Tasmania. In 1922 he was elected to the Tasmanian House of Assembly as a Nationalist member for Wilmot. He was Chair of Committees from 1931 to 1934, when he briefly became a minister. From 1945 to 1950 he served as Leader of the Opposition. He resigned from the House of Assembly in 1955 to contest Tamar in the Legislative Council, which he represented until his death in 1960 in Launceston.

Parliament of Tasmania
Preceded by Henry Baker	Leader of the Opposition; 1945–1950	Succeeded by Rex Townley
Preceded by Arthur Cutts	Member for Tamar; 1955–1960	Succeeded by Daniel Hitchcock
