= Results of the 1919 Tasmanian state election =

Tasmanian state election, 31 May 1919 House of Assembly << 1916–1922 >>
Enrolled voters	107,541				
Votes cast	71,064		Turnout	66.08%	–7.52%
Informal votes	2,814		Informal	3.96%	-1.70%
Summary of votes by party
Party	Primary votes	%	Swing	Seats	Change
Nationalist	37,677	55.20%	+6.97%	16	+ 1
Labor	28,286	41.44%	–7.03%	13	– 1
Independent	2,289	3.35%	+0.05%	1	± 0
Total	68,250			30	

This is a list of House of Assembly results for the 1919 Tasmanian election.

== Results by division ==
=== Bass ===
1919 Tasmanian state election: Bass
Party	Candidate	Votes	%	±%
Quota		1,954		
Nationalist	James Newton (elected 1)	2,367	17.3	+11.8
Nationalist	Alexander Marshall (elected 2)	2,280	16.7	−3.0
Nationalist	John Hayes (elected 3)	2,233	16.3	+5.7
Nationalist	Robert Sadler (elected 5)	1,610	11.8	+2.8
Labor	George Becker (elected 4)	1,986	14.5	−1.3
Labor	Allan Guy (elected 6)	1,297	9.5	0.0
Labor	Victor Shaw	915	6.7	+6.7
Labor	William Bowen	535	3.9	+3.9
Labor	Henry Sharpe	449	3.3	+3.3
Total formal votes		13,672	96.7	+1.0
Informal votes		471	3.3	−1.0
Turnout		14,143	63.2	−8.5
Party total votes
Nationalist		8,490	62.1	+16.8
Labor		5,182	37.9	−15.3

=== Darwin ===
1919 Tasmanian state election: Darwin
Party	Candidate	Votes	%	±%
Quota		1,718		
Labor	James Ogden (elected 2)	1,805	15.0	−1.4
Labor	James Belton (elected 4)	1,450	12.1	−7.2
Labor	James Hurst (elected 5)	1,268	10.5	+10.5
Labor	George Phillips	531	4.4	+4.4
Labor	Leonard Bennett	521	4.3	−2.9
Labor	Leonard Burrows	130	1.1	+1.1
Nationalist	Edward Hobbs (elected 3)	1,751	14.6	+3.1
Nationalist	Herbert Payne (elected 6)	1,464	12.2	+0.6
Nationalist	Percy Pollard	1,260	9.3	+9.3
Independent	Joshua Whitsitt (elected 1)	1,841	15.3	+4.7
Total formal votes		12,021	95.2	+1.5
Informal votes		604	4.8	−1.5
Turnout		12,625	67.9	−6.0
Party total votes
Labor		5,705	47.5	−3.2
Nationalist		4,475	37.2	−1.5
Independent	Joshua Whitsitt	1,841	15.3	+4.7

=== Denison ===
1919 Tasmanian state election: Denison
Party	Candidate	Votes	%	±%
Quota		2,491		
Nationalist	Elliot Lewis (elected 2)	2,564	14.7	−1.2
Nationalist	John McPhee (elected 3)	2,316	13.3	+2.7
Nationalist	Duncan McRae	1,225	7.0	+7.0
Nationalist	George Foster	1,151	6.6	+6.6
Nationalist	Robert Snowden (elected 6)	1,086	6.2	+6.2
Nationalist	Charles Hoggins	937	5.4	+5.4
Nationalist	William Bottrill	424	2.4	+2.4
Labor	John Cleary (elected 1)	3,751	21.5	+7.0
Labor	William Sheridan (elected 4)	1,085	6.2	−13.4
Labor	Robert Cosgrove (elected 5)	846	4.9	+0.3
Labor	Walter Woods	809	4.6	−8.3
Labor	Abraham Needham	801	4.6	+4.6
Labor	John Lewis	439	2.5	−3.0
Total formal votes		17,434	97.0	+2.6
Informal votes		543	3.0	−2.6
Turnout		17,977	70.2	−4.7
Party total votes
Nationalist		9,703	55.7	+5.3
Labor		7,731	44.3	−5.3

=== Franklin ===
1919 Tasmanian state election: Franklin
Party	Candidate	Votes	%	±%
Quota		2,026		
Nationalist	John Evans (elected 4)	1,574	11.1	−3.7
Nationalist	George Cummins	1,317	9.3	+9.3
Nationalist	William Dixon (elected 6)	1,102	7.8	+7.8
Nationalist	Alexander Hean (elected 5)	1,081	7.6	−2.6
Nationalist	Arthur Cotton	983	6.9	−1.4
Nationalist	Arthur Morrisby	589	4.2	+4.2
Nationalist	Frank Rathbone	378	2.7	+2.7
Nationalist	Richard Johnson	182	1.3	+1.3
Nationalist	Francis Hyndes	161	1.1	+1.1
Labor	David Dicker (elected 1)	3,037	21.4	+12.7
Labor	Albert Ogilvie (elected 2)	938	6.6	+6.6
Labor	Benjamin Watkins (elected 3)	585	4.1	+4.1
Labor	Thomas Keogh	533	3.8	+3.8
Labor	William Shoobridge	489	3.4	−5.4
Labor	Will Reece	426	3.0	+3.0
Labor	William Pearce	354	2.5	+2.5
Independent	Nicholas Brooks	448	3.2	+3.2
Total formal votes		14,177	96.7	+3.3
Informal votes		490	3.3	−3.3
Turnout		14,667	65.1	−9.1
Party total votes
Nationalist		7,367	52.0	+0.2
Labor		6,362	44.9	−3.3
Independent	Nicholas Brooks	448	3.2	+3.2

=== Wilmot ===
1919 Tasmanian state election: Wilmot
Party	Candidate	Votes	%	±%
Quota		1,564		
Nationalist	Walter Lee (elected 1)	2,775	25.3	+5.0
Nationalist	Ernest Blyth (elected 3)	1,668	15.2	+3.8
Nationalist	Herbert Hays (elected 4)	973	8.9	+1.5
Nationalist	George Pullen (elected 6)	895	8.2	+8.2
Nationalist	Henry McFie	531	4.9	+4.9
Nationalist	Frank Rose	505	4.6	+4.6
Nationalist	William Connell	293	2.7	+0.5
Labor	Joseph Lyons (elected 2)	1,892	17.3	−4.4
Labor	Michael O'Keefe (elected 5)	720	6.6	−3.0
Labor	Sidney Foskett	352	3.2	+3.2
Labor	Christopher Sheedy	342	3.1	+3.1
Total formal votes		10,946	93.9	−0.3
Informal votes		706	6.1	+0.3
Turnout		11,652	63.2	−9.9
Party total votes
Nationalist		7,640	69.8	+15.1
Labor		3,306	30.2	−8.9

== See also ==
- 1919 Tasmanian state election
- Members of the Tasmanian House of Assembly, 1919–1922
- Candidates of the 1919 Tasmanian state election
