= Results of the 1922 Tasmanian state election =

Tasmanian state election, 10 June 1922 House of Assembly << 1919–1925 >>
Enrolled voters	110,549				
Votes cast	69,752		Turnout	63.10%	–2.98%
Informal votes	1,834		Informal	2.63%	-1.33%
Summary of votes by party
Party	Primary votes	%	Swing	Seats	Change
Nationalist	27,816	40.96%	–14.25%	12	– 4
Labor	24,956	36.74%	–4.70%	12	– 1
Country	9,498	13.98%	+13.98%	5	+ 5
Independent Labor	889	1.31%	+1.31%	0	± 0
Independent	4,759	7.01%	+3.65%	1	± 0
Total	67,918			30	

This is a list of House of Assembly results for the 1922 Tasmanian election.

== Results by division ==
=== Bass ===
1922 Tasmanian state election: Bass
Party	Candidate	Votes	%	±%
Quota		2,003		
Nationalist	John Hayes (elected 3)	1,783	12.7	−3.6
Nationalist	John Newton (elected 4)	1,631	11.6	−5.7
Nationalist	Alexander Marshall (elected 5)	1,173	8.4	−8.3
Nationalist	Henry Thomson	1,134	8.1	+8.1
Nationalist	George Shields	687	4.9	+4.9
Nationalist	William Rose	50	0.4	+0.4
Labor	Allan Guy (elected 1)	1,941	13.8	+4.5
Labor	George Becker (elected 2)	1,820	13.0	−1.5
Labor	Victor Shaw	749	5.3	−1.4
Labor	Alfred Higgins	670	4.8	+4.8
Labor	Leonard Bennett	364	2.6	+2.6
Independent	Jens Jensen (elected 6)	1,158	8.3	+8.3
Country	Robert Murphy	859	6.1	+6.1
Total formal votes		14,019	97.9	+1.2
Informal votes		294	2.1	−1.2
Turnout		14,313	61.3	−1.9
Party total votes
Nationalist		6,458	46.1	−16.0
Labor		5,544	39.5	+1.6
Independent	Jens Jensen	1,158	8.3	+8.3
Country		859	6.1	+6.1

=== Darwin ===
1922 Tasmanian state election: Darwin
Party	Candidate	Votes	%	±%
Quota		1,535		
Labor	James Ogden (elected 1)	2,004	18.7	+3.7
Labor	James Belton (elected 2)	1,149	10.7	−1.4
Labor	James Hurst (elected 6)	787	7.3	−3.2
Labor	Philip Kelly	736	6.9	+6.9
Country	Edward Hobbs (elected 5)	919	8.6	+8.6
Country	Richard Franks (elected 3)	882	8.2	+8.2
Country	Charles Dunning	682	6.3	+6.3
Country	John Wright	592	5.5	+5.5
Nationalist	Frank Marriott (elected 4)	967	9.0	+9.0
Nationalist	Percy Pollard	950	8.8	−2.9
Independent	Joshua Whitsitt	962	9.0	−6.3
Independent	Llewellyn Storey	109	1.0	+1.0
Total formal votes		10,739	97.4	+2.2
Informal votes		282	2.6	−2.2
Turnout		11,021	63.0	−4.9
Party total votes
Labor		4,676	43.5	−4.0
Country		3,075	28.6	+28.6
Nationalist		1,917	17.9	−19.3
Independent	Joshua Whitsitt	962	9.0	−6.3
Independent	Llewellyn Storey	109	1.0	+1.0

=== Denison ===
1922 Tasmanian state election: Denison
Party	Candidate	Votes	%	±%
Quota		2,625		
Nationalist	John McPhee (elected 1)	2,568	14.0	+0.7
Nationalist	Charles Grant (elected 5)	1,729	9.4	+9.4
Nationalist	Robert Snowden (elected 4)	1,368	7.4	+1.2
Nationalist	William Mulcahy	1,229	6.7	+6.7
Nationalist	John Turner	1,172	6.4	+6.4
Nationalist	Leslie Payne	496	2.7	+2.7
Nationalist	Eric Stopp	372	2.0	+2.0
Nationalist	Albert Richardson	266	1.4	+1.4
Nationalist	Edward James	199	1.1	+1.1
Nationalist	Francis O. Foster	188	1.0	+1.0
Nationalist	Joseph Hatch	32	0.2	+0.2
Labor	John Cleary (elected 2)	2,510	13.7	−7.8
Labor	Charles Culley (elected 3)	1,659	9.0	+9.0
Labor	William Sheridan (elected 6)	1,474	8.0	+1.8
Labor	Robert Cosgrove	1,388	7.6	+2.7
Labor	Will Reece	266	1.4	+1.4
Independent	Edith Waterworth	1,187	6.5	+6.5
Independent	Alicia O'Shea Petersen	105	0.6	+0.6
Independent	William Lloyd	84	0.5	+0.5
Independent	William Michael	77	0.4	+0.4
Total formal votes		18,369	97.4	+0.4
Informal votes		487	2.6	−0.4
Turnout		18,856	66.2	+4.0
Party total votes
Nationalist		9,619	52.4	−3.3
Labor		7,297	39.7	−4.6
Independent	Edith Waterworth	1,187	6.5	+6.5
Independent	Alicia O'Shea Petersen	105	0.6	+0.6
Independent	William Lloyd	84	0.5	+0.5
Independent	William Michael	77	0.4	+0.4

=== Franklin ===
1922 Tasmanian state election: Franklin
Party	Candidate	Votes	%	±%
Quota		1,932		
Nationalist	John Evans (elected 3)	1,569	11.6	+0.5
Nationalist	Alexander Hean (elected 4)	1,224	9.0	+1.4
Nationalist	George Cummins	1,089	8.1	−1.2
Nationalist	Peter Murdoch (elected 5)	955	7.1	+7.1
Nationalist	Arthur Sibley	309	2.3	+2.3
Labor	Albert Ogilvie (elected 1)	1,839	13.6	+7.0
Labor	William Pearce (elected 6)	1,083	8.0	+5.5
Labor	Benjamin Watkins	551	4.1	0.0
Labor	William Shoobridge	462	3.4	0.0
Labor	J. J. Kenneally	415	3.1	+3.1
Country	John Piggott (elected 2)	1,200	8.9	+8.9
Country	Benjamin Pearsall	742	5.5	+5.5
Country	William Dixon	636	4.7	+4.7
Country	John Newman	461	3.4	+3.4
Independent Labor	David Dicker	754	5.6	+5.6
Independent Labor	Thomas Keogh	135	1.0	+1.0
Independent	Thomas O'Brien	94	0.7	+0.7
Total formal votes		13,518	97.1	+0.4
Informal votes		398	2.9	−0.4
Turnout		13,916	60.9	−4.2
Party total votes
Nationalist		5,146	38.1	−13.9
Labor		4,350	32.2	−12.7
Country		3,039	22.5	+22.5
Independent Labor		889	7.3	+7.3
Independent	Thomas O'Brien	94	0.7	+0.7

=== Wilmot ===
1922 Tasmanian state election: Wilmot
Party	Candidate	Votes	%	±%
Quota		1,611		
Nationalist	Walter Lee (elected 2)	1,398	12.4	−13.0
Nationalist	Henry McFie	916	8.1	+3.2
Nationalist	Neil Campbell (elected 5)	864	7.7	+7.7
Nationalist	George Pullen	587	5.2	−3.0
Labor	Joseph Lyons (elected 1)	1,997	17.7	+0.5
Labor	Michael O'Keefe (elected 6)	880	7.8	+1.2
Labor	Francis Masters	212	1.9	+1.9
Country	Albert Bendall (elected 4)	1,107	9.8	+9.8
Country	Ernest Blyth (elected 3)	987	8.8	+8.8
Country	Walter Gowans	237	2.1	+2.1
Country	Arthur Lade	194	1.7	+1.7
Independent	Norman Cameron	951	8.4	+8.4
Independent	Annette Youl	358	3.2	+3.2
Independent	Frederick Bottomley	32	0.3	+0.3
Total formal votes		11,273	96.8	+2.9
Informal votes		373	3.2	−2.9
Turnout		11,646	63.5	+0.3
Party total votes
Nationalist		4,318	38.3	−31.5
Labor		3,089	27.4	−2.8
Country		2,525	22.4	+22.4
Independent	Norman Cameron	951	8.4	+8.4
Independent	Annette Youl	358	3.2	+3.2
Independent	Frederick Bottomley	32	0.3	+0.3

== See also ==
- 1922 Tasmanian state election
- Members of the Tasmanian House of Assembly, 1922–1925
- Candidates of the 1922 Tasmanian state election
