= Candidates of the 1922 Tasmanian state election =

The 1922 Tasmanian state election was held on 10 June 1922. Since the last election, the Country Party had formed and counted a number of Nationalist MHAs among its members.

== Retiring Members ==
=== Nationalist ===
- Sir Elliott Lewis MHA (Denison)
- Robert Sadler MHA (Bass)

== House of Assembly ==
Sitting members are shown in bold text. Tickets that elected at least one MHA are highlighted in the relevant colour. Successful candidates are indicated by an asterisk (*).

=== Bass ===
Six seats were up for election. The Labor Party was defending two seats. The Nationalist Party was defending four seats.

| Labor candidates | Nationalist candidates | Country candidates | Independent candidates |
|---|---|---|---|
| **George Becker***; Leonard Bennett; **Allan Guy***; Alfred Higgins; Victor Shaw | **John Hayes***; **Alexander Marshall***; **James Newton***; William Rose; George Shields; Henry Thomson | Robert Murphy | Jens Jensen* |

=== Darwin ===
Six seats were up for election. The Labor Party was defending three seats. The Nationalist Party was defending two seats, although Edward Hobbs was running for the Country Party. Independent MHA Joshua Whitsitt was defending one seat.

| Labor candidates | Nationalist candidates | Country candidates | Independent candidates |
|---|---|---|---|
| **James Belton***; **James Hurst***; Philip Kelly; **James Ogden*** | Frank Marriott*; **Percy Pollard** | Charles Dunning; Richard Franks*; **Edward Hobbs***; John Wright | Llewellyn Story; **Joshua Whitsitt** |

=== Denison ===
Six seats were up for election. The Labor Party was defending three seats. The Nationalist Party was defending three seats.

| Labor candidates | Nationalist candidates | Independent candidates |
|---|---|---|
| **John Cleary***; **Robert Cosgrove**; Charles Culley*; Will Reece; **William Sheridan*** | Francis Foster; Charles Grant*; Joseph Hatch; Edward James; **John McPhee***; William Mulcahy; Leslie Payne; Albert Richardson; **Robert Snowden***; Eric Stopp; John Turner | William Lloyd; William Michael; Alicia O'Shea Petersen; Edith Waterworth |

=== Franklin ===
Six seats were up for election. The Labor Party was defending three seats, although David Dicker was running as an independent. The Nationalist Party was defending three seats, although William Dixon was running for the Country Party.

| Labor candidates | Nationalist candidates | Country candidates | Independent candidates |
|---|---|---|---|
| James Kenneally; **Albert Ogilvie***; William Pearce*; William Shoobridge; **Benjamin Watkins** | George Cummins; **John Evans***; **Alexander Hean***; Peter Murdoch*; Arthur Sibley | **William Dixon**; John Newman; Benjamin Pearsall; John Piggott* | **David Dicker** (Ind Lab); Thomas Keogh (Ind Lab); Thomas O'Brien |

=== Wilmot ===
Six seats were up for election. The Labor Party was defending two seats. The Nationalist Party was defending four seats, although Ernest Blyth was running for the Country Party.

| Labor candidates | Nationalist candidates | Country candidates | Independent candidates |
|---|---|---|---|
| **Joseph Lyons***; F A Masters; **Michael O'Keefe*** | Neil Campbell*; **Herbert Hays**; **Sir Walter Lee***; Henry McFie; **George Pullen** | Albert Bendall*; **Ernest Blyth***; Walter Gowans; Arthur Lade | F Bottomley; Norman Cameron; Annette Youl |

== See also ==
- Members of the Tasmanian House of Assembly, 1919–1922
- Members of the Tasmanian House of Assembly, 1922–1925
