= Candidates of the 1919 Tasmanian state election =

The 1919 Tasmanian state election was held on 31 May 1919. Since the previous election, the Liberal Party had absorbed conscriptionist Labor defectors to become the Nationalist Party.

== Retiring Members ==
=== Nationalist ===
- Frederick Bunbury MHA (Franklin)
- W llamo Fullerton MHA (Denison)

== House of Assembly ==
Sitting members are shown in bold text. Tickets that elected at least one MHA are highlighted in the relevant colour. Successful candidates are indicated by an asterisk (*).

=== Bass ===
Six seats were up for election. The Labor Party was defending two seats. The Nationalist Party was defending four seats.

Labor candidates	Nationalist candidates
**George Becker***; William Bowen; **Allan Guy***; Henry Sharpe; Victor Shaw	**John Hayes***; **Alexander Marshall***; **James Newton***; **Robert Sadler***

=== Darwin ===
Six seats were up for election. The Labor Party was defending two seats. The Nationalist Party was defending three seats. Independent MHA Joshua Whitsitt was defending one seat.

Labor candidates	Nationalist candidates	Independent candidates
**James Belton***; Leonard Bennett; Leopold Burrows; James Hurst*; **James Ogden***; George Phillips	**Edward Hobbs***; **Herbert Payne***; **Percy Pollard**	**Joshua Whitsitt***

=== Denison ===
Six seats were up for election. The Labor Party was defending two seats. The Nationalist Party was defending four seats.

Labor candidates	Nationalist candidates
**John Cleary***; Robert Cosgrove*; John Lewis; Abraham Needham; **William Sheridan***; Walter Woods	William Bottrill; **George Foster**; **Charles Hoggins**; **Sir Elliott Lewis***; John McPhee*; Duncan McRae; Robert Snowden*

=== Franklin ===
Six seats were up for election. The Labor Party was defending two seats. The Nationalist Party was defending four seats.

Labor candidates	Nationalist candidates	Independent candidates
**David Dicker***; Thomas Keogh; Albert Ogilvie*; William Pearce; Will Reece; **William Shoobridge**; Benjamin Watkins*	**Arthur Cotton**; George Cummins; William Dixon*; **John Evans***; **Alexander Hean***; Francis Hyndes; Richard Johnson; Arthur Morrisby; Frank Rathbone	Nicholas Brooks

=== Wilmot ===
Six seats were up for election. The Labor Party was defending two seats. The Nationalist Party was defending four seats.

Labor candidates	Nationalist candidates
Sidney Foskett; **Joseph Lyons***; **Michael O'Keefe***; Christopher Sheedy	**Ernest Blyth***; **William Connell**; **Herbert Hays***; **Walter Lee***; Henry McFie; George Pullen*; Frank Rose

== See also ==
- Members of the Tasmanian House of Assembly, 1916–1919
- Members of the Tasmanian House of Assembly, 1919–1922
