= Results of the 1916 Tasmanian state election (House of Assembly) =

Tasmanian state election, 23 March 1916 House of Assembly << 1913–1919 >>
Enrolled voters	107,321				
Votes cast	78,984		Turnout	73.60%	+6.35%
Informal votes	4,470		Informal	5.66%	+2.79%
Summary of votes by party
Party	Primary votes	%	Swing	Seats	Change
Liberal	35,939	48.23%	–4.35%	15	+ 1
Labor	36,118	48.47%	+2.47%	14	– 1
Independent	2,457	3.30%	+1.88%	1	± 0
Total	74,514			30	

This is a list of House of Assembly results for the 1916 Tasmanian election.

== Results by division ==
=== Bass ===
1916 Tasmanian state election: Bass
Party	Candidate	Votes	%	±%
Quota		2,250		
Labor	George Becker (elected 2)	2,480	15.8	+1.0
Labor	Charles Howroyd (elected 3)	2,199	14.0	+1.0
Labor	Allan Guy (elected 6)	1,495	9.5	+1.3
Labor	James McDonald	1,239	7.9	+7.9
Labor	William Sheehan	970	6.2	+6.2
Liberal	Alexander Marshall (elected 1)	3,101	19.7	+19.7
Liberal	John Hayes (elected 4)	1,663	10.6	−1.3
Liberal	Robert Sadler (elected 5)	1,501	9.5	+1.3
Liberal	James Newton	869	5.5	+5.5
Independent	Richard Russell	229	1.5	+1.5
Total formal votes		15,746	95.7	−1.8
Informal votes		716	4.3	+1.8
Turnout		16,462	71.7	+5.0
Party total votes
Labor		8,383	53.2	+2.9
Liberal		7,134	45.3	−4.4
Independent	Richard Russell	229	1.5	+1.5

=== Darwin ===
1916 Tasmanian state election: Darwin
Party	Candidate	Votes	%	±%
Quota		1,928		
Labor	James Belton (elected 1)	2,601	19.3	+5.5
Labor	James Ogden (elected 2)	2,216	16.4	+2.5
Labor	Benjamin Watkins (elected 3)	1,047	7.8	−3.5
Labor	Leonard Bennett	978	7.2	+7.2
Liberal	Herbert Payne (elected 4)	1,569	11.6	−0.2
Liberal	Edward Hobbs (elected 6)	1,557	11.5	+11.5
Liberal	Stephen Margetts	1,057	7.8	+7.8
Liberal	George Pullen	1,039	7.7	−2.9
Independent	Joshua Whitsitt (elected 5)	1,428	10.6	+10.6
Total formal votes		13,492	94.1	−2.8
Informal votes		851	5.9	+2.8
Turnout		14,343	73.9	+11.9
Party total votes
Labor		6,842	50.7	−0.4
Liberal		5,222	38.7	−10.2
Independent	Joshua Whitsitt	1,428	10.6	+10.6

=== Denison ===
1916 Tasmanian state election: Denison
Party	Candidate	Votes	%	±%
Quota		2,428		
Liberal	Elliott Lewis (elected 2)	2,709	15.9	+0.5
Liberal	William Burgess (elected 4)	2,258	13.3	+13.3
Liberal	William Fullerton (elected 6)	1,805	10.6	+1.7
Liberal	John McPhee	1,793	10.6	+10.6
Labor	William Sheridan (elected 1)	3,327	19.6	+12.7
Labor	Walter Woods (elected 3)	2,190	12.9	+3.5
Labor	John Cleary (elected 5)	1,194	7.0	+7.0
Labor	John Lewis	935	5.5	+5.5
Labor	Robert Cosgrove	784	4.6	+4.6
Total formal votes		16,995	94.4	−2.4
Informal votes		1,014	5.6	+2.4
Turnout		18,009	74.9	+6.1
Party total votes
Liberal		8,565	50.4	−1.6
Labor		8,430	49.6	+1.6

=== Franklin ===
1916 Tasmanian state election: Franklin
Party	Candidate	Votes	%	±%
Quota		2,191		
Liberal	Frederick Burbury (elected 2)	2,819	18.4	+18.4
Liberal	John Evans (elected 3)	2,277	14.8	+1.6
Liberal	Alexander Hean (elected 6)	1,572	9.3	0.0
Liberal	Arthur Cotton	1,270	8.3	−10.7
Labor	John Earle (elected 1)	3,943	25.7	+4.5
Labor	William Shoobridge (elected 4)	1,350	8.8	+8.8
Labor	David Dicker (elected 5)	1,335	8.7	+2.7
Labor	George Martin	769	5.0	−5.4
Total formal votes		15,335	93.4	−3.4
Informal votes		1,086	6.6	+3.4
Turnout		16,421	74.2	+3.0
Party total votes
Liberal		7,938	51.8	−4.4
Labor		7,397	48.2	+4.4

=== Wilmot ===
1916 Tasmanian state election: Wilmot
Party	Candidate	Votes	%	±%
Quota		1,850		
Liberal	Walter Lee (elected 2)	2,631	20.3	+8.5
Liberal	Ernest Blyth (elected 5)	1,477	11.4	+11.4
Liberal	Herbert Hays (elected 4)	956	7.4	−4.8
Liberal	Edward Mulcahy (elected 6)	926	7.1	−8.8
Liberal	Edmund Hingston	522	4.0	+4.0
Liberal	William Connell	292	2.2	+2.2
Liberal	Alfred Stokes	276	2.1	+2.1
Labor	Joseph Lyons (elected 1)	2,812	21.7	+3.8
Labor	Michael O'Keefe (elected 3)	1,245	9.6	+1.8
Labor	Henry McFie	516	4.0	+4.0
Labor	John Heffernan	493	3.8	+3.8
Independent	Norman Cameron	800	6.2	−1.8
Total formal votes		12,946	94.2	−3.4
Informal votes		803	5.8	+3.4
Turnout		13,749	73.1	+6.7
Party total votes
Liberal		7,080	54.7	−1.1
Labor		5,066	39.1	+2.9
Independent	Norman Cameron	800	6.2	−1.8

== See also ==
- 1916 Tasmanian state election
- Members of the Tasmanian House of Assembly, 1916–1919
- Candidates of the 1916 Tasmanian state election
