= Candidates of the 1912 Tasmanian state election =

The 1912 Tasmanian state election was held on 30 April 1912

== Retiring Members ==
=== Liberal ===
- Edward Crowther MHA (Denison)
- Thomas Hodgman MHA (Franklin)

== House of Assembly ==
Sitting members are shown in bold text. Tickets that elected at least one MHA are highlighted in the relevant colour. Successful candidates are indicated by an asterisk (*).

=== Bass ===
Six seats were up for election. The Labor Party was defending two seats. The Liberal Party was defending four seats.

Labor candidates	Liberal candidates
Arthur Anderson; George Becker*; Richard Camm; **James Guy***; **Charles Howroyd***; Frederick Moore	**Thomas Bakhap***; Stephen Margetts; **Richard McKenzie***; William Oldham; **Robert Sadler**; **Albert Solomon***; David Storrer

=== Darwin ===
Six seats were up for election. The Labor Party was defending four seats. The Liberal Party was defending two seats.

Labor candidates	Liberal candidates
**James Belton***; **James Hurst**; Martin Kean; **James Ogden***; **Benjamin Watkins***	William Lamerton; **Herbert Payne***; George Pullen*; **Joshua Whitsitt***

=== Denison ===
Six seats were up for election. The Labor Party was defending two seats. The Liberal Party was defending four seats.

Labor candidates	Liberal candidates
Vincent Barker*; Henry Edmonds; Abraham Needham; **William Sheridan***; Newham Waterworth; **Walter Woods***	Thomas Amott; William Clifford; **Sir John Davies***; Arthur Davis; **Sir Elliott Lewis***; Loudim Macleod; Charles Metz; **Frederick Rattle**; Francis Valentine*; William Williams

=== Franklin ===
Six seats were up for election. The Labor Party was defending two seats. The Liberal Party was defending four seats.

Labor candidates	Liberal candidates
**David Dicker***; **John Earle***; George Martin*; William Shoobridge	William Bottrill; Arthur Cotton; **John Evans***; **Norman Ewing***; William Fullerton; **Alexander Hean***; George Leatham

=== Wilmot ===
Six seats were up for election. The Labor Party was defending one seat. The Liberal Party was defending five seats.

Labor candidates	Liberal candidates
William Curwen; **Joseph Lyons***; Michael O'Keefe*; Henry Shackcloth	**Jonathan Best**; Norman Cameron*; **Richard Field**; **Herbert Hays***; **Walter Lee***; **Edward Mulcahy***

== See also ==
- Members of the Tasmanian House of Assembly, 1909–1912
- Members of the Tasmanian House of Assembly, 1912–1913
