= Electoral results for the Division of Wilmot =

Australian division election results

This is a list of electoral results for the Division of Wilmot in Australian federal elections from the division's creation in 1903 until its abolition in 1984.

== Members ==
Member	Party	Term
Sir Edward Braddon	Free Trade	1903–1904
Norman Cameron	Free Trade	1904 by–1906
Norman Cameron	Independent Anti-Socialist	1906–1906
Llewellyn Atkinson	Anti-Socialist	1906–1909
Llewellyn Atkinson	Liberal	1909–1917
Llewellyn Atkinson	Nationalist	1917–1921
Llewellyn Atkinson	Country	1921–1928
Llewellyn Atkinson	Nationalist	1928–1929
Joseph Lyons	Labor	1929–1931
Joseph Lyons	Independent	1931–1931
Joseph Lyons	United Australia	1931–1939
Lancelot Spurr	Labor	1939 by–1940
Allan Guy	United Australia	1940–1945
Allan Guy	Liberal	1945–1946
Gil Duthie	Labor	1946–1975
Max Burr	Liberal	1975–1984

== Election results ==
=== Elections in the 1980s ===
==== 1983 ====
1983 Australian federal election: Wilmot
Party	Candidate	Votes	%	±%
Liberal	Max Burr	28,520	53.5	+3.4
Labor	David Llewellyn	22,783	42.7	−7.2
Democrats	Liz Holloway	1,336	2.5	+2.5
Independent	Bill Chugg	702	1.3	+1.3
Total formal votes		53,341	97.3	
Informal votes		1,467	2.7	
Turnout		54,808	96.2	
Two-party-preferred result
Liberal	Max Burr		55.1	+5.0
Labor	David Llewellyn		44.9	−5.0
Liberal hold		Swing	+5.0	

==== 1980 ====
1980 Australian federal election: Wilmot
Party	Candidate	Votes	%	±%
Liberal	Max Burr	25,607	50.1	−3.5
Labor	David Llewellyn	25,515	49.9	+3.5
Total formal votes		51,122	97.1	
Informal votes		1,547	2.9	
Turnout		52,699	96.7	
Liberal hold		Swing	−5.7	

=== Elections in the 1970s ===
==== 1977 ====
1977 Australian federal election: Wilmot
Party	Candidate	Votes	%	±%
Liberal	Max Burr	26,066	53.6	+1.0
Labor	David Llewellyn	20,415	42.0	−2.2
Democrats	Leon Gourlay	2,157	4.4	+4.4
Total formal votes		48,638	97.3	
Informal votes		1,363	2.7	
Turnout		50,001	97.1	
Two-party-preferred result
Liberal	Max Burr		55.8	+0.5
Labor	David Llewellyn		44.2	−0.5
Liberal hold		Swing	+0.5	

==== 1975 ====
1975 Australian federal election: Wilmot
Party	Candidate	Votes	%	±%
Liberal	Max Burr	25,407	52.6	+5.3
Labor	Gil Duthie	21,365	44.2	−8.5
National Country	Robert Griffin	1,165	2.4	+2.4
Workers	William Woods	353	0.7	+0.7
Total formal votes		48,290	98.0	
Informal votes		1,005	2.0	
Turnout		49,295	97.2	
Two-party-preferred result
Liberal	Max Burr		55.3	+8.0
Labor	Gil Duthie		44.7	−8.0
Liberal gain from Labor		Swing	+8.0	

==== 1974 ====
1974 Australian federal election: Wilmot
Party	Candidate	Votes	%	±%
Labor	Gil Duthie	24,248	52.7	−7.4
Liberal	Max Burr	21,764	47.3	+16.0
Total formal votes		46,012	98.0	
Informal votes		917	2.0	
Turnout		46,929	97.1	
Labor hold		Swing	−9.2	

==== 1972 ====
1972 Australian federal election: Wilmot
Party	Candidate	Votes	%	±%
Labor	Gil Duthie	25,075	60.1	+3.8
Liberal	Ian Hardy	13,071	31.3	−8.2
Democratic Labor	Ronald Butterworth	3,557	8.5	+4.3
Total formal votes		41,703	98.4	
Informal votes		666	1.6	
Turnout		42,369	97.5	
Two-party-preferred result
Labor	Gil Duthie		62.6	+5.5
Liberal	Ian Hardy		37.4	−5.5
Labor hold		Swing	+5.5	

=== Elections in the 1960s ===
==== 1969 ====
1969 Australian federal election: Wilmot
Party	Candidate	Votes	%	±%
Labor	Gil Duthie	22,866	56.3	+2.1
Liberal	Donald Paterson	16,027	39.5	−1.0
Democratic Labor	Darryl Sulzberger	1,720	4.2	−1.5
Total formal votes		40,613	98.7	
Informal votes		550	1.3	
Turnout		41,163	97.0	
Two-party-preferred result
Labor	Gil Duthie		57.1	+1.8
Liberal	Donald Paterson		42.9	−1.8
Labor hold		Swing	+1.8	

==== 1966 ====
1966 Australian federal election: Wilmot
Party	Candidate	Votes	%	±%
Labor	Gil Duthie	19,215	55.9	−2.8
Liberal	Donald Paterson	13,350	38.8	+5.7
Democratic Labor	Robert Wright	1,824	5.3	−2.9
Total formal votes		34,389	98.7	
Informal votes		446	1.3	
Turnout		34,835	96.2	
Two-party-preferred result
Labor	Gil Duthie		57.0	−4.1
Liberal	Donald Paterson		43.0	+4.1
Labor hold		Swing	−4.1	

==== 1963 ====
1963 Australian federal election: Wilmot
Party	Candidate	Votes	%	±%
Labor	Gil Duthie	19,908	58.7	−3.9
Liberal	Donald Paterson	11,231	33.1	+4.0
Democratic Labor	Alastair Davidson	2,792	8.2	−0.1
Total formal votes		33,931	99.1	
Informal votes		319	0.9	
Turnout		34,250	96.1	
Two-party-preferred result
Labor	Gil Duthie		61.1	−5.0
Liberal	Donald Paterson		38.9	+5.0
Labor hold		Swing	−5.0	

==== 1961 ====
1961 Australian federal election: Wilmot
Party	Candidate	Votes	%	±%
Labor	Gil Duthie	20,503	62.6	+3.0
Liberal	Richard Thomas	6,271	19.1	−5.7
Liberal	Royston Ringrose	3,280	10.0	+10.0
Democratic Labor	Alastair Davidson	2,718	8.3	+2.6
Total formal votes		32,772	97.0	
Informal votes		1,028	3.0	
Turnout		33,800	95.5	
Two-party-preferred result
Labor	Gil Duthie		66.1	+5.4
Liberal	Richard Thomas		33.9	−5.4
Labor hold		Swing	+5.4	

=== Elections in the 1950s ===
==== 1958 ====
1958 Australian federal election: Wilmot
Party	Candidate	Votes	%	±%
Labor	Gil Duthie	19,417	59.6	+4.6
Liberal	Ralph Cameron	11,328	34.8	−4.4
Democratic Labor	Francis Lillis	1,845	5.7	+0.0
Total formal votes		32,590	96.6	
Informal votes		1,147	3.4	
Turnout		33,737	96.4	
Two-party-preferred result
Labor	Gil Duthie		60.7	+4.6
Liberal	Ralph Cameron		39.3	−4.6
Labor hold		Swing	+4.6	

==== 1955 ====
1955 Australian federal election: Wilmot
Party	Candidate	Votes	%	±%
Labor	Gil Duthie	17,606	55.0	−1.4
Liberal	Robert Bethell	12,546	39.2	−4.4
Labor (A-C)	Owen Doherty	1,834	5.7	+5.7
Total formal votes		31,986	96.3	
Informal votes		1,238	3.7	
Turnout		33,224	96.5	
Two-party-preferred result
Labor	Gil Duthie		56.1	−0.3
Liberal	Robert Bethell		43.9	+0.3
Labor hold		Swing	−0.3	

==== 1954 ====
1954 Australian federal election: Wilmot
Party	Candidate	Votes	%	±%
Labor	Gil Duthie	19,193	56.2	+3.1
Liberal	Lionel Browning	14,959	43.8	−3.1
Total formal votes		34,152	99.2	
Informal votes		289	0.8	
Turnout		34,441	97.0	
Labor hold		Swing	+3.1	

==== 1951 ====
1951 Australian federal election: Wilmot
Party	Candidate	Votes	%	±%
Labor	Gil Duthie	16,746	53.1	+0.5
Liberal	Lionel Browning	14,794	46.9	−0.5
Total formal votes		31,540	96.7	
Informal votes		1,072	3.3	
Turnout		32,612	96.1	
Labor hold		Swing	+0.5	

=== Elections in the 1940s ===
==== 1949 ====
1949 Australian federal election: Wilmot
Party	Candidate	Votes	%	±%
Labor	Gil Duthie	16,150	52.6	+0.9
Liberal	Rickman Furmage	14,532	47.4	−0.9
Total formal votes		30,682	96.7	
Informal votes		1,036	3.3	
Turnout		31,718	95.3	
Labor hold		Swing	+0.9	

==== 1946 ====
1946 Australian federal election: Wilmot
Party	Candidate	Votes	%	±%
Labor	Gil Duthie	13,032	51.7	+6.1
Liberal	Allan Guy	12,177	48.3	−0.9
Total formal votes		25,209	97.4	
Informal votes		671	2.6	
Turnout		25,880	94.6	
Labor gain from Liberal		Swing	+3.4	

==== 1943 ====
1943 Australian federal election: Wilmot
Party	Candidate	Votes	%	±%
United Australia	Allan Guy	19,417	49.6	−7.5
Labor	Ern Pinkard	10,994	45.6	+2.2
Independent	John McGeary	1,259	5.2	+5.2
Total formal votes		24,105	97.4	
Informal votes		656	2.6	
Turnout		24,761	96.0	
Two-party-preferred result
United Australia	Allan Guy	12,463	51.7	−3.3
Labor	Ernest Pinkard	11,642	48.3	+3.3
United Australia hold		Swing	−3.3	

==== 1940 ====
1940 Australian federal election: Wilmot
Party	Candidate	Votes	%	±%
Labor	Lancelot Spurr	10,113	43.4	−3.4
United Australia	Allan Guy	8,301	35.6	+3.5
United Australia	Frank Edwards	4,913	21.1	+21.1
Total formal votes		23,327	96.7	
Informal votes		789	3.3	
Turnout		24,116	95.6	
Two-party-preferred result
United Australia	Allan Guy	12,841	55.0	−0.1
Labor	Lancelot Spurr	10,486	45.0	+0.1
United Australia gain from Labor		Swing	−0.1	

=== Elections in the 1930s ===
==== 1939 by-election ====
1939 Wilmot by-election
Party	Candidate	Votes	%	±%
United Australia	Allan Guy	6,673	29.7	−3.6
Labor	Lancelot Spurr	6,568	29.3	+0.0
Labor	Maurice Weston	3,925	17.5	+17.5
United Australia	Donald Cameron	2,657	11.8	+11.8
United Australia	Cecil Parsons	1,823	8.1	+8.1
Independent	John Watson	799	3.6	+3.6
Total formal votes		22,445	96.1	
Informal votes		915	3.9	
Turnout		23,360	92.4	
Two-party-preferred result
Labor	Lancelot Spurr	11,257	50.2	+5.3
United Australia	Allan Guy	11,188	49.8	−5.3
Labor gain from United Australia		Swing	+5.3	

Prime Minister Joseph Lyons (United Australia) died.

==== 1937 ====
1937 Australian federal election: Wilmot
Party	Candidate	Votes	%	±%
United Australia	Joseph Lyons	12,365	53.2	−4.3
Labor	Lancelot Spurr	6,384	27.4	+27.4
Labor	Maurice Weston	4,511	19.4	+19.4
Total formal votes		23,260	96.8	
Informal votes		776	3.2	
Turnout		24,036	94.3	
Two-party-preferred result
United Australia	Joseph Lyons		55.1	−4.3
Labor	Lancelot Spurr		44.9	+4.3
United Australia hold		Swing	−4.3	

==== 1934 ====
1934 Australian federal election: Wilmot
Party	Candidate	Votes	%	±%
United Australia	Joseph Lyons	12,924	57.5	−2.7
Social Credit	Henry Bye	5,182	23.1	+23.1
Social Credit	William Laird Smith	4,357	19.4	+19.4
Total formal votes		22,463	96.2	
Informal votes		885	3.8	
Turnout		23,348	94.5	
Two-party-preferred result
United Australia	Joseph Lyons		59.4	−12.7
Social Credit	Henry Bye		40.6	+40.6
United Australia hold		Swing	−12.7	

==== 1931 ====
1931 Australian federal election: Wilmot
Party	Candidate	Votes	%	±%
United Australia	Joseph Lyons	12,622	60.2	+13.1
Labor	George Becker	5,586	26.6	−26.3
Nationalist	George Pullen	2,776	13.2	+13.2
Total formal votes		20,984	95.3	
Informal votes		1,026	4.7	
Turnout		22,010	96.0	
Two-party-preferred result
United Australia	Joseph Lyons		72.1	+25.0
Labor	George Becker		27.9	−25.0
United Australia gain from Labor		Swing	+25.0	

=== Elections in the 1920s ===
==== 1929 ====
1929 Australian federal election: Wilmot
Party	Candidate	Votes	%	±%
Labor	Joseph Lyons	10,697	52.9	+52.9
Nationalist	Llewellyn Atkinson	9,538	47.1	−16.5
Total formal votes		20,235	97.1	
Informal votes		331	1.6	
Turnout		20,566	94.5	
Labor gain from Nationalist		Swing	+16.5	

==== 1928 ====
1928 Australian federal election: Wilmot
Party	Candidate	Votes	%	±%
Nationalist	Llewellyn Atkinson	7,791	43.3	−0.1
Independent	George Flowers	6,534	36.3	+36.3
Nationalist	Hector McFie	3,658	20.3	+20.3
Total formal votes		17,983	90.7	
Informal votes		1,839	9.3	
Turnout		19,822	92.8	
Two-party-preferred result
Nationalist	Llewellyn Atkinson	9,814	54.6	−2.4
Independent	George Flowers	8,169	45.4	+2.4
Nationalist gain from Country		Swing	−2.4	

==== 1925 ====
1925 Australian federal election: Wilmot
Party	Candidate	Votes	%	±%
Labor	Jens Jensen	7,118	38.7	+6.5
Country	Llewellyn Atkinson	5,448	29.6	−14.3
Nationalist	Percy Best	3,134	17.1	+7.8
Nationalist	Atherfield Newman	2,681	14.6	+14.6
Total formal votes		18,381	94.3	
Informal votes		1,121	5.7	
Turnout		19,502	89.7	
Two-party-preferred result
Country	Llewellyn Atkinson	10,746	57.0	−4.2
Labor	Jens Jensen	7,905	43.0	+4.2
Country hold		Swing	−4.2	

==== 1922 ====
1922 Australian federal election: Wilmot
Party	Candidate	Votes	%	±%
Labor	John Palamountain	2,596	32.2	+32.2
Nationalist	George Pullen	1,926	23.9	+29.4
Country	Llewellyn Atkinson	1,826	22.7	+18.2
Country	Norman Cameron	1,407	17.5	+17.5
Country	John Campbell	302	3.7	+3.7
Total formal votes		8,057	90.5	
Informal votes		850	9.5	
Turnout		8,907	40.8	
Two-party-preferred result
Country	Llewellyn Atkinson	4,930	61.2	+61.2
Labor	John Palamountain	3,127	38.8	+38.8
Country gain from Nationalist		Swing	+61.2	

=== Elections in the 1910s ===
==== 1919 ====
1919 Australian federal election: Wilmot
Party	Candidate	Votes	%	±%
Nationalist	Llewellyn Atkinson	4,015	46.7	+12.8
Nationalist	Henry McFie	2,368	27.6	+27.6
Country	Norman Cameron	2,210	25.7	+25.7
Total formal votes		8,593	93.4	
Informal votes		711	7.6	
Turnout		9,304	52.0	
Two-party-preferred result
Nationalist	Llewellyn Atkinson	5,169	60.2	+4.0
Nationalist	Henry McFie	3,424	39.8	+39.8
Nationalist hold		Swing	+4.0	

==== 1917 ====
1917 Australian federal election: Wilmot
Party	Candidate	Votes	%	±%
Nationalist	Llewellyn Atkinson	7,874	61.5	+0.6
Labor	Christopher Sheedy	4,240	33.1	−6.0
Independent	Norman Cameron	590	4.6	+4.6
Independent	Louis Page	108	0.8	+0.8
Total formal votes		12,812	95.8	
Informal votes		566	4.2	
Turnout		13,378	71.5	
Nationalist hold		Swing	+3.3	

==== 1914 ====
1914 Australian federal election: Wilmot
Party	Candidate	Votes	%	±%
Liberal	Llewellyn Atkinson	8,169	60.9	−1.7
Labor	Henry McFie	5,255	39.1	+1.7
Total formal votes		13,424	97.1	
Informal votes		404	2.9	
Turnout		13,828	74.0	
Liberal hold		Swing	−1.7	

==== 1913 ====
1913 Australian federal election: Wilmot
Party	Candidate	Votes	%	±%
Liberal	Llewellyn Atkinson	8,251	62.6	+6.0
Labor	Henry McFie	4,922	37.4	−6.0
Total formal votes		13,173	96.4	
Informal votes		494	3.6	
Turnout		13,667	73.0	
Liberal hold		Swing	+6.0	

==== 1910 ====
1910 Australian federal election: Wilmot
Party	Candidate	Votes	%	±%
Liberal	Llewellyn Atkinson	5,498	56.6	−6.6
Labour	Thomas Wilson	4,216	43.4	+6.6
Total formal votes		9,714	97.5	
Informal votes		252	2.5	
Turnout		9,966	55.9	
Liberal hold		Swing	−6.6	

=== Elections in the 1900s ===
==== 1906 ====
1906 Australian federal election: Wilmot
Party	Candidate	Votes	%	±%
Anti-Socialist	Llewellyn Atkinson	3,935	45.2	−9.7
Labour	Thomas Wilson	3,205	36.8	+36.8
Ind. Anti-Socialist	Norman Cameron	1,058	12.1	+12.1
Protectionist	Charles Fenton	510	5.9	−39.2
Total formal votes		8,708	95.7	
Informal votes		392	4.3	
Turnout		9,100	53.7	
Anti-Socialist hold		Swing	−0.7	

==== 1904 by-election ====
1904 Wilmot by-election
Party	Candidate	Votes	%	±%
Free Trade	Norman Cameron	2,368	52.03	−2.85
Protectionist	John Cheek	2,183	47.97	+2.85
Total formal votes		4,551	96.75	−1.49
Informal votes		153	3.25	+1.49
Registered electors		15,718		
Turnout		4,704	29.93	−9.16
Free Trade hold		Swing	−2.85	

Sir Edward Braddon (Free Trade) died.

==== 1903 ====
1903 Australian federal election: Wilmot
Party	Candidate	Votes	%	±%
Free Trade	Sir Edward Braddon	3,313	54.9	+54.9
Protectionist	John Cheek	2,723	45.1	+45.1
Total formal votes		6,036	98.9	
Informal votes		108	1.8	
Turnout		6,144	39.1	
Free Trade win		(new seat)		
