= Candidates of the 1916 Tasmanian state election =

The 1916 Tasmanian state election was held on 23 March 1916.

== Retiring Members ==
=== Labor ===
- Vincent Barker MHA (Denison)
- Lyndhurst Giblin MHA (Denison)

=== Liberal ===
- Daniel Ryan MHA (Franklin)

== House of Assembly ==
Sitting members are shown in bold text. Tickets that elected at least one MHA are highlighted in the relevant colour. Successful candidates are indicated by an asterisk (*).

=== Bass ===
Six seats were up for election. The Labor Party was defending three seats. The Liberal Party was defending three seats.

Labor candidates	Liberal candidates	Independent candidates
**George Becker***; Allan Guy*; **Charles Howroyd***; **James McDonald**; William Sheehan	**John Hayes***; **Alexander Marshall***; James Newton; **Robert Sadler***	Richard Russell

=== Darwin ===
Six seats were up for election. The Labor Party was defending three seats. The Liberal Party was defending three seats, although Joshua Whitsitt was running as an independent.

Labor candidates	Liberal candidates	Independent candidates
**James Belton***; Leonard Bennett; **James Ogden***; **Benjamin Watkins***	Edward Hobbs*; Stephen Margetts; **Herbert Payne***; **George Pullen**	**Joshua Whitsitt***

=== Denison ===
Six seats were up for election. The Labor Party was defending four seats. The Liberal Party was defending two seats.

Labor candidates	Liberal candidates
John Cleary*; Robert Cosgrove; John Lewis; **William Sheridan***; **Walter Woods***	William Burgess*; **William Fullerton***; **Sir Elliott Lewis***; John McPhee

=== Franklin ===
Six seats were up for election. The Labor Party was defending three seats. The Liberal Party was defending three seats.

Labor candidates	Liberal candidates
**David Dicker***; **John Earle***; **George Martin**; William Shoobridge*	Frederick Burbury*; **Arthur Cotton**; **John Evans***; Alexander Hean*

=== Wilmot ===
Six seats were up for election. The Labor Party was defending two seats. The Liberal Party was defending four seats.

Labor candidates	Liberal candidates	Independent candidates
John Heffernan; **Joseph Lyons***; Henry McFie; **Michael O'Keefe***	**Ernest Blyth***; William Connell; **Herbert Hays***; Edmund Hingston; **Walter Lee***; **Edward Mulcahy***; Alfred Stokes	Norman Cameron

== See also ==
- Members of the Tasmanian House of Assembly, 1913–1916
- Members of the Tasmanian House of Assembly, 1916–1919
