= Members of the Tasmanian House of Assembly, 1919–1922 =

This is a list of members of the Tasmanian House of Assembly between the 31 May 1919 election and the 10 June 1922 election. Nationalist MHA Walter Lee was the Premier of Tasmania throughout the term. In 1922, shortly before the election, a new Country Party emerged with several sitting Nationalist MPs joining it.

Name	Party	Division	Years in office
George Becker	Labor	Bass	1912–1931; 1934–1941
James Belton	Labor	Darwin	1909–1931
Ernest Blyth	Nationalist/Country	Wilmot	1913–1925
John Cleary	Labor	Denison	1916–1928
Robert Cosgrove	Labor	Denison	1919–1922; 1925–1931; 1934–1958
David Dicker	Labor/Independent	Franklin	1909–1922
William Dixon	Nationalist/Country	Franklin	1919–1922
John Evans	Nationalist	Franklin	1897–1937
Allan Guy	Labor	Bass	1916–1929
John Hayes	Nationalist	Bass	1913–1923
Herbert Hays	Nationalist	Wilmot	1911–1922
Alexander Hean	Nationalist	Franklin	1903–1913; 1916–1925
Edward Hobbs	Nationalist/Country	Darwin	1916–1934
James Hurst	Labor	Darwin	1910–1912; 1919–1926
Walter Lee	Nationalist	Wilmot	1909–1946
Elliott Lewis	Nationalist	Denison	1886–1903; 1909–1922
Joseph Lyons^{[1]}	Labor	Wilmot	1909–1929
John McPhee	Nationalist	Denison	1919–1934; 1941–1946
Alexander Marshall	Nationalist	Bass	1914–1925
James Newton	Nationalist	Bass	1917–1928
James Ogden	Labor	Darwin	1906–1922
Albert Ogilvie	Labor	Franklin	1919–1939
Michael O'Keefe	Labor	Wilmot	1912–1926
Herbert Payne^{[2]}	Nationalist	Darwin	1903–1920
Percy Pollard^{[2]}	Nationalist	Darwin	1917–1919; 1920–1922
George Pullen	Nationalist	Wilmot	1912–1916; 1919–1922
Robert Sadler	Nationalist	Bass	1900–1912; 1913–1922
William Sheridan	Labor	Denison	1909–1913; 1914–1928
Robert Snowden	Nationalist	Denison	1919–1924
Benjamin Watkins	Labor	Franklin	1906–1917; 1919–1922; 1925–1934
Joshua Whitsitt	Independent/Country	Darwin	1909–1922

== Notes ==
^{1} Labor MHA for Wilmot, Joseph Lyons, resigned to contest the federal seat of Darwin at the 13 December 1919 election, and was unsuccessful. He was re-elected at the Wilmot by-election on 10 January 1920.
^{2} Nationalist MHA for Darwin, Herbert Payne, resigned in January 1920 to contest a vacancy on the Australian Senate. Nationalist candidate Percy Pollard was elected on 29 January 1920.

== Sources ==
- Hughes, Colin A.; Graham, B. D. (1976). Voting for the South Australian, Western Australian and Tasmanian Lower Houses, 1890-1964. Canberra: Australian National University. ISBN 0-7081-1334-6.
- Parliament of Tasmania (2006). The Parliament of Tasmania from 1856
