= Members of the Tasmanian House of Assembly, 1916–1919 =

This is a list of members of the Tasmanian House of Assembly between the 25 March 1916 election and the 31 May 1919 election. At the 1916 election, no party won a majority, and the Liberals' Walter Lee became Premier of Tasmania. During the term, the Liberal Party converted into the new Nationalist Party, and the Labor Party split over conscription. However, most of the Parliamentary Labor Party stayed with the executive, and the two MHAs who left the Party switched to federal politics. The state of flux, however, resulted in four seats switching from Labor to Nationalist at by-elections and recounts.

All members listed here as Nationalists who held office prior to 1917 were previously known as Liberals.

Name	Party	Division	Years in office
George Becker	Labor	Bass	1912–1931; 1934–1941
James Belton^{[3]}	Labor	Darwin	1909–1931
Ernest Blyth	Nationalist	Wilmot	1913–1925
Frederick Burbury	Nationalist	Franklin	1916–1919
William Burgess^{[2]}	Nationalist	Denison	1881–1891; 1916–1917
John Cleary	Labor	Denison	1916–1928
William Connell^{[4]}	Nationalist	Wilmot	1919
Arthur Cotton^{[1]}	Nationalist	Franklin	1913–1916; 1917–1919
David Dicker	Labor	Franklin	1909–1922
John Earle^{[1]}	Labor/Nationalist	Franklin	1906–1917
John Evans	Nationalist	Franklin	1897–1937
George Foster^{[2]}	Nationalist	Denison	1917–1919
William Fullerton	Nationalist	Denison	1913–1919
Allan Guy	Labor	Bass	1916–1929
John Hayes	Nationalist	Bass	1913–1923
Herbert Hays	Nationalist	Wilmot	1911–1922
Alexander Hean	Nationalist	Franklin	1903–1913; 1916–1925
Edward Hobbs	Nationalist	Darwin	1916–1934
Charles Hoggins^{[3]}	Nationalist	Denison	1898–1900; 1900–1903; 1917–1919
Charles Howroyd^{[3]}	Labor/Nationalist	Bass	1906–1917
Walter Lee	Nationalist	Wilmot	1909–1946
Elliott Lewis	Nationalist	Denison	1886–1903; 1909–1922
Joseph Lyons	Labor	Wilmot	1909–1929
Alexander Marshall	Nationalist	Bass	1914–1925
Edward Mulcahy^{[4]}	Nationalist	Wilmot	1891–1903; 1910–1919
James Newton	Nationalist	Bass	1917–1928
James Ogden	Labor	Darwin	1906–1922
Michael O'Keefe	Labor	Wilmot	1912–1926
Herbert Payne	Nationalist	Darwin	1903–1920
Percy Pollard^{[3]}	Nationalist	Darwin	1917–1919; 1920–1922
Robert Sadler	Nationalist	Bass	1900–1912; 1913–1922
William Sheridan	Labor	Denison	1909–1913; 1914–1928
William Shoobridge	Labor	Franklin	1916–1919; 1922–1928; 1929–1931
Benjamin Watkins^{[3]}	Labor	Darwin	1906–1917; 1919–1922; 1925–1934
Joshua Whitsitt	Independent	Darwin	1909–1922
Walter Woods^{[3]}	Labor	Denison	1906–1917; 1925–1931

== Notes ==
^{1} Nationalist (formerly Labor) MHA for Franklin, John Earle, resigned on 1 March 1917, and on the same day was appointed to a vacancy in the Australian Senate. Nationalist candidate and former MHA Arthur Cotton was elected on 14 April 1917.
^{2} Nationalist (formerly Liberal) MHA William Burgess died on 1 May 1917. Nationalist candidate George Foster was elected on 23 June 1917.
^{3} The 5 May 1917 federal election resulted in several MHAs resigning to contest seats. Labor MHAs Walter Woods and James Belton attempted to secure Australian Senate seats, whilst Labor MHA Benjamin Watkins attempted to win the Denison seat and Nationalist (formerly Labor) MHA Charles Howroyd won Darwin. On 7 July 1917, their seats went to by-election, with Belton returning, Watkins being replaced by Nationalist candidate Percy Pollard, Woods by Nationalist candidate Charles Hoggins, and Howroyd with Nationalist (formerly Labor) candidate James Newton.
^{4} Nationalist MHA for Wilmot, Edward Mulcahy, retired in January 1919. Nationalist candidate William Connell was elected on 16 January 1919.

== Sources ==
- Hughes, Colin A.; Graham, B. D. (1976). Voting for the South Australian, Western Australian and Tasmanian Lower Houses, 1890-1964. Canberra: Australian National University. ISBN 0-7081-1334-6.
- Parliament of Tasmania (2006). The Parliament of Tasmania from 1856
