= Members of the Tasmanian House of Assembly, 1909–1912 =

This is a list of members of the Tasmanian House of Assembly between the 30 April 1909 election and the 30 April 1912 election.

A redistribution in 1907 resulted in the abolition of all of the single-member seats and the adoption of multi-member districts based on the five federal electorates that had been created for Tasmania. The Hare-Clark proportional representation system was used to elect six members to each of the new districts. In addition, the Gregory fractional method was used to transfer surplus votes held by winners and the Droop quota was used (unlike the whole vote transfer method and Hare quota that were used in 1897 and 1900). These changes took effect with the 1909 election.

One major outcome was the formation of political parties. Prior to 1909, members other than those pledged to the Labor Party had adopted loose and flexible affiliations, generally being known as "Ministerialist", "Oppositionist/Liberal" or "Independent". A coalition of former Ministerialists, Independents and Liberals formed the Anti-Socialist Party, which became the Liberal Party of Tasmania in 1912. Meanwhile, another group of Oppositionists formed the Liberal Democrat Party.

The second major result was the product of the election itself—the near-complete destruction of the former Liberal grouping which had originally formed around Sir Edward Braddon and Andrew Inglis Clark, and the considerable rise in the fortunes of the Labor Party. They gained 12 seats in the new Assembly, and for the first time in Tasmania's history, held government for a week in October 1909 under Premier John Earle.

Name	Party	Division	Years in office
Thomas Bakhap	Anti-Socialist	Bass	1909–1913
James Belton	Labor	Darwin	1909–1931
Jonathan Best	Anti-Socialist	Wilmot	1894–1897; 1899–1912; 1913
Edward Crowther	Anti-Socialist	Denison	1878–1912
John Davies	Anti-Socialist	Denison	1884–1913
David Dicker	Labor	Franklin	1909–1922
John Earle	Labor	Franklin	1906–1917
John Evans	Anti-Socialist	Franklin	1897–1937
Norman Ewing	Anti-Socialist	Franklin	1909–1915
Richard Field	Anti-Socialist	Wilmot	1909–1912
James Guy	Labor	Bass	1909–1913
Herbert Hays^{[3]}	Anti-Socialist	Wilmot	1911–1922
Alexander Hean	Anti-Socialist	Franklin	1903–1913; 1916–1925
Thomas Hodgman	Anti-Socialist	Franklin	1900–1912
John Hope^{[3]}	Anti-Socialist	Wilmot	1900–1911
Charles Howroyd	Labor	Bass	1906–1917
James Hurst^{[1]}	Labor	Darwin	1910–1912; 1919–1926
Jens Jensen^{[2]}	Labor	Wilmot	1903–1910; 1922–1925; 1928–1934
Walter Lee	Anti-Socialist	Wilmot	1909–1946
Elliott Lewis	Anti-Socialist	Denison	1886–1903; 1909–1922
James Long^{[1]}	Labor	Darwin	1903–1910
Joseph Lyons	Labor	Wilmot	1909–1929
Richard McKenzie	Anti-Socialist	Bass	1906–1913
Edward Mulcahy^{[2]}	Anti-Socialist	Wilmot	1891–1903; 1910–1919
James Ogden	Labor	Darwin	1906–1922
Herbert Payne	Anti-Socialist	Darwin	1903–1920
Frederick Rattle	Anti-Socialist	Denison	1903–1912
Robert Sadler	Liberal Democrat	Bass	1900–1912; 1913–1922
William Sheridan	Labor	Denison	1909–1913; 1914–1928
Albert Solomon	Anti-Socialist	Bass	1909–1914
Benjamin Watkins	Labor	Darwin	1906–1917; 1919–1922; 1925–1934
Joshua Whitsitt	Anti-Socialist	Darwin	1909–1922
Walter Woods	Labor	Denison	1906–1917; 1925–1931

== Notes ==
^{1} On 28 February 1910, Darwin Labor MHA James Long resigned to contest a seat in the Australian Senate. Labor candidate James Hurst replaced him on 8 June 1910.
^{2} On 25 February 1910, Wilmot Labor MHA Jens Jensen resigned to contest the Bass seat in the federal House of Representatives. Anti-Socialist candidate Edward Mulcahy replaced him on 8 June 1910.
^{3} On 14 April 1911, Wilmot Anti-Socialist MHA John Hope resigned to contest the Legislative Council seat of Meander, which he won on 2 May 1911. Anti-Socialist candidate Herbert Hays replaced him on 8 June 1911.

== Sources ==
- Hughes, Colin A.; Graham, B. D. (1976). Voting for the South Australian, Western Australian and Tasmanian Lower Houses, 1890-1964. Canberra: Australian National University. ISBN 0-7081-1334-6.
- Parliament of Tasmania (2006). The Parliament of Tasmania from 1856
