= Members of the Tasmanian House of Assembly, 1912–1913 =

This is a list of members of the Tasmanian House of Assembly between the 30 April 1912 election and the 23 January 1913 election.

The term was shortened due to instability within the newly formed Liberal Party.

Name	Party	Division	Years in office
Thomas Bakhap	Liberal	Bass	1909–1913
Vincent Barker	Labor	Denison	1912–1916
George Becker	Labor	Bass	1912–1931; 1934–1941
James Belton	Labor	Darwin	1909–1931
Norman Cameron	Liberal	Wilmot	1893–1894; 1897–1899; 1912–1913; 1925–1928
John Davies	Liberal	Denison	1884–1913
David Dicker	Labor	Franklin	1909–1922
John Earle	Labor	Franklin	1906–1917
John Evans	Liberal	Franklin	1897–1937
Norman Ewing	Liberal	Franklin	1909–1915
James Guy	Labor	Bass	1909–1913
Herbert Hays	Liberal	Wilmot	1911–1922
Alexander Hean	Liberal	Franklin	1903–1913; 1916–1925
Charles Howroyd	Labor	Bass	1906–1917
Walter Lee	Liberal	Wilmot	1909–1946
Elliott Lewis	Liberal	Denison	1886–1903; 1909–1922
Joseph Lyons	Labor	Wilmot	1909–1929
Richard McKenzie	Liberal	Bass	1906–1913
George Martin	Labor	Franklin	1912–1916
Edward Mulcahy	Liberal	Wilmot	1891–1903; 1910–1919
James Ogden	Labor	Darwin	1906–1922
Michael O'Keefe	Labor	Wilmot	1912–1926
Herbert Payne	Liberal	Darwin	1903–1920
George Pullen	Liberal	Darwin	1912–1916; 1919–1922
William Sheridan	Labor	Denison	1909–1913; 1914–1928
Albert Solomon	Liberal	Bass	1909–1914
Francis Valentine	Liberal	Denison	1912–1913
Benjamin Watkins	Labor	Darwin	1906–1917; 1919–1922; 1925–1934
Joshua Whitsitt	Liberal	Darwin	1909–1922
Walter Woods	Labor	Denison	1906–1917; 1925–1931

== Sources ==
- Hughes, Colin A.; Graham, B. D. (1976). Voting for the South Australian, Western Australian and Tasmanian Lower Houses, 1890-1964. Canberra: Australian National University. ISBN 0-7081-1334-6.
- Parliament of Tasmania (2006). The Parliament of Tasmania from 1856
