= Llewellyn Atkinson =

Australian politician (1867–1945)

The Honourable Llewellyn Atkinson
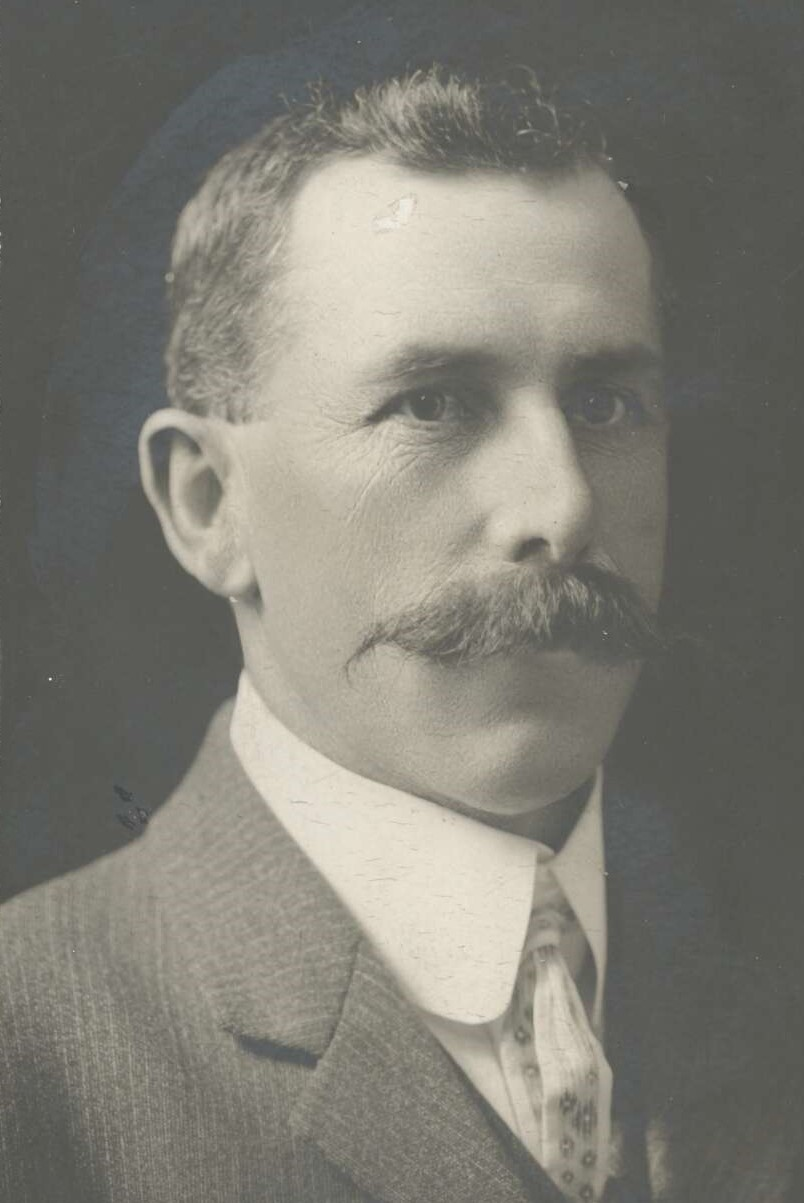

Member of the Australian Parliament for Wilmot
- In office 12 December 1906 – 12 October 1929
- Preceded by: Norman Cameron
- Succeeded by: Joseph Lyons

Personal details
- Born: 18 December 1867 Launceston, Tasmania, Australia
- Died: 1 November 1945 (aged 77) Latrobe, Tasmania, Australia
- Party: Anti-Socialist (1906–09); Liberal (1909–17); Nationalist (1917–22); Country (1922–26); Independent (1926–27); Nationalist (from 1927)
- Profession: Lawyer

Llewellyn Atkinson (18 December 1867 – 1 November 1945) was an Australian politician. He was a member of the Australian House of Representatives from 1906 to 1929 and a member of the Tasmanian House of Assembly from 1931 to 1934, representing successive conservative parties.

== Early life ==
Atkinson was born on 18 December 1867 in Launceston, Tasmania. He was educated at Launceston Church Grammar School. He enrolled at the University of Melbourne to study law in 1885, where he was resident at Trinity College. He was called to the bar in 1894 and became a solicitor, returning to Tasmania to practise at Latrobe and later forming a partnership with T. A. Scott. He was a member of the Latrobe Town Board and the board of management of the Devon Hospital and a prominent local Freemason, serving as master of the Concord Masonic Lodge and a longstanding member of the Latrobe Mistletoe Lodge. Atkinson was also a keen sportsman and a talented cricketer and footballer in his youth.

== Federal politics ==
Atkinson was elected to the House of Representatives at the 1906 federal election, standing as an Anti-Socialist candidate. He won the seat of Wilmot, defeating the incumbent member Norman Cameron. Both he and Cameron identified as Anti-Socialists, but the local organisation withdrew its endorsement from Cameron as it believed Atkinson was more popular in the electorate and did not wish to split the vote.

Atkinson joined the new Liberal Party in 1909, which merged into the new Nationalist Party in 1917. He served on the Joint Statutory Committee on Public Accounts from 1914 to 1919 and on the Joint Statutory Committee on Public Works from 1920 to 1921. On 24 October 1922, Atkinson announced that he would join the Country Party and seek the endorsement of the Primary Producers' Association and the Farmers and Stockowners Association. He was re-elected at the 1922 election.

On 9 February 1923, Atkinson was appointed to federal cabinet as Vice-President of the Executive Council in the newly formed Bruce–Page government. He continued in the position until a ministerial reshuffle on 18 June 1926. Atkinson subsequently announced on 25 June 1926 that he would cease attending meetings of the parliamentary Country Party and would sit as an independent supporter of the government. He re-joined the Nationalist Party on 17 March 1927. He was re-elected at the 1928 election but lost his seat to Australian Labor Party candidate Joseph Lyons at the early 1929 election.

== State politics and later life ==
In 1931, he was elected as a Nationalist to the Tasmanian House of Assembly seat of Wilmot, but was defeated for re-election in 1934. He died at Latrobe in 1945 and was buried at the Latrobe General Cemetery. He never married, and resided with his sister at their family country home, "Frogmore".

== Notes ==
Political offices
Preceded by John Earle	Vice-President of the Executive Council; 1923–1926	Succeeded by George Pearce
Parliament of Australia
Preceded by Norman Cameron	Member for Wilmot; 1906–1929	Succeeded by Joseph Lyons
