= 1939 Wilmot by-election =

27 May 1939
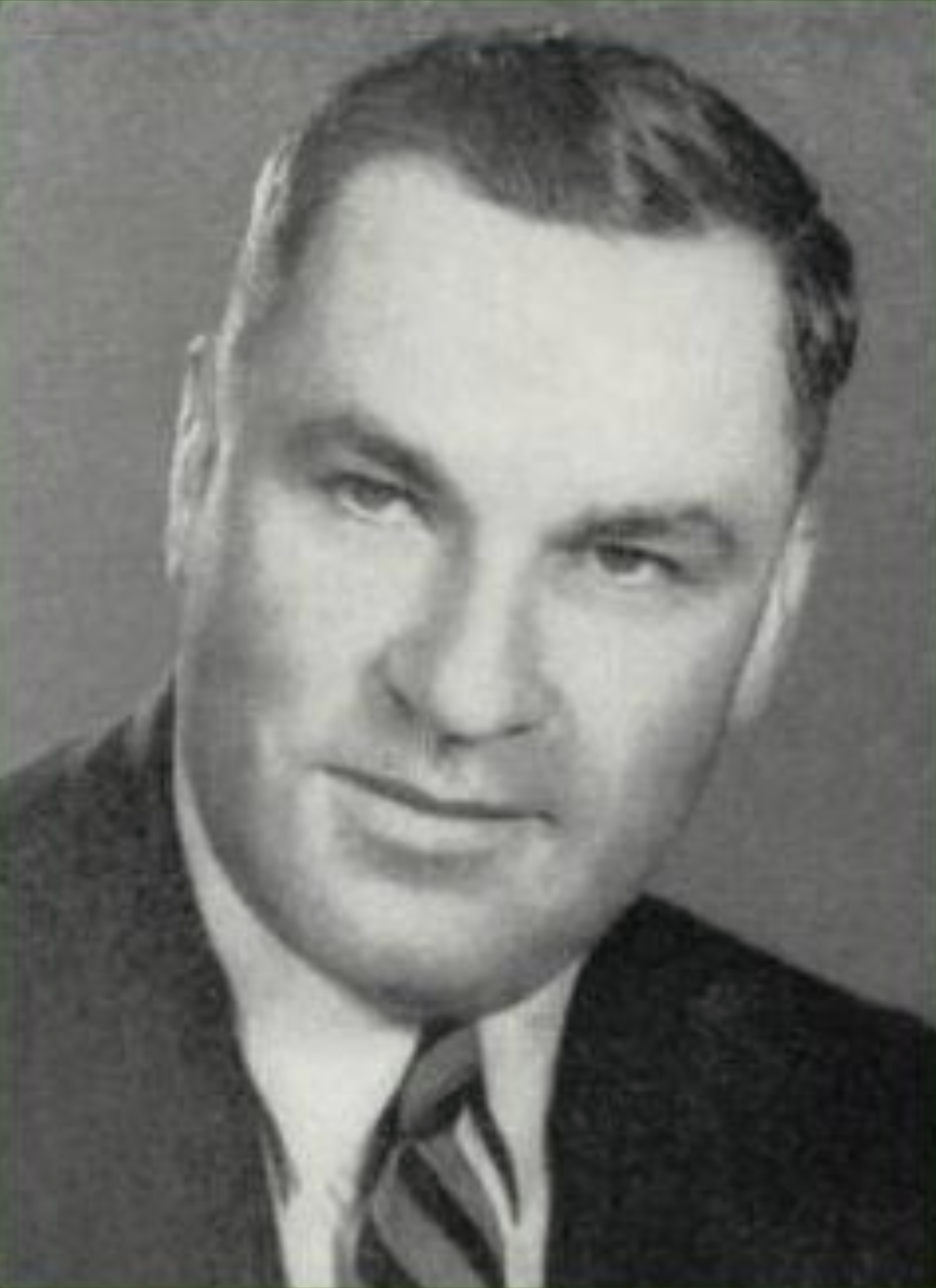

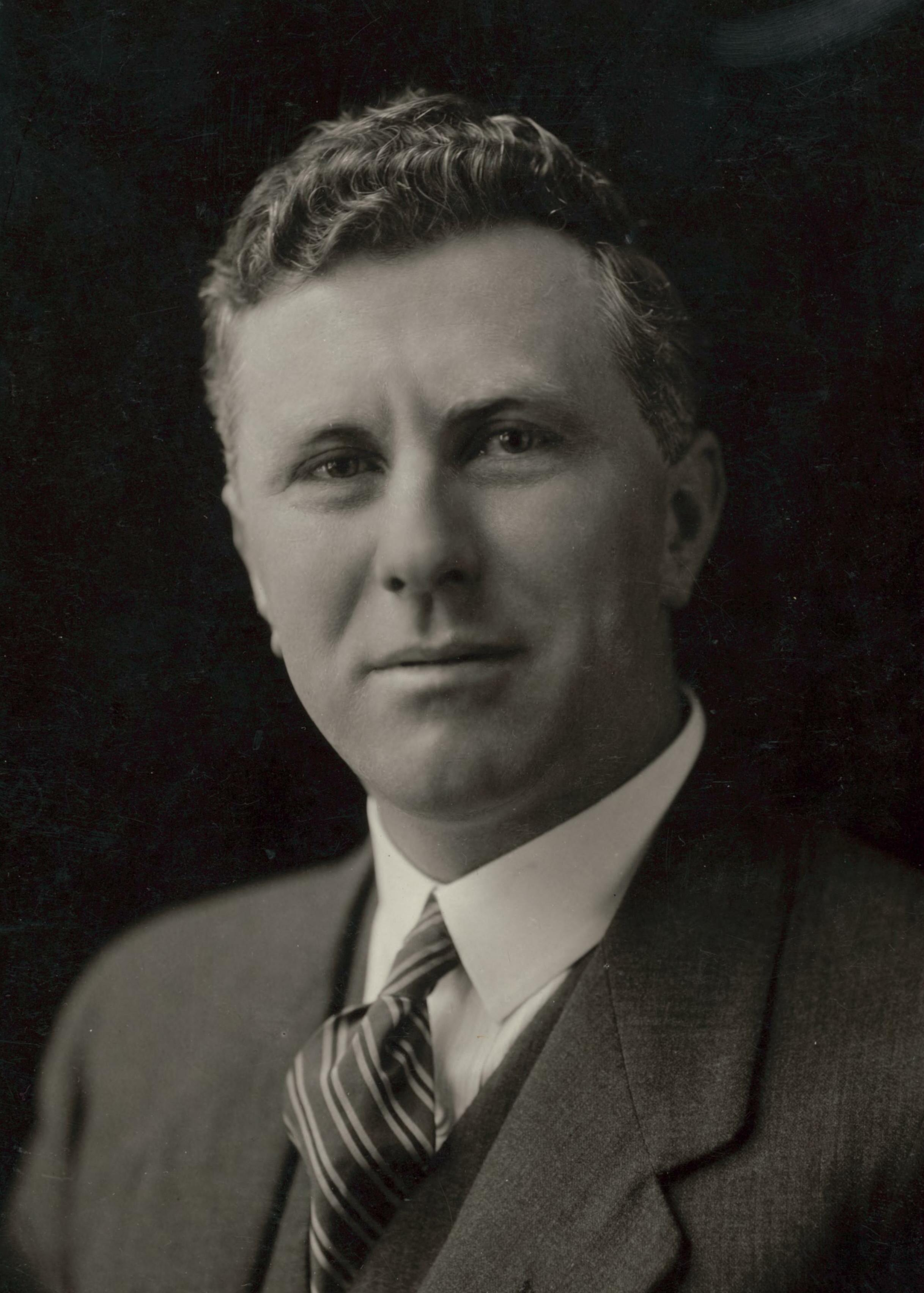
	First party	Second party
Candidate	Lancelot Spurr	Allan Guy
Party	Labor	United Australia
First preference vote	6,568	6,673
Percentage	29.3%	29.7%
Swing	▼3.6pp	Steady
TCP	50.1%	49.8%
TCP swing	▲5.3pp	▼5.3pp
	Third party	Fourth party
	ALP	UAP
Candidate	Maurice Weston	Donald Cameron
Party	Labor	United Australia
First preference vote	3,925	2,657
Percentage	17.5%	11.8%
Swing	▲17.5pp	▲11.8pp
MP before election
Joseph Lyons
United Australia
Elected MP
Kevin Newman
Labor

A by-election was held for the Australian House of Representatives seat of Wilmot on 27 May 1939. This was triggered by the death of Prime Minister Joseph Lyons, a member of the United Australia Party.

The by-election was won by Labor candidate Lancelot Spurr.

== Results ==
1939 Wilmot by-election
Party	Candidate	Votes	%	±%
United Australia	Allan Guy	6,673	29.7	−3.6
Labor	Lancelot Spurr	6,568	29.3	+0.0
Labor	Maurice Weston	3,925	17.5	+17.5
United Australia	Donald Cameron	2,657	11.8	+11.8
United Australia	Cecil Parsons	1,823	8.1	+8.1
Independent	John Watson	799	3.6	+3.6
Total formal votes		22,445	96.1	
Informal votes		915	3.9	
Turnout		23,360	92.4	
Two-party-preferred result
Labor	Lancelot Spurr	11,257	50.2	+5.3
United Australia	Allan Guy	11,188	49.8	−5.3
Labor gain from United Australia		Swing	+5.3	
