= Max Burr =

Australian politician (born 1939)

Max Burr OAM

Member of the Australian Parliament for Wilmot
- In office 13 December 1975 – 1 December 1984
- Preceded by: Gil Duthie
- Succeeded by: Division abolished

Member of the Australian Parliament for Lyons
- In office 1 December 1984 – 8 February 1993
- Preceded by: Division created
- Succeeded by: Dick Adams

Personal details
- Born: 9 January 1939 (age 87) Launceston, Tasmania
- Party: Liberal Party of Australia
- Occupation: Accountant

Maxwell Arthur Burr, OAM (born 9 January 1939) is an Australian retired politician. Born in Launceston, Tasmania, he was educated at Launceston Business College before becoming an accountant and Secretary of the Tasmanian Farmers' Federation. In 1975, he was elected to the Australian House of Representatives as the Liberal member for Wilmot, defeating long-serving Labor member Gil Duthie. When Wilmot was abolished in 1984, Burr successfully contested its successor, Lyons. He held the seat until his retirement in 1993.

After retirement, Burr was diagnosed with Parkinson's disease in 2012. In 2019, news coverage documented his use of experimental infrared light therapy as a treatment for his condition, which he believed had significantly alleviated a large number of his symptoms and which had encouraged a number of other people to do likewise. A clinical trial of the system was announced in early 2019.

Burr was awarded a Medal of the Order of Australia (OAM) in the 2021 Australia Day Honours for "service to the Parliament of Australia, and to the community of Tasmania."

Parliament of Australia
Preceded by Gil Duthie	Member for Wilmot; 1975–1984	Division abolished
Division created	Member for Lyons; 1984–1993	Succeeded by Dick Adams
