= 1922 Tasmanian state election =

State election in Australia

- 10 June 1922

All 30 seats to the House of Assembly
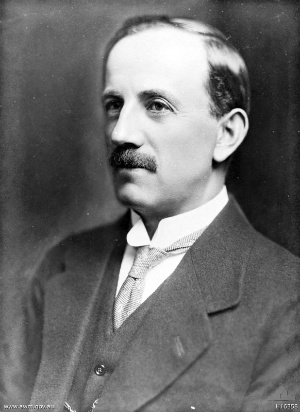

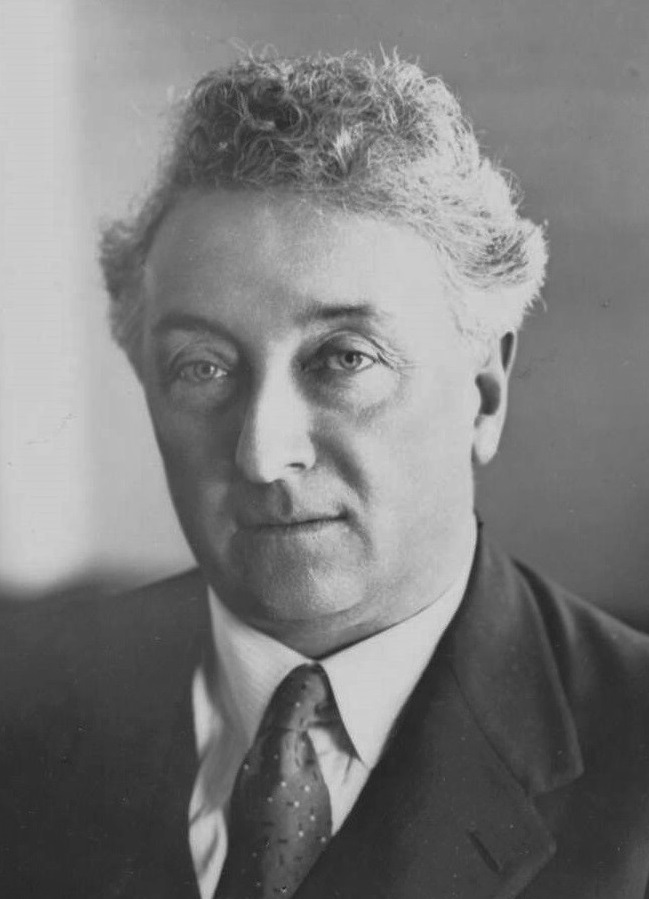

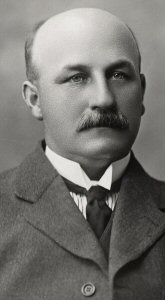
	First party	Second party	Third party
Leader	Walter Lee	Joseph Lyons	Ernest Blyth
Party	Nationalist	Labor	Country
Leader since	September 1915	November 1916	1922
Leader's seat	Wilmot	Wilmot	Wilmot
Last election	16 seats	13 seats	0 seats
Seats won	12	12	5
Seat change	▼4	▼1	▲5
Percentage	40.96%	36.74%	13.98%
Swing	▼14.25	▼4.70	▲13.98
- Results of the election
Premier before election
Walter Lee
Nationalist
Resulting Premier
Walter Lee
Nationalist

The 1922 Tasmanian state election was held on 10 June 1922 in the Australian state of Tasmania to elect 30 members of the Tasmanian House of Assembly. The election used the Hare-Clark proportional representation system — six members were elected from each of five electorates.

The incumbent Premier of Tasmania was Walter Lee of the Nationalist Party. The Labor Party was led by Joseph Lyons. Before the election, a new party had emerged, the Country Party, a conservative party aiming to represent farmers and rural interests. In Tasmania, the new party was led by Ernest Blyth.

At the election, the Nationalist Party lost four seats and Labor lost one seat. The Country Party won 5 seats and the balance of power. Despite surviving a no-confidence vote, Lee resigned and recommended that the Governor of Tasmania send for Blyth. Blyth organised a meeting between the Nationalist and Country parties, and they agreed to form Tasmania's first coalition government with John Hayes as Premier.

In this election, women were first eligible to stand for the House of Assembly. There were three women candidates standing, including Alicia O'Shea Petersen, all of whom stood as independents and all of whom were unsuccessful.

== Results ==
Party	Votes	%	+/–	Seats	+/–
Nationalist	27,816	40.96	-14.25	12	▼4
Labor	24,956	36.74	-4.70	12	▼1
Country	9,498	13.98	New	5	New
Independents	4,759	7.01	+3.65	1	Steady
Independent Labor	889	1.31	+1.31	0	Steady
Total	67,918	100.00	–	30	–
Valid votes	67,918	97.37			
Invalid/blank votes	1,834	2.63	-1.33		
Total votes	69,752	100.00	–		
Registered voters/turnout	110,549	63.10	-2.98		

Popular vote
Nationalist	40.96%
Labor	36.74%
Country	13.98%
Independents	8.32%

Seats
Nationalist	40.00%
Labor	40.00%
Country	16.67%
Independents	3.33%

== Distribution of votes ==
=== Primary vote by division ===
	Bass	Darwin	Denison	Franklin	Wilmot
Labor Party	39.5%	43.5%	39.7%	32.2%	27.4%
Nationalist	46.1%	17.9%	52.4%	38.1%	38.3%
Country	6.1%	28.6%	–	22.5%	22.4%
Other	8.3%	10.0%	7.9%	8.0%	11.9%

=== Distribution of seats ===
Electorate	Seats won
Bass	
Darwin	
Denison	
Franklin	
Wilmot	

Labor
Nationalist
Country
Independent

== See also ==
- Members of the Tasmanian House of Assembly, 1922–1925
- Candidates of the 1922 Tasmanian state election
