= Division of Wilmot =

Former Australian federal electoral division

Coordinates: 42.7667°S 147.0500°E

Wilmot Australian House of Representatives Division
- Created: 1903
- Abolished: 1984
- Namesake: Sir John Eardley-Wilmot

The Division of Wilmot was an Australian Electoral Division in the state of Tasmania. It was named after Sir John Eardley-Wilmot, the sixth Lieutenant-Governor of Tasmania.

Prior to 1903, the entire state of Tasmania was covered by a single Division of Tasmania. On 2 October 1903, the Division was split into five Divisions, with one of them being Wilmot. It was first contested at the 1903 Federal election. At the electoral redistribution of 12 September 1984, it was abolished and replaced by the Division of Lyons, to jointly honour Joseph Lyons, the tenth Prime Minister of Australia, who held Wilmot at the federal level from 1929–1939 and at the state level from 1909 to 1929, and his wife Dame Enid Lyons, the first woman elected to the Australian House of Representatives in 1943 and subsequently the first female member of Cabinet (1949–51).

Since the 1922 redistribution until its cessation, the Division was located in central Tasmania. At various times, the Division included the towns of Deloraine, Beaconsfield, Devonport, Latrobe, and New Norfolk. Prior to 1921, it only covered a smaller section in the northern Tasmania around the Devonport area. However, in 1922, it was massively expanded to the south to border the city of Hobart, gaining areas in central Tasmania from the Division of Franklin. However, at the same time, it lost Devonport to the neighbouring Division of Darwin (now Division of Braddon).

== Members ==
Image	Member	Party	Term	Notes
	Sir Edward Braddon (1829–1904)	Free Trade	16 December 1903 – 2 February 1904	Previously held the Division of Tasmania. Died in office
	Norman Cameron (1851–1931)	Free Trade	26 February 1904 – 1906	Previously held the Division of Tasmania. Lost seat. Later elected to the Tasmanian House of Assembly seat of Wilmot in 1912
	Norman Cameron (1851–1931)	Anti-Socialist	1906 – 1906	Previously held the Division of Tasmania. Lost seat. Later elected to the Tasmanian House of Assembly seat of Wilmot in 1912
	Norman Cameron (1851–1931)	Independent Anti-Socialist	1906 – 12 December 1906	Previously held the Division of Tasmania. Lost seat. Later elected to the Tasmanian House of Assembly seat of Wilmot in 1912
	Llewellyn Atkinson (1867–1945)	Anti-Socialist	12 December 1906 – 26 May 1909	Served as minister under Bruce. Lost seat. Later elected to the Tasmanian Legislative Council in 1931
	Llewellyn Atkinson (1867–1945)	Liberal	26 May 1909 – 17 February 1917	Served as minister under Bruce. Lost seat. Later elected to the Tasmanian Legislative Council in 1931
	Llewellyn Atkinson (1867–1945)	Nationalist	17 February 1917 – 24 October 1922	Served as minister under Bruce. Lost seat. Later elected to the Tasmanian Legislative Council in 1931
	Llewellyn Atkinson (1867–1945)	Country	24 October 1922 – 25 June 1926	Served as minister under Bruce. Lost seat. Later elected to the Tasmanian Legislative Council in 1931
	Llewellyn Atkinson (1867–1945)	Independent	25 June 1926– 17 March 1927	Served as minister under Bruce. Lost seat. Later elected to the Tasmanian Legislative Council in 1931
	Llewellyn Atkinson (1867–1945)	Nationalist	17 March 1927 – 12 October 1929	Served as minister under Bruce. Lost seat. Later elected to the Tasmanian Legislative Council in 1931
	Joseph Lyons (1879–1939)	Labor	12 October 1929 – March 1931	Previously held the Tasmanian House of Assembly seat of Wilmot. Served as minister under Scullin. Served as Opposition Leader from 1931 to 1932. Served as Prime Minister from 1932 to 1939. Died in office
	Joseph Lyons (1879–1939)	Independent	March 1931 – 7 May 1931	Previously held the Tasmanian House of Assembly seat of Wilmot. Served as minister under Scullin. Served as Opposition Leader from 1931 to 1932. Served as Prime Minister from 1932 to 1939. Died in office
	Joseph Lyons (1879–1939)	United Australia	7 May 1931 – 7 April 1939	Previously held the Tasmanian House of Assembly seat of Wilmot. Served as minister under Scullin. Served as Opposition Leader from 1931 to 1932. Served as Prime Minister from 1932 to 1939. Died in office
	Lancelot Spurr (1897–1965)	Labor	27 May 1939 – 21 September 1940	Lost seat. Later elected to the Tasmanian House of Assembly seat of Wilmot in 1941
	Allan Guy (1890–1979)	United Australia	21 September 1940 – 21 February 1945	Previously held the Division of Bass. Served as Chief Government Whip in the House under Menzies and Fadden. Lost seat. Later elected to the Senate in 1949
	Allan Guy (1890–1979)	Liberal	21 February 1945 – 28 September 1946	Previously held the Division of Bass. Served as Chief Government Whip in the House under Menzies and Fadden. Lost seat. Later elected to the Senate in 1949
	Gil Duthie (1912–1998)	Labor	28 September 1946 – 13 December 1975	Lost seat
	Max Burr (1939–)	Liberal	13 December 1975 – 1 December 1984	Transferred to the Division of Lyons after Wilmot was abolished in 1984
