= Lancelot Spurr =

Australian politician

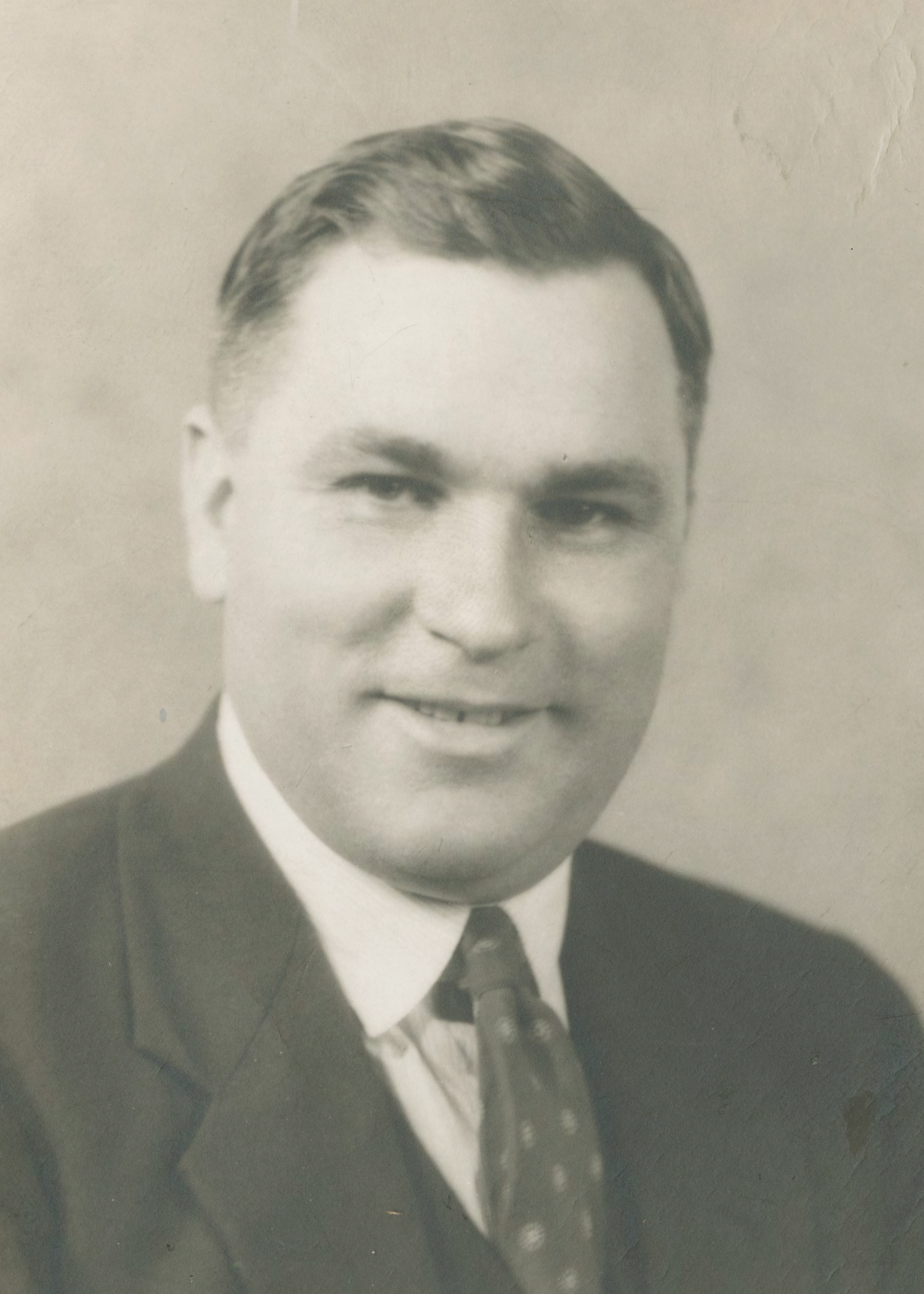
- Spurr in 1939

16th Speaker of the Tasmanian House of Assembly
- In office 7 June 1950 – 12 April 1955
- Preceded by: Bill Wedd
- Succeeded by: Horace Strutt

Member of the Tasmanian House of Assembly for Wilmot
- In office 8 May 1941 – 13 October 1956

Member of the Australian Parliament for Wilmot
- In office 27 May 1939 – 21 September 1940
- Preceded by: Joseph Lyons
- Succeeded by: Allan Guy

Personal details
- Born: 17 March 1897 Deloraine, Tasmania
- Died: 30 May 1965 (aged 68) Melbourne, Victoria, Australia
- Party: Australian Labor Party
- Occupation: Draper

Lancelot Thomas Spurr (17 March 1897 – 30 May 1965) was an Australian politician. He was an Australian Labor Party member of the Australian House of Representatives from 1939 to 1940 and the Tasmanian House of Assembly from 1941 to 1956. He was Speaker of the Tasmanian House of Assembly from 1950 to 1955.

Born in Deloraine, Tasmania, he was educated at Catholic schools and became a draper in Deloraine. He operated his own men's and boys' drapery store for many years, moving through several sites in Deloraine until converting the town's delicensed Railway Hotel into a new store in 1940. He was active in local sporting circles, serving as president of the Deloraine Wanderers Football Club and as secretary of the Deloraine Athletic Club. He was also the president of the Deloraine branch of the Labor Party. He unsuccessfully stood for parliament three times - two state and one federal - prior to his eventual election.

In 1939, he was elected to the Australian House of Representatives in a by-election for the United Australia Party-held seat of Wilmot (caused by the death of Prime Minister Joseph Lyons); Spurr contested the seat for the Labor Party and defeated three UAP candidates (including former MPs Donald Charles Cameron and Allan Guy) to narrowly take the seat. In the 1940 election, however, Spurr was defeated by Guy.

The following year he was elected to the Tasmanian House of Assembly, and he served as Speaker from 1950 to 1955, retiring from politics in 1956. He died in 1965.

Parliament of Australia
Preceded by Joseph Lyons	Member for Wilmot; 1939–1940	Succeeded by Allan Guy
Tasmanian House of Assembly
Preceded by Bill Wedd	Speaker of the Tasmanian House of Assembly; 1950–1955	Succeeded by Horace Strutt
