= Gil Duthie =

Australian politician (1912–1998)

Gil Duthie AM
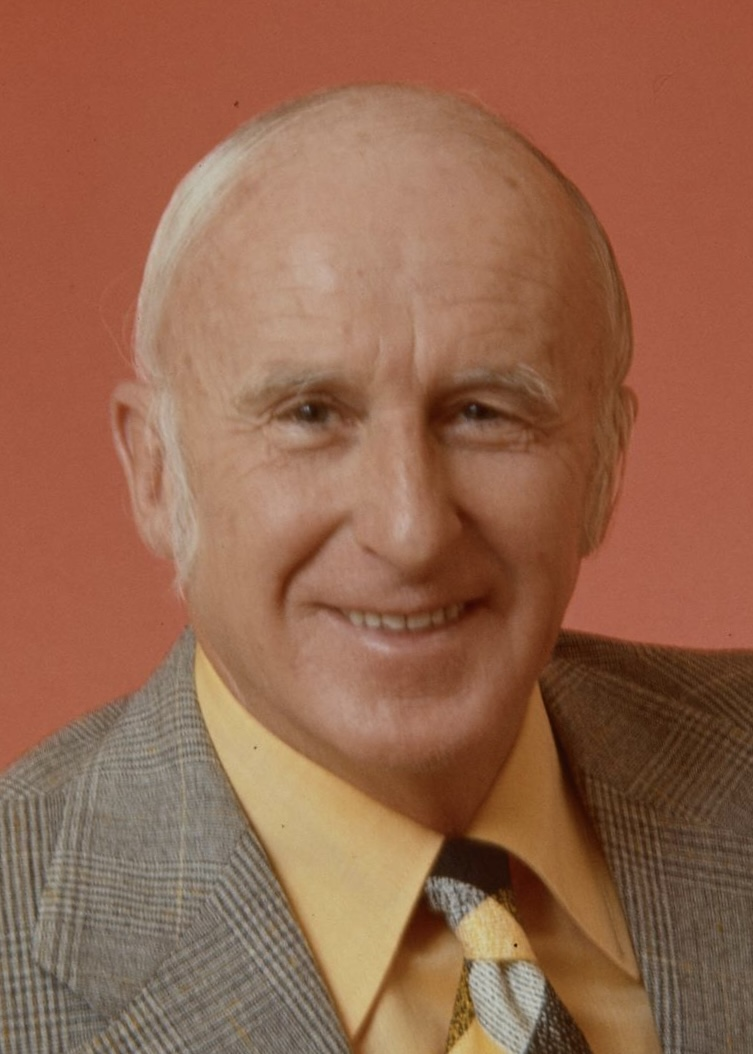

Chief Whip of the Labor Party in the House of Representatives
- In office 13 February 1956 – 18 December 1972
- Preceded by: Fred Daly
- Succeeded by: Brendan Hansen

Member of the Australian Parliament for Wilmot
- In office 28 September 1946 – 13 December 1975
- Preceded by: Allan Guy
- Succeeded by: Max Burr

Personal details
- Born: 21 May 1912 Nhill, Victoria
- Died: 13 June 1998 (aged 86)
- Party: Australian Labor Party
- Occupation: Schoolteacher, religious minister

Gilbert William Arthur Duthie AM (21 May 1912 – 13 June 1998) was an Australian politician. Born in Nhill, Victoria, he was educated at state schools and at the University of Melbourne before becoming a schoolteacher and farmer in rural Victoria. In 1938 he was ordained a Methodist minister, and in 1944 he moved to Latrobe, Tasmania. In 1945 and 1946 Duthie was directly involved with Australian rules football in the town. He was secretary of the Latrobe Football Club as well as playing senior games for it in the NWFU competition.

In 1946, Gil Duthie was elected to the Australian House of Representatives as the Labor member for Wilmot, defeating sitting Liberal MP Allan Guy. From February 1956 until December 1972 he was the Labor Party Whip in the House. He held the seat until 1975, when he was defeated by Liberal candidate Max Burr. Duthie died in 1998.

Parliament of Australia
Preceded by Allan Guy	Member for Wilmot; 1946 – 1975	Succeeded by Max Burr
