= James Guy (Australian politician) =

Australian politician (1860–1921)

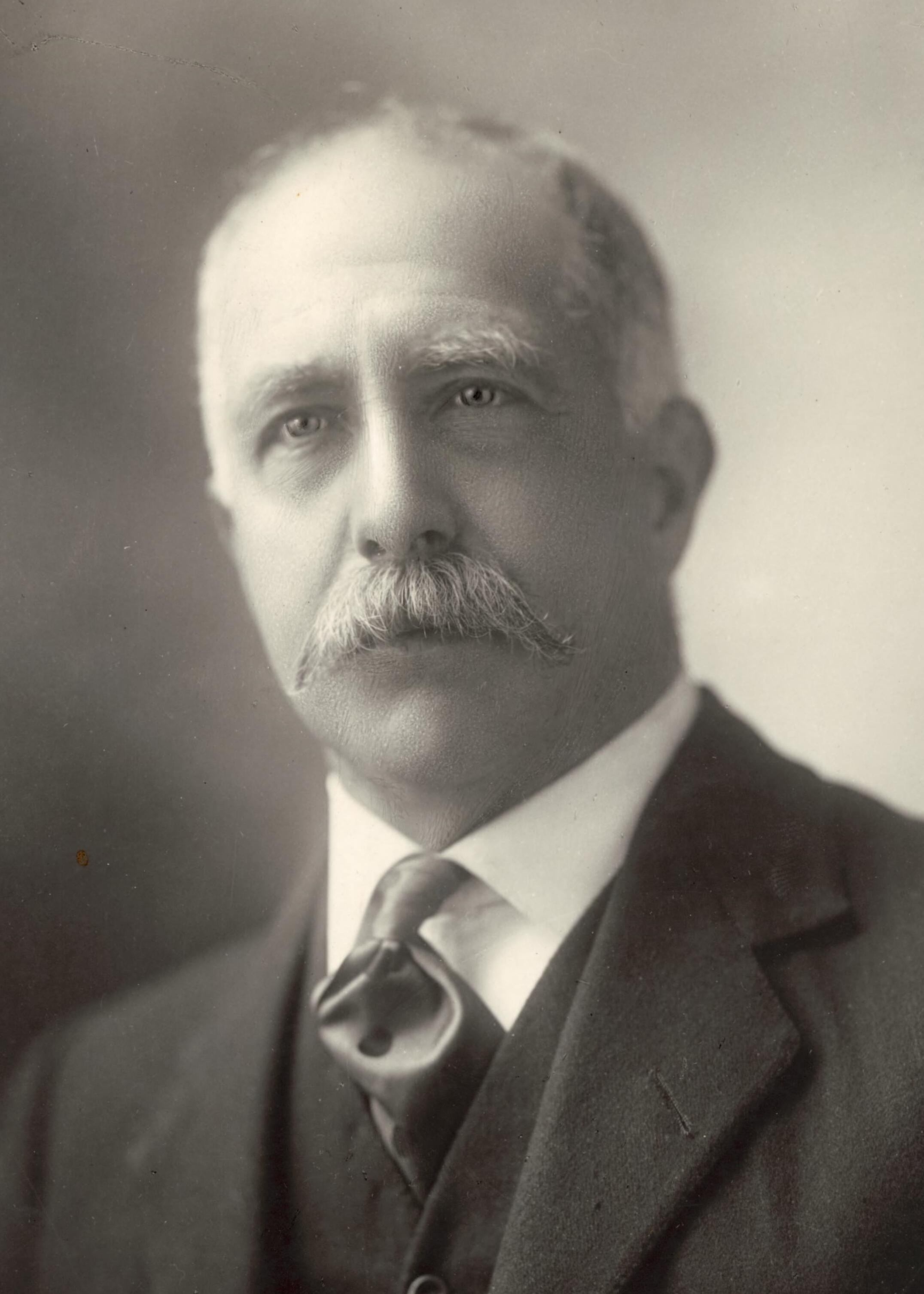

Senator for Tasmania
- In office 5 September 1914 – 30 June 1920

Member of the Tasmanian House of Assembly for Bass
- In office 30 April 1909 – 23 January 1913
- Succeeded by: Arthur Anderson

Personal details
- Born: 13 November 1860 Launceston, Tasmania, Australia
- Died: 23 August 1921 (aged 60) Launceston, Tasmania, Australia
- Party: Labor
- Spouse: Margaret McElwee (m. 1884)
- Relations: George McElwee (brother-in-law)
- Children: 5, including Allan
- Occupation: Blacksmith; politician

James Guy (13 November 1860 – 23 August 1921) was an Australian politician. A blacksmith by profession, he was one of the founders of the Tasmanian Labor Party in 1903 and held senior office in the party for nearly two decades. He was a member of the Tasmanian House of Assembly from 1909 to 1913 and a Senator for Tasmania from 1914 to 1920. His son Allan Guy followed him into politics.

== Early life ==
Guy was born on 13 November 1860 in Launceston, Tasmania, the oldest of twelve children born to Margaret (née Polock) and Andrew Guy. He was educated at state schools and then began working as a blacksmith for W. Gurr and Son.

== State politics ==
In 1903, Guy helped establish the Tasmanian Workers' Political League, the predecessor of the modern Australian Labor Party (ALP), and was elected as the organisation's inaugural treasurer. He later served as president (1904–1906, 1908) and general secretary (1909–1921).

Guy was elected to the Tasmanian House of Assembly at the 1909 state election, winning the most votes in Bass. In parliament he supported the abolition of the Legislative Council, higher salaries for MPs, and the implementation of wage controls. His share of the vote fell in 1912 and he lost his seat at a snap election the following year.

== Federal politics ==
After standing unsuccessfully for the Senate in 1906 and 1913, Guy was elected to a six-year term at the 1914 double dissolution election. He spoke frequently on social policy, supporting the establishment of widow's pensions and full prohibition of alcohol, specifically "the importation, manufacture, and sale of wines, beer, and spirituous liquors throughout the Commonwealth". He described the establishment of the Commonwealth Bank as "the greatest piece of legislation ever enacted in the world's history". During World War I, Guy reluctantly supported the war effort but was strongly opposed to any form of conscription. In the lead-up to the 1916 conscription referendum he described overseas conscription as "iniquitous, oppressive, hateful, and repulsive".

Guy remained with the ALP following the party split of 1916, serving in the Senate until 30 June 1920 following his defeat at the 1919 election. In 1917, there were rumours he had feigned illness in order to allow the Hughes government scope to cancel the upcoming federal election. He "emphatically denied" that he had done so.

== Personal life ==
Guy married Margaret McElwee in Launceston on 13 November 1884. The couple had one daughter and four sons together. His son Allan Guy and brother-in-law George McElwee were also members of parliament. He and his son are one of only two father-son pairs to both serve as senators, along with Joseph and Edward Vardon.

Outside of politics, Guy was a trustee of the Chalmers Presbyterian Church in Launceston and taught Sunday school. He was also chairman of the Launceston United Friendly Societies' Dispensary, a director of the Permanent Building Society, and secretary of the Independent Order of Rechabites. He was in poor health at the time of his defeat and died at his home in Inveresk on 23 August 1921.
