= Francis Valentine =

Australian politician

48th Mayor of Hobart
- In office 1925–1926
- Preceded by: John Soundy
- Succeeded by: Edwin J. Rogers, C.M.G.

Member of the Tasmanian House of Assembly for Denison
- In office 30 April 1912 – 23 January 1913
- Preceded by: Edward Crowther
- Succeeded by: William Fullerton

Personal details
- Born: 24 August 1863
- Died: 22 May 1941 (aged 77) Hobart
- Party: Liberal

Francis David Valentine (24 August 1863 – 22 May 1941) was an Australian politician.

He was born in Hobart. In 1912 he was elected to the Tasmanian House of Assembly as a Liberal member for Denison. He was defeated in 1913. He was elected as an alderman to the City of Hobart local government area between 1920 and 1932 and was the mayor from 1925 to 1926. Valentine died in Hobart in 1941.

Civic offices
Preceded by John Soundy	Mayor of Hobart; 1925–1926	Succeeded by Edwin J. Rogers, C.M.G.
