= Tasmanian Farmers and Graziers Association =

- Formation: 14 May 1980
- Type: Peak body
- Headquarters: Launceston, Tasmania, Australia
- Website: www.tfga.com.au

The Tasmanian Farmers and Graziers Association (TFGA) is the peak body for the agricultural industry in the Australian state of Tasmania. It is a member of the National Farmers Federation.

== History ==
The Tasmanian Farmers and Stockowners Association (TFSA) was established in 1908 by pastoralist Albert Mansell, "in response to union militancy and the detrimental impact of Federation" on local agriculture. It was renamed the Tasmanian Farmers, Stockowners and Orchardists Association (TFSOA) in 1919 and by 1930 reportedly had over 1,000 members across 19 branches.

In August 1946, the Tasmanian Farmers Federation (TFF) was established as a merger of the Tasmanian Producers' Organisation (TPO) and the Primary Producers' Union (PPU), at a unity conference in Launceston. The TPO had been established in 1936 as a merger of the Agricultural Bureau and the Tasmanian Farmers' Union, following a conference in Devonport. The TFU in turn was established in Burnie in 1919.

On 14 May 1980, the TFSOA and TFF amalgamated to form the TFGA. Agreement for the merger had been reached in March 1979 with the support of the National Farmers' Federation, although a merger had been proposed for almost 20 years.

== Activities ==
As of 2022, the TFGA aims to provide "a united voice for Tasmanian farmers to ensure the growth, sustainability and profitability of the agriculture industry in Tasmania".

The initial focus of the TFSA was on livestock, but its activities later expanded to encompass the wider agricultural industry. It established committees on crop marketing, pest control, freight issues, stock diseases and brands, immigration, bushfires, and meat export, and lobbied for additional funding on agricultural research. In the 1920s, as with similar organisations in other states, the TFSOA helped establish a local branch of the Country Party, but the party was short-lived in Tasmania and the TFSOA later returned to neutral status with regard to political parties.

== See also ==
- Agriculture in Australia
