= Richard Field (politician) =

Australian politician

Richard Charles Field (5 November 1866 – 26 January 1961) was an Australian politician.

== Biography ==
Field was born in Westbury in Tasmania, the son of Thomas Field. In 1909 he was elected to the Tasmanian House of Assembly as an Anti-Socialist member for Wilmot. He was defeated in 1912. Field died in Launceston in 1961.
