= Richard Franks =

Australian politician

Richard Franks (11 April 1870 – 3 July 1938) was an Australian politician.

He was born in Beckington in Somerset. His Father was James Franks (Note: Frome, Somerset, England, United Kingdom (1834 – 1913)) and mother Esther Dainton. (Note: Goose Street, Frome, Somerset, England, United Kingdom (1830 – 1919)) In 1922 he was elected to the Tasmanian House of Assembly as a Country Party member for Darwin. He retired in 1925. Franks died in Elliott in 1938.
