= Alicia O'Shea Petersen =

Tasmanian suffragist and social reformer

Alicia Teresa Jane O'Shea Petersen (née McShane; 2 July 1862 – 22 January 1923) was an Australian suffragist and social reformer. She was both the first woman to stand for the Parliament of Tasmania and the first woman to stand for a Tasmanian seat in the Parliament of Australia.

== Early life ==
Alicia Teresa Jane McShane was born in Tasmania to Hugh and Jane (née Wood) McShane. She became interested in women's and labour rights as a result of her own work in sweatshops. She was also influenced by her cousin, John Earle, who founded the Workers' Political League and became the first Labor Premier of Tasmania in 1909.

== Public life ==
Petersen was the first woman in Tasmania to stand as a political candidate, contesting the federal seat of Denison in 1913 as an independent. In 1922, when women were first eligible to stand for the Tasmanian House of Assembly, she was a political candidate in Denison, again as an independent.

As vice-president of the Women's Health Association, Petersen was instigator of both child welfare work and bush nursing in Tasmania. She was on the executive of the National Council of Women and the Tasmanian council of the Workers' Educational Association until her death.

== Personal life ==
Petersen was twice married. On 28 May 1884, she married widower Patrick Robert O'Shea at St Joseph's Church, Hobart. Following a long illness, he died in March 1886, aged 39. She then married a mining investor named William Petersen at her home, Wilmott Terrace, Hobart on 16 December 1891. He died in 1912.

Petersen died on 22 January 1923 at her home, Wilmott Terrace, 18 Harrington Street, Hobart.
