= Frederick Burbury =

Australian politician

Frederick Burbury (20 November 1861 – 20 June 1956) was an Australian politician.

He was born in Andover. In 1916, he was elected to the Tasmanian House of Assembly as a Liberal member for Franklin. He retired in 1919. Burbury died in Campbell Town in 1956.
