= William Connell (Australian politician) =

Australian politician

William John Connell (21 January 1891 – 14 April 1945) was an Australian politician.

He was born in Launceston. In January 1919 he was elected to the Tasmanian House of Assembly as a Nationalist member for Wilmot in a recount following Edward Mulcahy's resignation. He was defeated at the state election held in May 1919. Connell died in St Leonards in 1945.
