= William Pearce (Australian politician) =

Australian politician

William Warburton Frederick Pearce (26 October 1855 – 26 June 1922) was an Australian politician.

He was born in Hobart. On 10 June 1922 he was elected to the Tasmanian House of Assembly as a Labor member for Franklin; however, he died sixteen days later before taking his seat.
