= 1912 Tasmanian state election =

State election in Australia

- 30 April 1912

All 30 seats to the House of Assembly
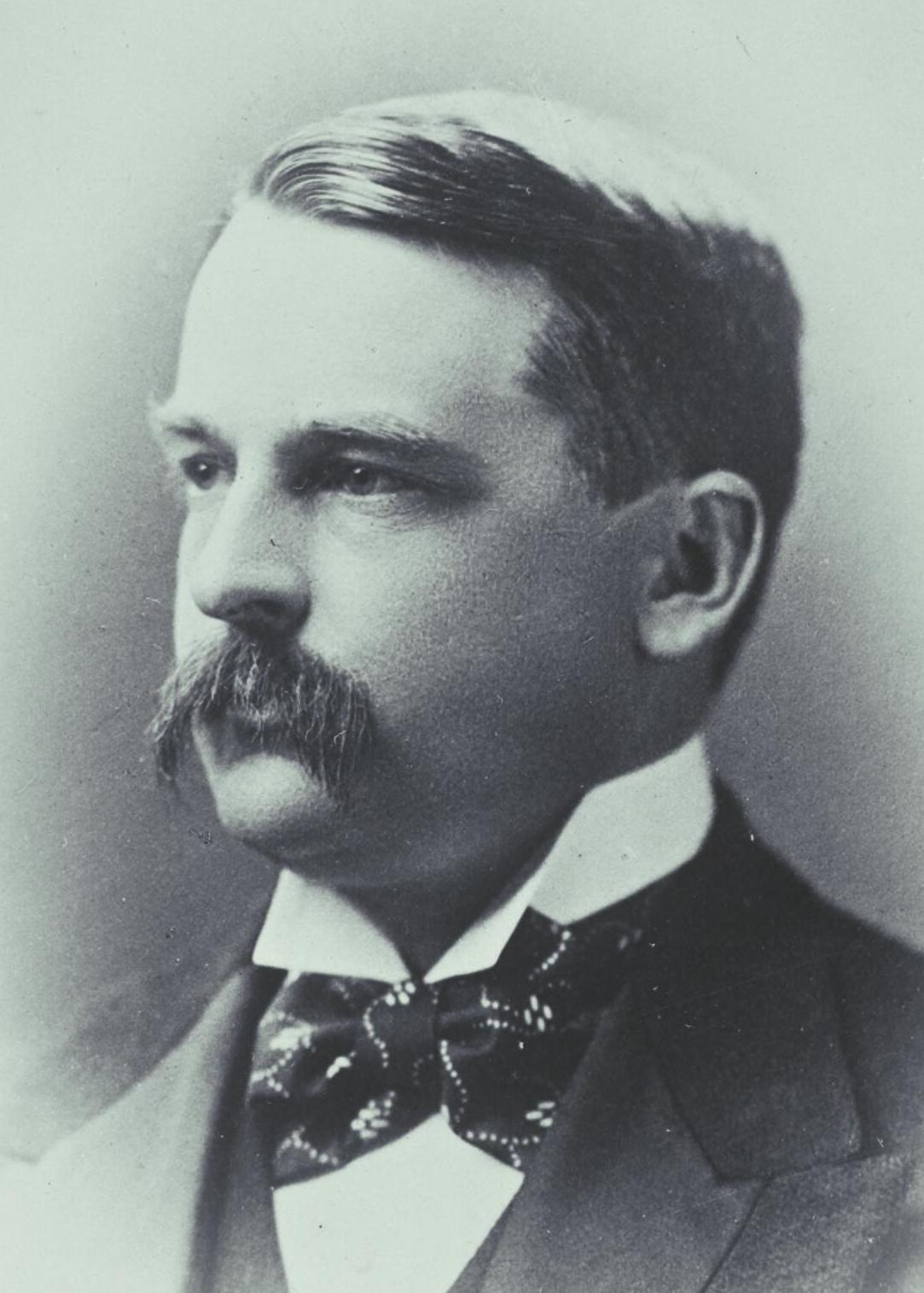

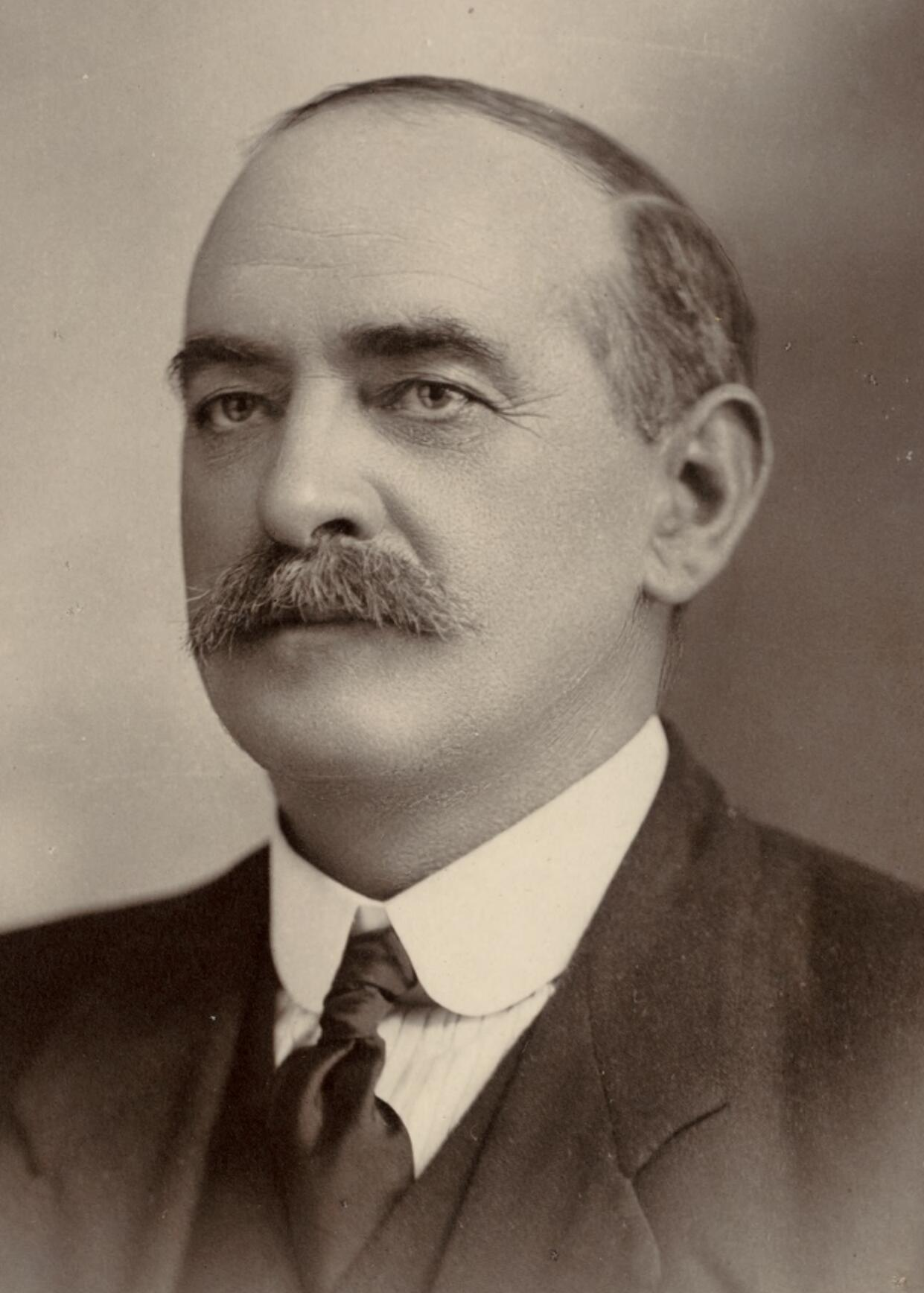
	First party	Second party
Leader	Elliott Lewis	John Earle
Party	Liberal	Labor
Leader since	1909	1906
Leader's seat	Denison	Franklin
Last election	18 seats	12 seats
Seats won	16 seats	14 seats
Seat change	▼2	▲2
Percentage	54.48%	45.54%
Swing	▲3.87	▲6.58
- Results of the election
Premier before election
Elliott Lewis
Liberal
Elected Premier
Elliott Lewis
Liberal

The 1912 Tasmanian state election was held on Tuesday, 30 April 1912 in the Australian state of Tasmania to elect 30 members of the Tasmanian House of Assembly. The election used the Hare-Clark proportional representation system — six members were elected from each of five electorates.

Elliott Lewis was elected as an Anti-Socialist at the 1909 election, and was Premier of Tasmania from 27 October 1909. He was urged by his predecessor, John Evans (premier from 11 July 1904 to 19 June 1909), to organise anti-Labor forces against a resurgent Labor Party (which won 12 seats at the 1909 election) and to support the formation of the Tasmanian Liberal League (not directly related to the modern Liberal Party).

Lewis was the incumbent Premier at the 1912 election, and John Earle was Labor Party leader. The election saw an increase in Labor seats from 12 to 14, just short of a House of Assembly majority. The Liberal Party won the election, with a two-seat majority. Despite leading the Liberals to victory, Lewis was criticised within the party, and resigned the leadership to Albert Solomon on 14 June the same year.

== Key dates ==
Date	Event
23 March 1912	New electoral rolls came into force.
4 April 1912	The Parliament was dissolved.
30 April 1912	Polling day, between the hours of 8am and 6pm.
14 June 1912	Elliott Lewis resigned, succeeded by Albert Solomon.
2 July 1912	Parliament was summoned for business.

== Results ==
Party	Votes	%	+/–	Seats	+/–
Liberal	40,252	54.48	+3.87	16	▼2
Labor	33,634	45.52	+6.58	14	▲2
Total	73,886	100.00	–	30	–
Valid votes	73,886	97.15			
Invalid/blank votes	2,166	2.85	-0.01		
Total votes	76,052	100.00	–		
Registered voters/turnout	103,513	73.47	+20.85		

Popular vote
Liberal	54.48%
Labor	45.52%

Seats
Liberal	53.33%
Labor	46.67%

== Distribution of seats ==
Electorate	Seats won
Bass	
Darwin	
Denison	
Franklin	
Wilmot	

Labor
Liberal

== See also ==
- Members of the Tasmanian House of Assembly, 1912–1913
- Candidates of the 1912 Tasmanian state election
