= William Dixon (Australian politician) =

Australian politician

William Henry Dixon (28 May 1860 – 18 May 1935) was an Australian politician. He was born in Ouse, Tasmania. In 1919 he was elected to the Tasmanian House of Assembly as a Nationalist member for Franklin, joining the Country Party when it was formed in 1920. He was defeated in 1922. Dixon died in Sydney in 1935.
