= 1919 Tasmanian state election =

State election in Australia

- 31 May 1919

All 30 seats to the House of Assembly
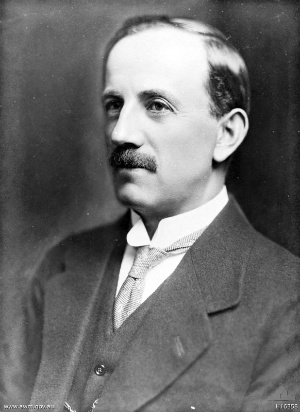

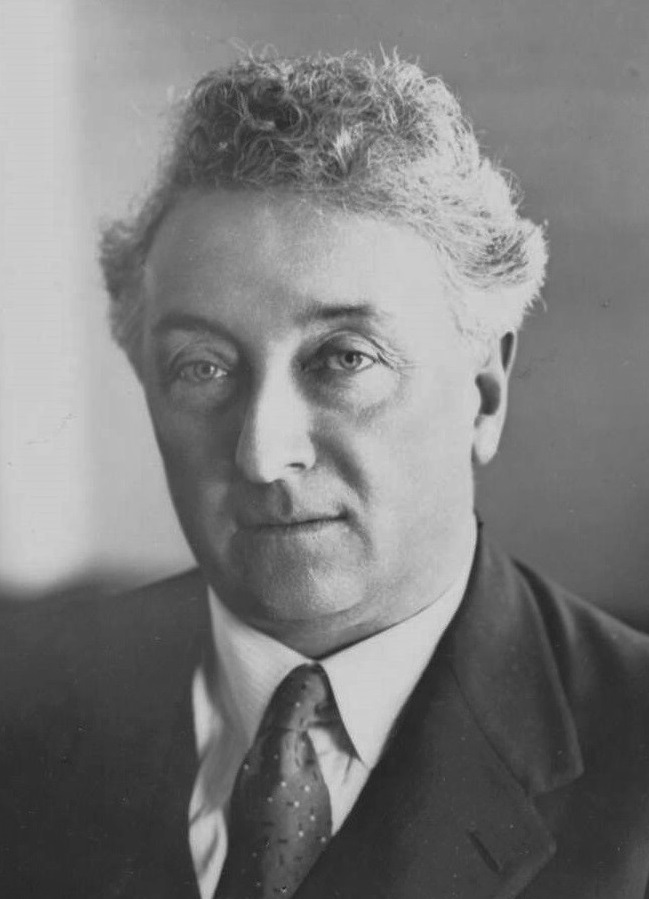
	First party	Second party
Leader	Walter Lee	Joseph Lyons
Party	Nationalist	Labor
Leader since	September 1915	November 1916
Leader's seat	Wilmot	Wilmot
Last election	15 seats	14 seats
Seats won	16 seats	13 seats
Seat change	▲1	▼1
Percentage	55.20%	41.44%
Swing	▲6.97	▼7.03
- Results of the election
Premier before election
Walter Lee
Nationalist
Elected Premier
Walter Lee
Nationalist

The 1919 Tasmanian state election was held on 31 May 1919 in the Australian state of Tasmania to elect 30 members of the Tasmanian House of Assembly. The election used the Hare-Clark proportional representation system — six members were elected from each of five electorates.

By the 1919 election, the Liberal Party had regrouped and been renamed as the Nationalist Party. The Premier of Tasmania, Walter Lee, had led the party for a relatively untroubled three years, despite the Liberals' one-seat majority over Labor and the uncertainty of World War I.

The Labor Party in Tasmania went into the 1919 election led by Joseph Lyons. Lee led the Nationalist Party to victory, with a 14% margin over Labor, although they only won 16 of the 30 seats in the House of Assembly. Independent Joshua Whitsitt retained his seat.

== Results ==
Party	Votes	%	+/–	Seats	+/–
Nationalist	37,677	55.20	▲6.97	16	▲1
Labor	28,286	41.44	▼7.03	13	▼1
Independents	2,289	3.35	▲0.05	1	Steady
Total	68,252	100.00	–	30	–
Valid votes	68,252	96.04			
Invalid/blank votes	2,814	3.96	▼1.70		
Total votes	71,066	100.00	–		
Registered voters/turnout	107,541	66.08	▼7.52		

Popular vote
Nationalist	55.20%
Labor	41.44%
Independents	3.35%

Seats
Nationalist	53.33%
Labor	43.33%
Independents	3.33%

== Distribution of votes ==
=== Primary vote by division ===
	Bass	Darwin	Denison	Franklin	Wilmot
Labor Party	37.9%	47.5%	44.3%	44.9%	30.2%
Nationalist	62.1%	37.2%	55.7%	52.0%	69.8%
Other	–	15.3%	–	3.2%	–

=== Distribution of seats ===
Electorate	Seats won
Bass	
Darwin	
Denison	
Franklin	
Wilmot	

Labor
Nationalist
Independent

== See also ==
- Members of the Tasmanian House of Assembly, 1919–1922
- Candidates of the 1919 Tasmanian state election
