= Percy Pollard =

Australian politician

Percival George Pollard (16 June 1883 – 19 May 1948) was an Australian politician.

He was born in Angaston in South Australia. In 1917 he was elected to the Tasmanian House of Assembly as a Nationalist member for Darwin in a recount following the resignation of Benjamin Watkins. Defeated in 1919, he returned in 1920 in another recount, this one following the resignation of Herbert Payne. Pollard was defeated again in 1922. He died in Devonport in 1948.
