= James Hurst (politician) =

Australian politician

James Abraham Hurst (29 December 1880 – 1 April 1964) was an Australian politician. He was born in Zeehan, Tasmania. In 1910 he was elected to the Tasmanian House of Assembly as a Labor member for Darwin, Tasmania. He was defeated in 1912 but returned to the House in 1919, serving in the Lyons Labor government until his resignation in 1926. Hurst died in 1964 at Warragul, Victoria.
