= Allan Guy =

Australian politician (1890–1979)

The Honourable Allan Guy CBE
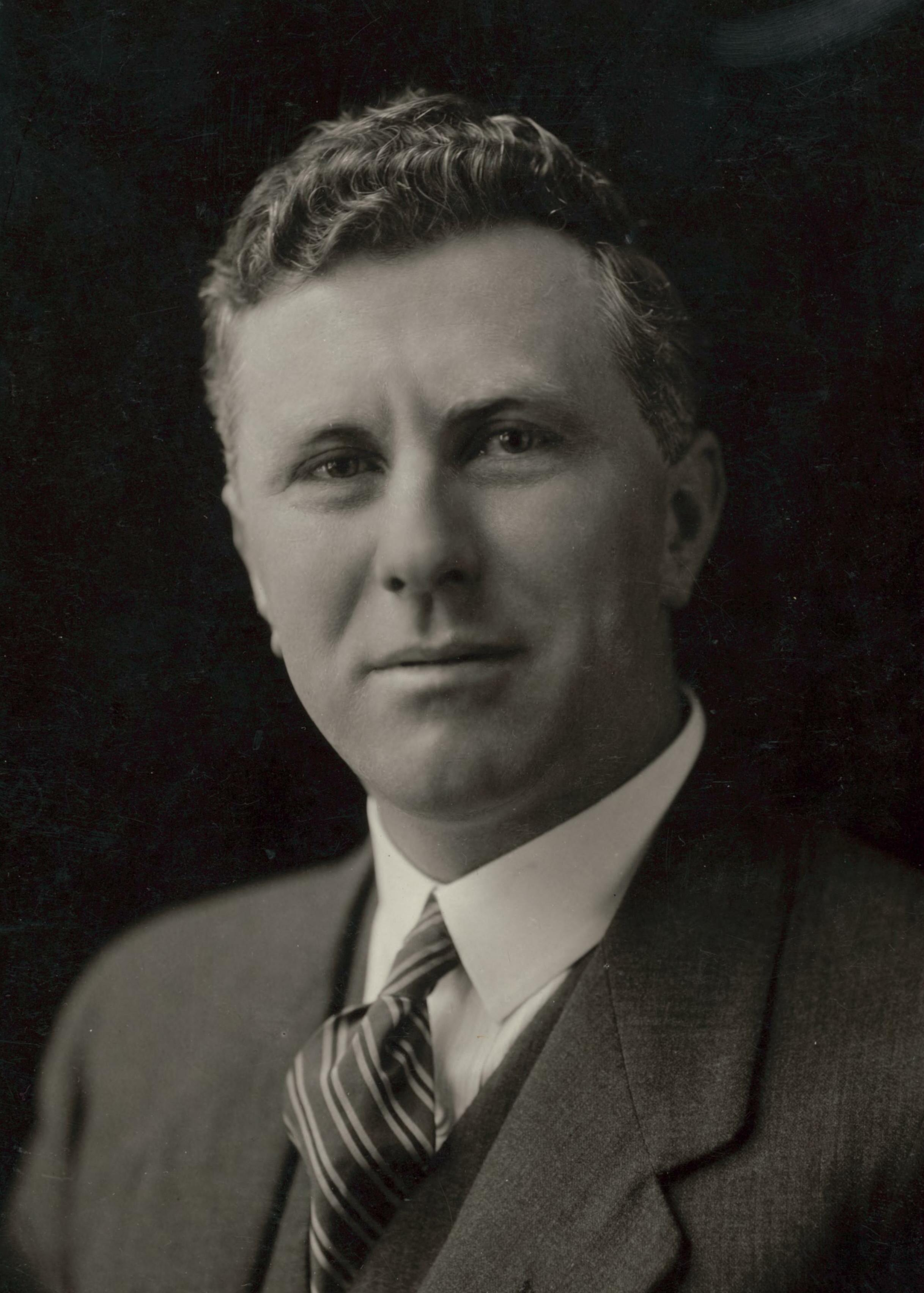
- Portrait of Guy, c. 1930s

Senator for Tasmania
- In office 22 February 1950 – 30 June 1956
- Preceded by: None (Note: New seat created, effective 22 February 1950, as part of the expansion of Parliament approved in the Representation Act 1948)
- Succeeded by: Bob Poke

Member of the Australian Parliament for Wilmot
- In office 21 September 1940 – 28 September 1946
- Preceded by: Lancelot Spurr
- Succeeded by: Gil Duthie

Member of the Australian Parliament for Bass
- In office 12 October 1929 – 15 September 1934
- Preceded by: Syd Jackson
- Succeeded by: Claude Barnard

Personal details
- Born: James Allan Guy; 30 November 1890 Launceston, Tasmania
- Died: 16 December 1979 (aged 89)
- Party: Labor (1929–31); UAP (1931–44); Liberal (1944–56)
- Parent: James Guy (father)

James Allan Guy, CBE (30 November 1890 – 16 December 1979) was an Australian politician who represented the Australian Labor Party in both the Tasmanian House of Assembly and the Federal House of Representatives, before leaving to represent the United Australia Party and then the Liberal Party of Australia in both the House of Representatives and the Senate. His father, James Guy, had also been a Senator.

== Early life ==
Guy was born on 30 November 1890 in Launceston, Tasmania. He was the son of Margaret (née McElwee) and James Guy. His father, a blacksmith by profession, was one of the founders of the Australian Labor Party (Tasmanian Branch) and represented Tasmania in the Senate from 1914 to 1920. His uncle George McElwee would be elected to the Tasmanian Legislative Council in 1940.

Guy was educated at Invermay Primary School and after leaving school worked as a butcher. He was the state secretary of the Australasian Meat Industries Employees' Union from 1911 to 1916 and served on the Butchers' Wages Board. He was also treasurer of the Launceston Trades and Labor Council.

== State politics ==
Guy was elected to the Division of Bass in the Tasmanian House of Assembly in 1916 and was part of Joseph Lyons' cabinet when Labor came to power in 1923. He served as Chief Secretary (1923–28), Minister for Mines (1923–24), Minister for Railways (1924–28), and Deputy Premier. Lyons was severely injured in a car accident in July 1926, and Guy was acting premier for four months in his absence. Michael O'Keefe, the Speaker of the House of Assembly, was killed in the same accident. When Labor lost the 1928 election, Guy became Deputy Leader of the Opposition. He remained in the Tasmanian parliament until 1929.

== Federal politics ==
In 1929 he contested and won the Federal Division of Bass for Labor and joined James Scullin's government. In 1931 he joined Joseph Lyons, James Fenton and two other Labor members in forming the United Australia Party along with the Nationalist Party of Australia opposition, which came to office in December with Lyons as prime minister. In 1932 Lyons rewarded him for his loyalty by appointing him assistant Minister for Trade and Customs. One of Guy's responsibilities was to defend film-censorship provisions which he described as 'both necessary and admirable', for, without them, 'all sorts of puerile and undesirable films could be displayed, to the detriment, not only of our civilization, but of the Christian religion'.

After losing his seat in the 1934 election, Guy contested it unsuccessfully in 1937, and then the Division of Wilmot unsuccessfully in 1939, before winning it in 1940. He represented Wilmot for the UAP until 1944 and for the Liberal Party until 1946.

In 1949 he was elected to the Australian Senate as a Liberal, where he remained until being defeated in the 1956 election.

== Personal life ==
He was appointed a CBE in 1968 for services to "Parliament and the community."

== Notes ==
Tasmanian House of Assembly
Preceded by James McDonald	Member for Bass; 1916–1929	Succeeded by Thomas Davies
Australian House of Representatives
Preceded by Syd Jackson	Member for Bass; 1929–1934	Succeeded by Claude Barnard
Preceded by Lancelot Spurr	Member for Wilmot; 1940–1946	Succeeded by Gil Duthie
Parliament of Australia
New seat	Senator for Tasmania; 1950–1956	Succeeded by Bob Poke
