= Herbert Hays =

Australian politician (1869–1960)

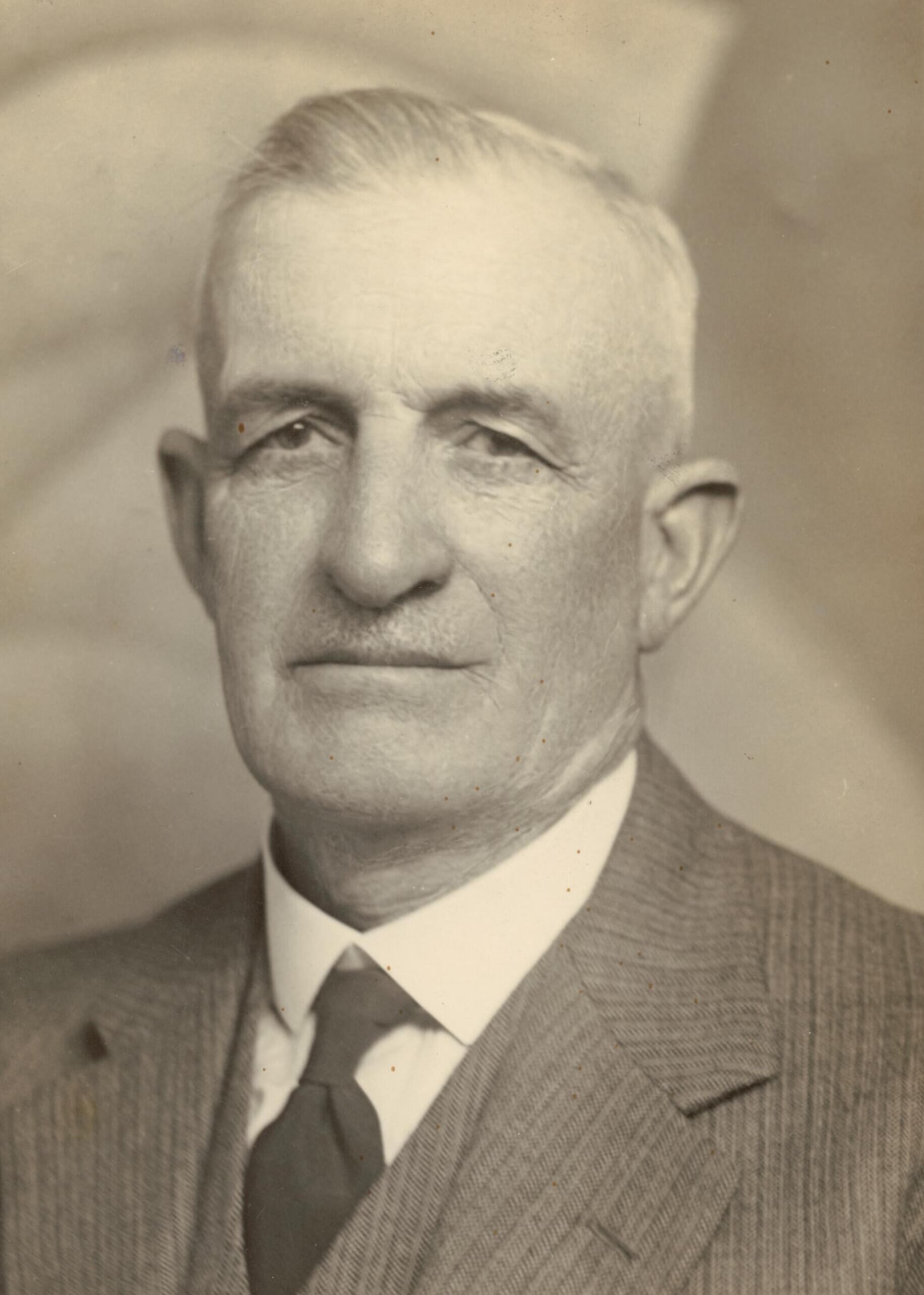

Senator for Tasmania
- In office 1 July 1923 – 30 June 1947

Personal details
- Born: 20 September 1869 Forth, Tasmania
- Died: 16 February 1960 (aged 90) Devonport, Tasmania, Australia
- Party: Nationalist (1923–31); UAP (1931–45); Liberal (1945–47)

Herbert Hays OBE (20 September 1869 – 16 February 1960) was an Australian politician.

Hays was born near Forth in Tasmania, and was educated at Don State School before becoming a farmer. He was chairman of the Don Road Trust and senior warden of the Mersey Marine Board. He also held office as a Freemason in their Grand Lodge of Tasmania and was a long-time member of the Independent Order of Rechabites.

Hays was elected to the Tasmanian House of Assembly as a member for Wilmot at a 1911 by-election, having nominated as a Liberal League candidate. He supported assistance for farmers, liberalising requirements for settlers of Crown lands, increased railway construction to allow new districts to be opened up for farming and for the construction of an experimental farm. He denounced preference to trade unionists in employment and advocated reducing taxation on landowners. Hays was re-elected at the 1912 election, at which time the Daily Telegraph described him as "essentially a representative of the agricultural industry."

He served as an Honorary Minister 1916–1922. In 1922, he transferred to federal politics, winning a Tasmanian seat in the Australian Senate as a Nationalist. In 1931, he joined the United Australia Party, successor to the Nationalists. Hays served as Chairman of Committees from 1932 to 1935. He was defeated in 1946 as a Liberal. Hays died in 1960.
