= Ernest Blyth =

Australian politician

Ernest Frederick Burns Blyth (11 July 1872 – 1 November 1933) was an Australian politician in Tasmania.

== Early life and marriage ==
Ernest was born in 1872 to schoolteacher William Crowther Blyth and Mary Ann (née Burns) of Honeywood, in the Huon district. Within a handful of years, the family moved to Campbell Town, where his father was appointed head teacher and stayed there for over 20 years. From a young age, Ernest had a literary interest, winning prizes for poetry, or being noted for his care when looking after books.

Ernest Blyth married Jessie Chepmell in Hobart on 14 April 1903. Over the next few years, a few children were born to the couple, Blyth working as an estate manager at the "Armistead" property at Kimberley.

== Political career ==
In 1913, he was elected to the Tasmanian House of Assembly as a Liberal member for Wilmot. A Nationalist from 1917, he joined the Country Party in 1922. He was appointed Minister for Lands and Mines, Soldier Settlement in August that year. In June 1923, there was a Cabinet re-shuffle and Blyth was appointed Chief Secretary and Minister for Mines.

Blyth was defeated in 1925, an electoral boundary change affecting his chances, and his time to conduct his campaign being affected by family bereavements.

== Later life and death ==
He died at home at Kimberley in 1933.
