= Michael O'Keefe (Tasmanian politician) =

Australian politician

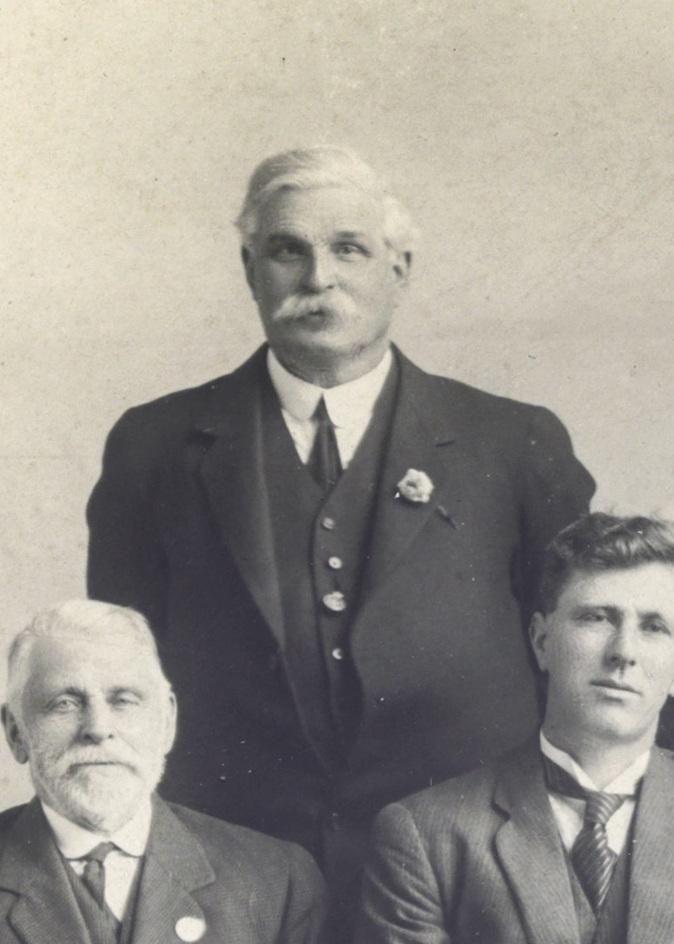

Speaker of the Tasmanian House of Assembly
- In office 28 July 1925 – 2 October 1926
- Preceded by: John Evans
- Succeeded by: Walter Woods

Member of the Tasmanian House of Assembly for Wilmot
- In office 30 April 1912 – 2 October 1926

Personal details
- Born: Michael Ignatius O'Keefe; 28 September 1864 Selbourne, Tasmania, Australia
- Died: 2 October 1926 (aged 62) Beaconsfield, Tasmania, Australia
- Party: Labor
- Occupation: Miner, politician, trade unionist

Michael Ignatius O'Keefe (28 September 1864 – 2 October 1926) was an Australian politician who served in the Tasmanian House of Assembly from 1912 until his death, representing the Labor Party.

O'Keefe was born in Selbourne, near Westbury, Tasmania. He married Beatrice Dutton in 1896, and had four children. Before entering politics, he worked as a miner at Beaconsfield and Gormanston. He was a branch secretary of the Amalgamated Miners' Association.

O'Keefe was elected to parliament at the 1912 state election, as one of the members for Wilmot. When Labor won the 1925 election, he was elected Speaker of the House. On 15 July 1926, O'Keefe suffered severe injuries when the car in which he was travelling collided with a goods train near Perth. He lingered for several months before dying in Beaconsfield on 2 October. Future prime minister Joseph Lyons was also injured in the crash.
