= Premiership of Jeremy Rockliff =

Period of government in Tasmania since 2022

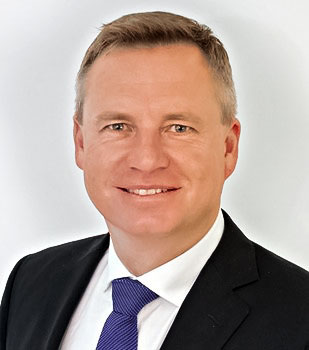
- Rockliff in 2022
- Premiership of Jeremy Rockliff; 8 April 2022 – 11 April 2024
- Governor: Barbara Baker
- Cabinet: Rockliff I
- Party: Liberal
- Election: 2021
- Appointed by: Governor Barbara Baker
- Seat: Executive Building, Hobart
- Second term 11 April 2024 – 11 August 2025
- Cabinet: Rockliff II
- Party: Liberal (supported) (Note: Supported by independents Miriam Beswick, Rebekah Pentland and David O'Byrne for the full term. Originally, Lambie member Andrew Jenner and independent Kristie Johnston also supported the government, but withdrew their support.)
- Election: 2024
- Appointed by: Governor Barbara Baker
- Third term 11 August 2025 – present
- Cabinet: Rockliff III
- Party: Liberal (supported) (Note: Independent member David O'Byrne has formally guaranteed confidence and supply to Rockliff. As well as this, in the August no-confidence motion, his government was supported by the entirety of the crossbench.)
- Election: 2025
- Appointed by: Governor Barbara Baker
- Coat of arms of Tasmania

The premiership of Jeremy Rockliff (also referred to as the Rockliff administration) began on 8 April 2022, when he was sworn in as Premier of Tasmania by Governor Barbara Baker following the resignation of his predecessor, Peter Gutwein. Rockliff previously served as deputy premier under the Hodgman and Gutwein governments.

On 5 June 2025, a motion of no confidence against him passed the parliament. He then announced that he would visit the governor Barbara Baker requesting a snap election, which was then called for 19 July 2025.

At the 2025 Tasmanian state election, Rockliff's Liberal party won 14 seats. 2025 Tasmanian government formation negotiations proved unsuccessful. Despite ongoing negotiations at the time, Governor Baker recommissioned Rockliff's government pending parliamentary confidence which was to be tested when the parliament returns. The Third Rockliff ministry was sworn in on 7 August 2025. Upon the return of parliament, a multi-hour debate ensued as to the house's confidence in Rockliff as premier. At the division vote on the matter, Rockliff was supported by every member of parliament except for those within the Labor party, finishing with a vote of 24-10.

== Electoral history ==
=== 2022 Tasmanian Liberal Party leadership election ===
Jeremy Rockliff, who had been the Deputy Premier since 2014, was elected unopposed as leader of the Tasmanian Liberal Party on 8 April 2022 following the resignation of former leader Peter Gutwein. Owing to the Liberal Party already being in government in Tasmania, Rockliff also became premier on 8 April.

=== 2024 Tasmanian state election ===
The 2024 Tasmanian state election was held on 23 March 2024. The election took place a year ahead of schedule due to 2 Liberal MPs (Lara Alexander and John Tucker) resigning from the Liberal Party over the proposed Macquarie Point Stadium, which plunged the party into minority government. Polls leading up to the election predicted that a hung parliament was likely; with then-Labor leader Rebecca White ruling out forming a coalition government with the Tasmanian Greens. Following the election, the Liberal Party won 14 out of 35 seats, with Labor conceding defeat. The 2024 Tasmanian government formation led to the Liberal Party gaining confidence and supply from all 3 elected members of the Jacqui Lambie Network and Independents David O'Byrne and Kristie Johnston.

==== 2030 Strong Plan for Tasmania's Future ====
A major part of the Liberal campaign in the 2024 state election was the 2030 Strong Plan for Tasmania's Future, which included policies such as:

- $250 energy credit per Tasmanian household prior to 30 June 2024;
- Using more Tasmanian hydropower in the state rather than exporting to Victoria;
- Half price bus and ferry fares;
- Stamp duty exemption for first home buyers with a home valued under $750,000;
- Banning ambulance ramping;
- Legislation so that if MPs switch parties during their term, their seat becomes vacant.

=== 2025 Tasmanian state election ===
At the 2025 state election, the Liberals have currently won 14 seats, and are in the race for a 15th. Labor won 10 seats. On the night of the election, Rockliff did not concede and instead announced his intention to ask the governor to recommission his government. Dean Winter, the opposition leader, announced that he would seek to form a government with the crossbench in the event that Rockliff's endeavour failed. This is seen as a walk-back of his pre-election comments that he wouldn't form a government with the Greens. Greens leader Rosalie Woodruff expressed interest and a willingness to form a government with Labor.

==== Government formation ====
On 6 August, in accordance with Westminster conventions, Governor Baker recommissioned Rockliff as premier, releasing an explanatory document in which she outlined that parliament would conduct confidence and no-confidence votes to decide on the government. Parliament will reconvene on 19 August, with opposition leader Dean Winter stating that either he, or the crossbench will move on the first sitting day a motion of no-confidence in the Liberal government, followed by a motion of confidence in Labor. If Winter's Labor succeeds in these motions, a Labor government will be installed.

Rockliff's third ministry was sworn in on 11 August.

On 7 August, only one crossbencher had offered support to either party — with Craig Garland expressing his intention to support Labor on both motions. Closer to the date of parliament's return, David O'Byrne again offered his support to the Liberal party. At a similar time, the Greens announced that they could not support the Labor party due to its unwillingness to negotiate with the crossbench. At the final vote of the no-confidence motion, the Liberals were supported by all independents, the Shooters, Fishers and Farmers party, and the Greens, delivering a result of 24–10 in Rockliff's favour. Following the no-confidence motion loss for Labor, the Labor constitution triggered the 2025 Tasmanian Labor Party leadership election, with Winter being defeated as leader by Josh Willie.

=== Polling ===
In August 2025, Rockliff reached a new high in preferred premier polling, reaching 50%, more than twice of that claimed by Labor leader Josh Willie.

== State affairs ==
=== Animal welfare ===
In August 2025, Rockliff announced a plan to end the funding of greyhound racing by 2029, with a subsequent ban on the racing.

=== Economy ===
During the premiership of Jeremy Rockliff, the economy of Tasmania has had strong economic growth by means of wage growth and investment. However, the proposed Macquarie Point Stadium has drawn criticism to the government due to the lack of private funding, which could increase the state's debt burden. According to a Roy Morgan business report released in 2025, businesses have declining confidence in Tasmania.

=== Education ===
On 16 September 2025, it was announced by the Department for Education, Children and Young People that 12 public schools would close the next day, 17 September, due to widespread strikes by educational support staff. Schools affected include Sorell School, Rose Bay High School and Oatlands District School, some of the largest schools in Tasmania.

Later in October 2025, it was announced that all public schools in the state would close over 3 separate days depending on the region. This was due to the Rockliff government denying Tasmanian Unions request of a 22.3% pay rise for teachers, claiming it was unaffordable.

=== Healthcare ===
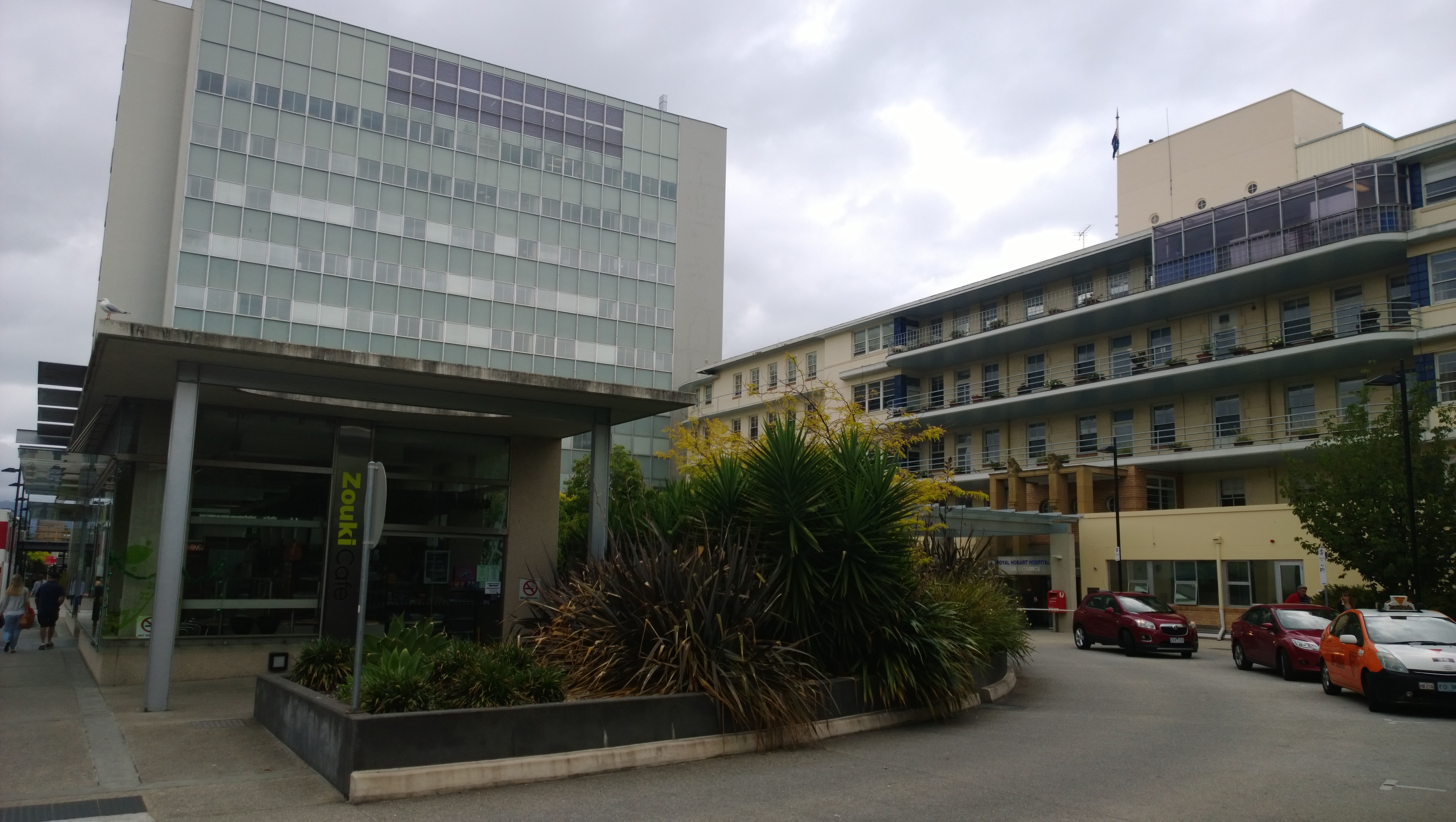
The Royal Hobart Hospital

The Parliament of Tasmania has conducted an inquiry into ambulance ramping. The inquiry has discovered that the Royal Hobart Hospital was negligent, with the inquiry hearing about overmedicating with opioids such as clinical fentanyl as well as reports about mental health patients that were ramped for long enough as to allow a mental health order (MHO) to expire.

The Government announced in 2024 that a new $90-million mental health facility would be built at the Launceston General Hospital, accommodating 30 patients with a short-stay unit and safe haven to reduce pressure on the hospital emergency department.

In 2022, the Tasmanian Government spent approximately $5.9 billion on healthcare, which is around 57% of the state's expenditure.

=== Housing ===
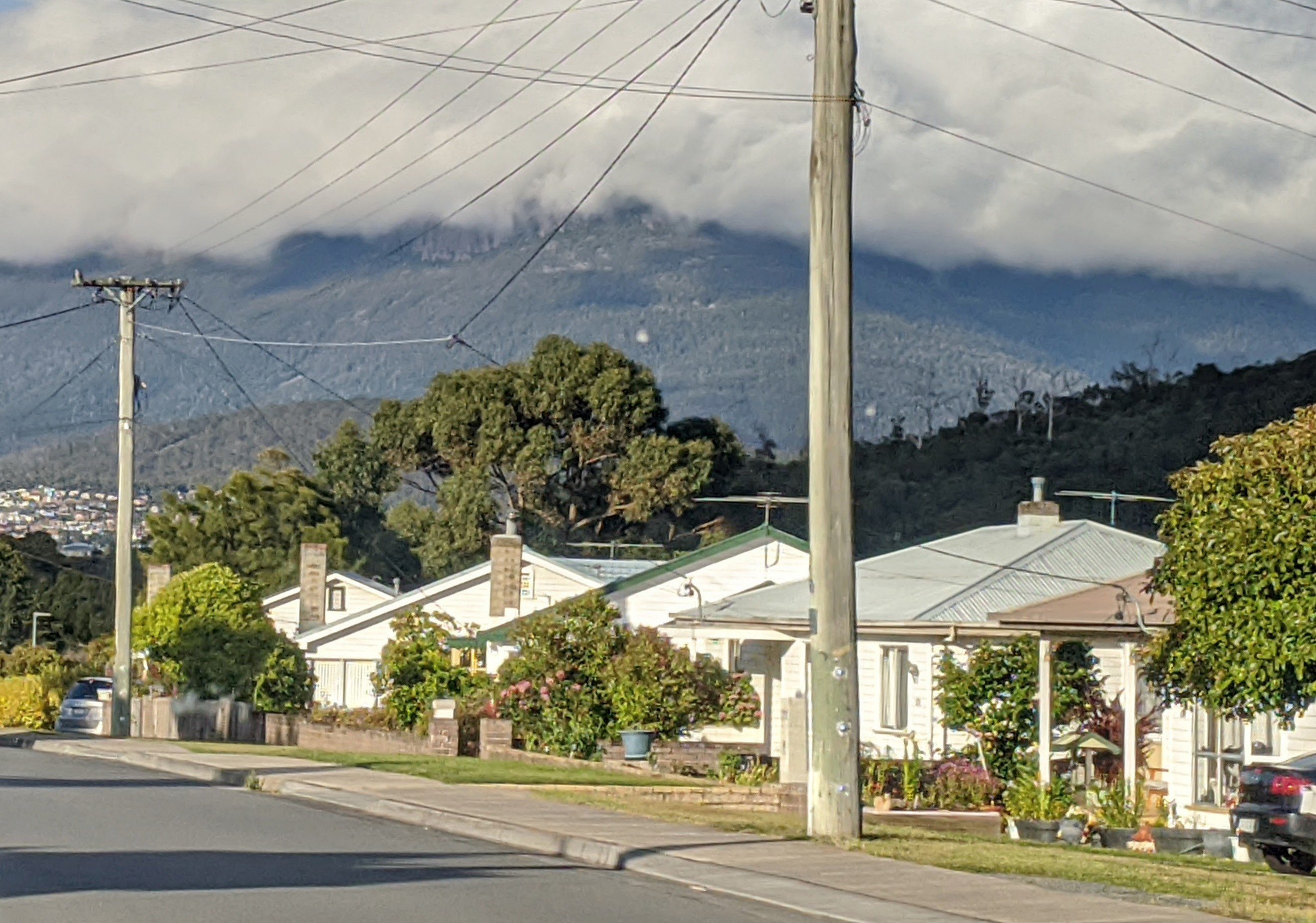
Houses in the low socio-economic area of Warrane.

Tasmania has had a housing crisis since 2017/18, caused by an economic boom. In 2018, Tasmanian capital-city Hobart has the lowest rental vacancy rate of any Australian capital city at 0.3%. In 2024, the waiting list for social housing averaged 80 weeks, increasing four-fold from 2019.

During Rockliff's premiership, the government has promised to deliver 10,000 social or affordable homes by 2032, with the majority being affordable homes. As of 2025, the government has abolished stamp-duty for first home buyers with a house valued under $750,000.

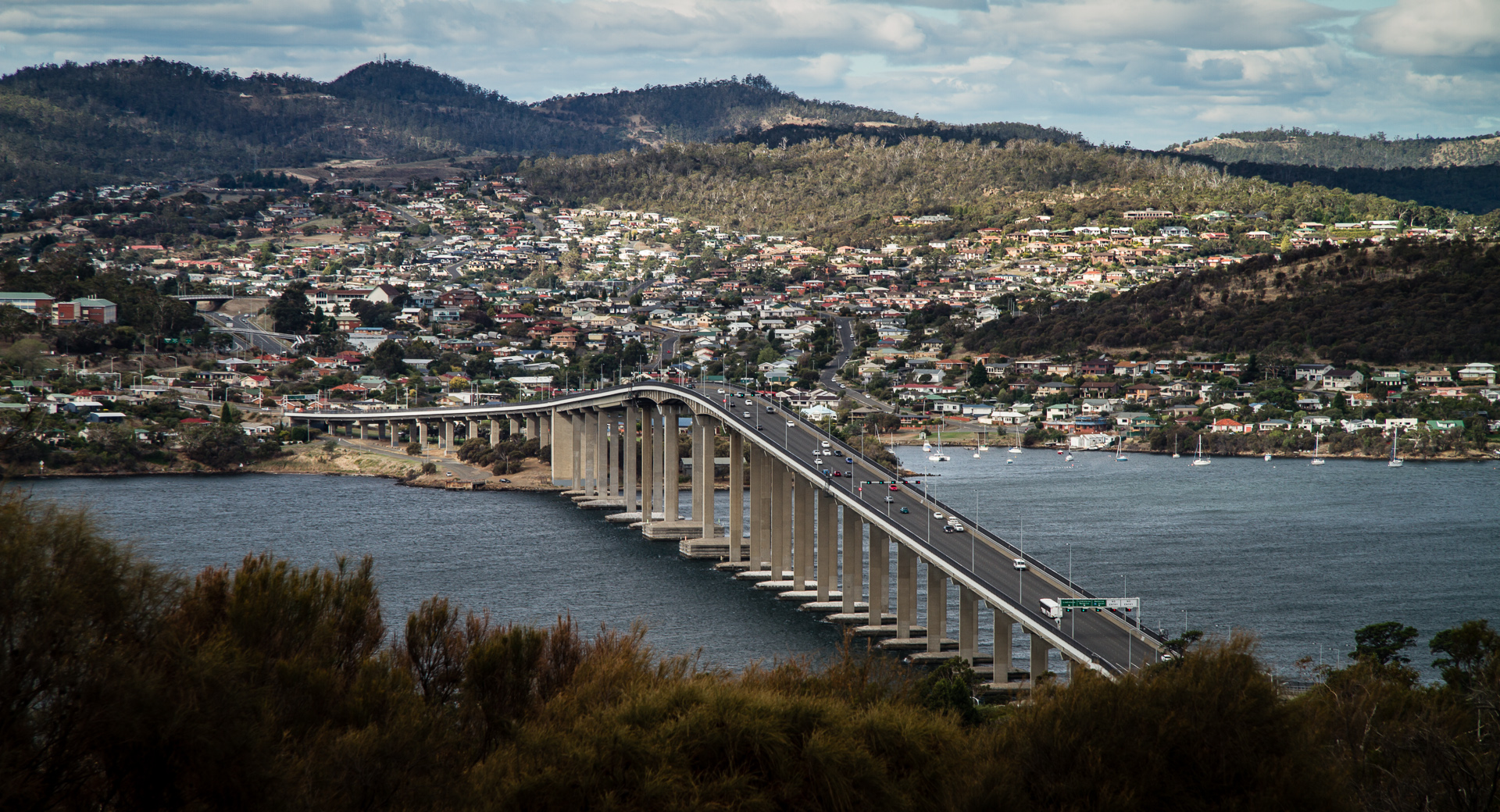
The Tasman Bridge, nearby to the site of the proposed stadium.

=== Macquarie Point Stadium ===
The Macquarie Point Stadium is a proposed multi-purpose stadium for Hobart. Since announced in 2022, the stadium has drawn wide criticism from Tasmanian residents and political parties due to the cost of the project and distraction from the surrounding scenery. The stadium was mainly proposed in order to allow Tasmania to have an Australian Football League team, with an AFL executive saying that there would not be a Tasmanian team without the stadium being constructed. The estimated cost of the stadium is slated to exceed the projected $775m and surge to around $1.1b with the estimated cost for Tasmania being $785m. The Rockliff government pledged to not spend more than $375m on the project, with the rest covered by federal funds, however an independent analysis deems this unlikely.

During Rebecca White's leadership of the Tasmanian Labor Party, Labor did not support the stadium and instead pledged to build an elective surgery hospital in Hobart as a 2024 state election commitment. Under Dean Winter's leadership, Labor has agreed to support the stadium due to the large amount of local jobs that will open for its construction. The Tasmanian Greens and Jacqui Lambie Network are vehemently opposed the stadium.

In 2025, it was announced by the government that the stadium would be pulled out of the Project of State Significance process and instead be enabled by special legislation in the parliament with the support of Labor. Rockliff was criticised for giving members of the Tasmanian Legislative Council an ultimatum regarding the stadium legislation.

On 13 November 2025, the House of Assembly voted to approve the parliamentary order allowing the Macquarie Point Stadium to go ahead as planned. This division resulted in 25 votes in favour, with 9 against. The order was supported by all members of the Liberals, Labor and Shooters, Fishers and Farmers, as well as independent David O'Byrne. Voting against were all 5 members of the Tasmanian Greens, as well as remaining independents George, Johnston, Garland and Razay.

=== Spirit of Tasmania ===
Two new Spirit of Tasmania ships (Spirit of Tasmania IV and Spirit of Tasmania V) have been constructed in Finland for a cost totalling $900m. Despite the ships being built, they weren't able to be used in Tasmania because the berth has not yet been built, and is running over-budget. The government has been criticised due to the required berth not being finished until 2027 as well as the project being on course to go $130 million over budget. In 2025 it was rumoured that the Scottish government, with Spirit IV then based in Edinburgh, intended to use the ship to house refugees of the Russian invasion of Ukraine, however these rumours were shut down by the Tasmanian government and the ship is being sent to Australia.

=== Privatisation of state-owned assets ===
In September 2024, then-treasurer Michael Ferguson stated that he was open to selling off one or multiple of Tasmania's state-owned corporations in order to improve the state's budget position, which was not expected to get back into surplus until the end of the 2020s, at the earliest. This was criticised by shadow treasurer Josh Willie, who stated that Labor would staunchly oppose any attempts to privatise the state's publicly held assets. The proposal was also condemned by Tasmanian Greens leader Rosalie Woodruff, who reiterated her party's opposition to budgetary allocations for the Macquarie Point stadium project.

In early November, Rockliff proposed merging TasPorts, TT-Line and TasRail into a single entity, in order to create a unified passenger and freight business. He stated that the move was intended to address "shortcomings" in state-owned companies, and aimed to "streamline operations, reduce inefficiencies and deliver better outcomes for Tasmanian businesses and residents". The merger was to be coupled with changes in internal managerial arrangements. These included a mandate that 50% of board members of any state-owned enterprise be Tasmanian, that no minister be able to hold more than one shareholding position at a time, and that directorships and board appointments be term-limited.

On 10 November, Guy Barnett announced that the government planned to sell the heritage-listed Treasury Building, and was seeking expressions of interest from developers. The proposal was denounced by both Labor and the Greens, who compared it to a "fire sale" of publicly owned assets. Josh Willie claimed that the sale would amount to a "short-term sugar hit", while Greens spokesperson Vica Bayley accused the Liberals of looking to "flog off the family jewels".

In March 2025, it was reported that Rockliff was considering the privatisation of state-owned assets, including Metro Tasmania, the Motor Accident Insurance Board (MAIB) and the Land Titles Office. However, he ruled out selling Hydro Tasmania, which is the state's largest electricity generator. Rockliff stated that the government would conduct an assessment of the benefits of privatisation, led by economist Saul Eslake. He also proposed a 99-year lease of transmission provider TasNetworks, and pledged that revenues from public asset sales would contribute to a Sensible Pathway to Surplus Future Fund. The announcement was condemned by shadow treasurer Josh Willie, who asserted that the privatisation of utilities would lead to increased costs and inferior public services. Community and Public Sector Union (CPSU) secretary Thirza White accused the government of seeking temporary fiscal relief, while Rosalie Woodruff claimed that Rockliff was beholden to, in her view, far-right interests within his party. However, northern independent MPs Rebekah Pentland and Miriam Beswick said they welcomed a debate around asset sales, but that any sale had to be "strategic".

On 7 June 2025, two days after losing a no-confidence motion in the Tasmanian House of Assembly, Jeremy Rockliff announced that he would no longer be pursuing the privatisation of state-owned assets.

=== Youth crime ===
A poll conducted in 2024 found that youth crime is the primary concern for Tasmanians. Following youth gang attacks in Hobart suburbs in 2025, the Rockliff government has committed to introducing Adult Crime, Adult Time legislation to punish youth offenders. The proposed legislation has been criticised by criminologists, alleging that the laws will create 'career criminals'. In Tasmania, half of all youth crime is perpetrated by just 57 offenders.

The state of Tasmania has settled a class action lawsuit by former prisoners of Ashley Youth Detention Centre imprisoned between 1960 and 2023, with plaintiffs alleging that they witnessed, suffered or were threatened with sexual abuse. A commission of inquiry into child sexual abuse in institutional settings was established in 2021 to advise the government on how to:

- Protect children against sexual abuse in institutional settings;
- Have better practice in acting on reports of child sexual abuse in institutional settings;
- Ensure justice for victims through improved processes for investigation and prosecution.

Ashley Youth Detention Centre is currently scheduled to close in mid-2026.

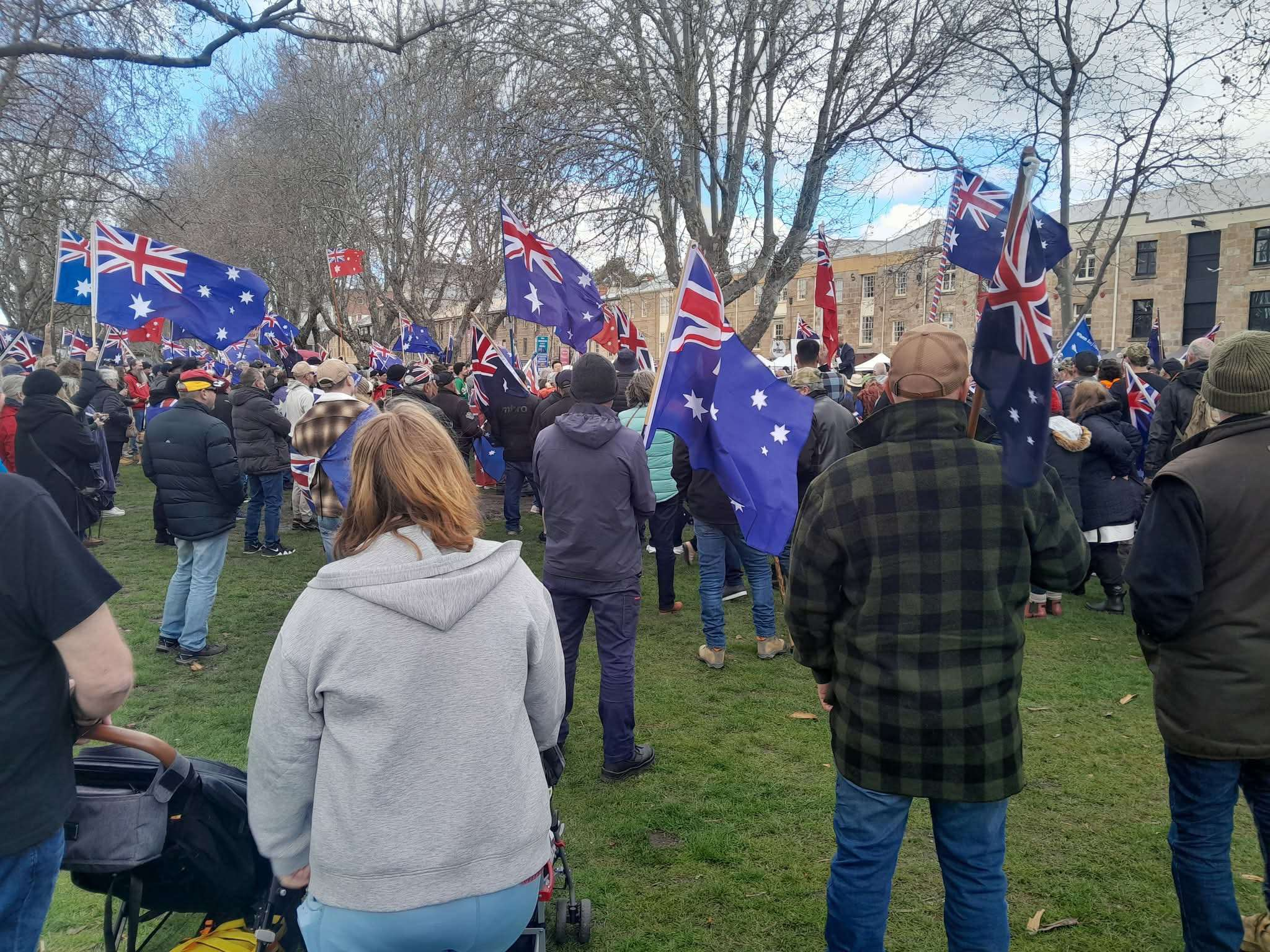
March for Australia protestors in Hobart

=== March for Australia ===
On 31 August 2025, March for Australia anti-immigration rallies took place across Australia, including in the Tasmanian capital of Hobart. The Hobart protest garnered around 300 demonstrators, vastly outnumbering the close by counter protestors. The March for Australia protestors had an encounter with Antifa demonstrators from the opposing rally, which caused riot police to set a demarcation line between the two sides preventing them from continuing the mutual instigation. Unlike other state and territory leaders, initially Jeremy Rockliff did not comment on the March for Australia at all, including whether he supported the protest or was against it. However, on 10 September he joined other state and territory leaders in condemning it.

=== Local governance ===
On 15 September 2025, the government announced the proposed changes to local government in Tasmania, to be put in a bill before parliament. The proposed changes would cut the amount of councillors per council, and boost pay for councillors. The changes are projected to be in effect in time for the 2026 Tasmanian local elections. The changes to each council, if the bill passes, are below.

On 16 September, mayor of Break O'Day Council announced his support for the measures, which would see his council lose 2 positions. He stated that the majority of the council supports reduction in councillors.

Council	Previous councillors	Proposed councillors	Change
City of Clarence	12	9	▼3
City of Hobart	12	9	▼3
City of Launceston	12	9	▼3
City of Glenorchy	10	9	▼1
Kingborough	10	9	▼1
City of Burnie	9	7	▼2
Central Coast	9	7	▼2
City of Devonport	9	7	▼2
West Tamar	9	7	▼2
Northern Midlands	9	7	▼2
Sorell	9	7	▼2
Circular Head	9	7	▼2
Meander Valley	9	7	▼2
Huon Valley	9	7	▼2
Brighton	9	7	▼2
Waratah Wynyard	8	7	▼1
Break O'Day	9	7	▼2
Derwent Valley	8	7	▼1
Latrobe	9	7	▼2
Dorset	9	7	▼2
Kentish	9	7	▼2
Spring Bay	8	7	▼1
George Town	9	7	▼2
Southern Midlands	7	7	-
Central Highlands	9	5	▼4
West Coast	9	5	▼4
Flinders	7	5	▼2
King Island	9	5	▼4
Tasman	7	5	▼2

=== Parliamentary salaries ===
In October 2025, the Tasmanian Industrial Tribunal released their report on parliamentary salaries. The TII is responsible for setting salaries, and had not issued new salary rises since 2019. They used a formula compounding a ~3% increase year over year from 2019 to 2025, resulting in a parliamentary base salary increase of $140,185 to $171,527. Parliament was tasked with approving the wage increase, to which the Liberal government strongly condemned the increase and voted against it with the Greens and a number of crossbenchers. Labor and some crossbenchers did however support the increase.

To the dismay of Premier Rockliff and the Liberal government, the salary increases went into effect, with a number of parliamentarians openly stating whether they would accept or decline the pay increase. Labor members accepted the increase, with Rockliff and 5 other Liberal members declining, stating they would prefer a standard 3% increase without it compounded since 2019. Tasmanian politicians, as well as the Premier, are some of the lowest paid politicians in Australia.

The total payment for a member of parliament without any special responsibilities is below.

Allowance	Amount	Varied
Basic Parliamentary Salary	$171,527	No, equal for all Tasmanian members of parliament.
Motor Vehicle Allowance	$20,124	Yes; members can opt to receive a vehicle instead of the allowance.
Electorate Allowance	Bass: $57,894 Braddon: $63,157 Clark: $42,104 Franklin: $50,876 Lyons: $70,177	Yes; depending on electorate. Legislative Council salaries are not included here.
Telecommunications Allowances	90% of Telecommunications charges	No
Members' Resources Allowances	$7,500	No
Total annual payment	More than $241,255	Yes, depends on telecommunications usage and electorate represented.

== Federal & international affairs ==
=== Federal affairs ===
Rockliff supported the Yes vote in the 2023 Australian Indigenous Voice referendum. Tasmania voted against the Voice with 58.94% of the vote.

Rockliff joined Federal Labor and other state premiers to support the enactment of the Online Safety Amendment (Social Media Minimum Age) Act 2024, although he argued for a minimum age of 14 instead of 16.

=== International affairs ===
==== Assassination of Charlie Kirk ====
On 11 September 2025, senior government minister Eric Abetz responded to the assassination of Charlie Kirk, stating "Charlie was murdered – a political assassination, according to American authorities – by an as yet uncalled shooter while doing what he did best, courageously standing up for faith, family and country.”

Deputy premier Guy Barnett referred to Kirk as a "mentor and visionary".

== Appointments ==
=== Cabinet ===
Party	Minister	Portfolio	Electorate
Executive government
	Jeremy Rockliff	Premier	Braddon HA
	Guy Barnett	Deputy Premier; Attorney-General; Minister for Justice, Corrections and Rehabilitation; Minister for Small Business, Trade and Consumer Affairs; Minister for Environment	Lyons HA
	Eric Abetz	Treasurer; Leader of the House; Minister for Macquarie Point Urban Renewal	Franklin HA
	Bridget Archer	Minister for Health, Mental Health and Wellbeing; Minister for Aboriginal Affairs; Minister for Ageing	Bass HA
	Gavin Pearce	Minister for Primary Industries and Water; Minister for Veterans' Affairs	Braddon HA
	Felix Ellis	Minister for Police, Fire and Emergency Management; Minister for Business, Industry and Resources; Minister for Skills and Jobs; Minister for Innovation, Science and Digital Economy	Braddon HA
	Roger Jaensch	Minister for the Arts; Minister for Community and Multicultural Affairs; Minister for Racing; Minister for Tourism, Hospitality and Events	Braddon HA
	Kerry Vincent	Minister for Infrastructure; Minister for Local Government; Minister for Housing and Planning	Prosser LC
	Jo Palmer	Minister for Education; Minister for Children and Youth; Minister for Disability Services; Minister for Women and the Prevention of Family Violence	Rosevears LC
	Nick Duigan	Minister for Energy and Renewables; Minister for Parks; Minister for Sport	WindermereLC
	Rob Fairs	Assistant Minister for Youth Engagement and Sport	Bass HA
Parliamentary offices
	Tania Rattray	Leader of the Government in the Tasmanian Legislative Council	McIntyre LC
Previous members
	Madeleine Ogilvie (2025-26)	Minister for Innovation, Science and Digital Economy; Minister for Environment; Minister for Arts and Heritage; Minister for Community and Multicultural Affairs	Clark HA
	Jane Howlett (2025-26)	Minister for Racing; Minister for Tourism, Hospitality and Events; Minister for Women and the Prevention of Family Violence	Lyons HA

=== Governor ===
Governor Barbara Baker's term will end by convention in 2026, with Rockliff likely to nominate her successor as is the norm.

=== Supreme Court ===
Rockliff appointed Chris Shanahan to succeed Alan Blow as Chief Justice of Tasmania in 2025.

Office	Body	Appointee	Order of precedence	Home state	Assumed office	Nominators
Chief Justice Lieutenant-Governor	Supreme Court Government	Chris Shanahan	7th	Western Australia	20 January, 2025	Jeremy Rockliff Guy Barnett

== Legislative agenda ==
Major legislation introduced, or speculated to be introduced during Rockliff's premiership include:

- Macquarie Point Stadium legislation
- Liquor licensing reform legislation
- Adult Crime, Adult Time legislation
- Asbestos-Related Diseases Compensation Amendment Bill 2023
- Housing Land Supply Amendment Bill 2023
- 4-year fixed parliamentary terms
  - Tasmania already has 4-year parliamentary terms, though they are unfixed. A fixed system would mean that the Governor cannot grant early elections unless in emergent circumstances, like a loss of confidence.

== Parliamentary affairs & confidence ==
=== Political instability ===
In May 2023, two Liberal MPs (Lara Alexander and John Tucker) resigned from the Liberal party to sit on the crossbench due to their opposition to the stadium project. This put the Liberal party into minority government and Rockliff called an election for 23 March 2024. Following the election, the Liberal party were 4 seats short of a majority, however Rockliff managed to gain confidence and supply from the three Jacqui Lambie Network MPs as well as two independents. After the Lambie Network collapsed, its final MP pulled out of the confidence and supply agreement in September 2024 leaving the government with a thin majority of just one seat.

In March 2025, the government survived a motion of no confidence, with Kristie Johnston voting against the government in violation of the confidence and supply agreement due to the government abandoning its integrity commission.

In a later motion of no confidence put forth in May 2025, the government remained with the Labor party supporting the government for a second no confidence motion.

=== Demise of second term ===
June 2025 no-confidence vote in Jeremy Rockliff
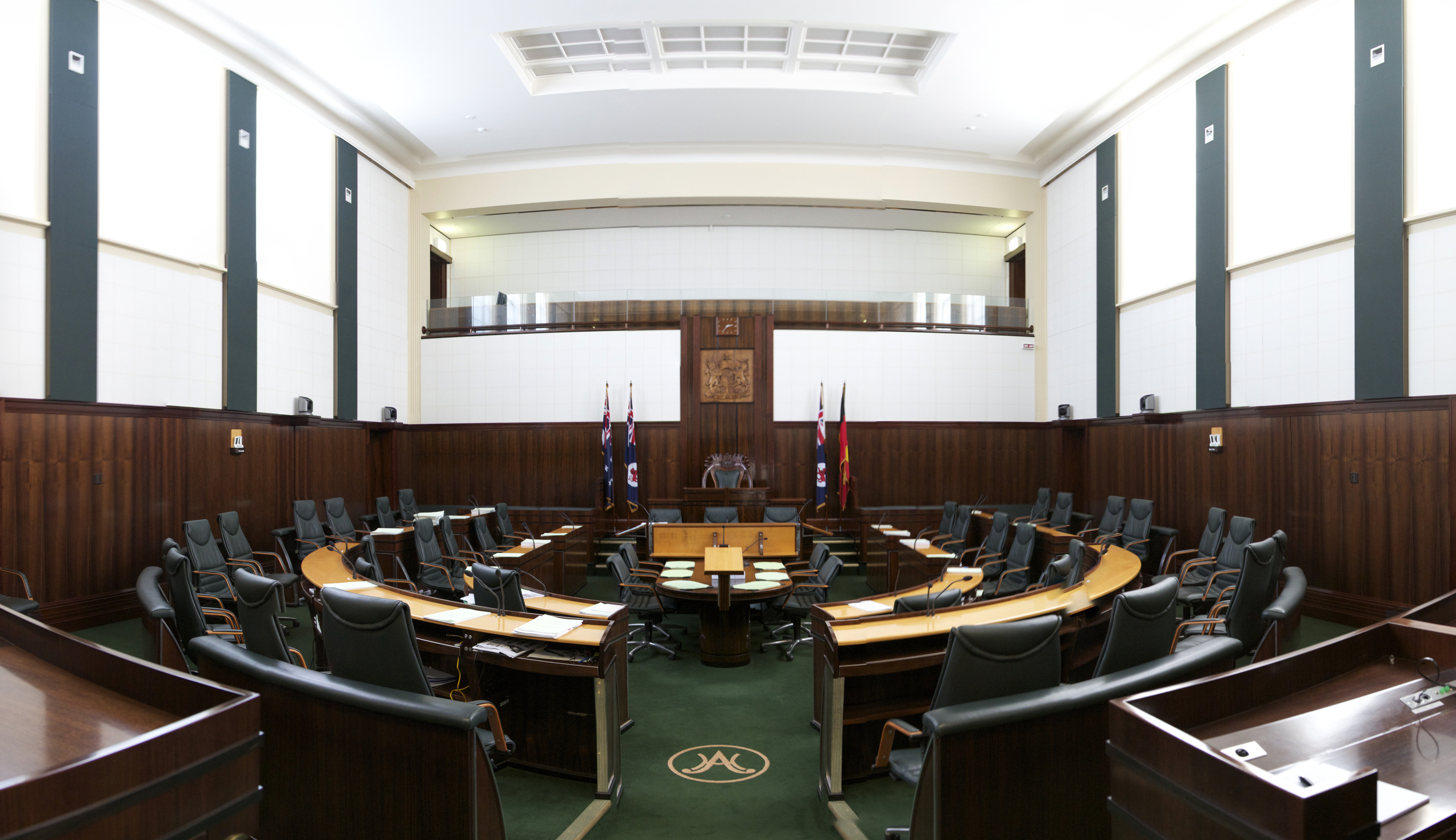
- House of Assembly chamber
- Date: June 4–5, 2025
- Duration: 16 hours of debate
- Venue: Parliament House, Tasmania
- Type: Political crisis
- Cause: Spirit of Tasmania fiasco State budget issues Collapse of Rockliff confidence-and-supply
- Participants: Liberals · Labor · Greens · Lambie Network · Kristie Johnston · Craig Garland · Miriam Beswick · Rebekah Pentland · Barbara Baker
- Outcome: Jeremy Rockliff announces 2025 Tasmanian state election
- Vote result: 18 votes in favour, 17 votes against

On 3 June 2025, Labor Leader Dean Winter announced that his party intended to present a no-confidence motion in the parliament on the following day, if he garnered enough support from the crossbench. Independents Kristie Johnston and Craig Garland, as well as Lambie Network member Andrew Jenner announced the same day that they would support the motion. Former Labor leader-turned-independent David O'Byrne criticised Labor for moving the motion and signalled he would not support it. On the morning of 4 June, the Tasmanian Greens announced they would support the motion, theoretically giving a majority in support of 18 members.

When parliament resumed on 4 June at 10:00am, debate ensued around the motion. Premier Rockliff stated that if the motion succeeded, he would go to the Lieutenant-Governor (Note: This is because the Governor, Barbara Baker, was not in the state at the time) to call an early election, just 14 months after the previous election. The debate lasted from 10:00am until the parliament customarily adjourned at 7:30pm, with 18 votes to 16 in favour of adjournment. 19 members had spoken in the debate by that point, with all members of parliament allotted 20–30 minutes to speak. Debate continued the next day.

On 5 June 2025, at 3:42 pm, the parliament passed the no-confidence motion, ending nearly 16 hours of debate. Premier Rockliff announced he would visit lieutenant-governor Chris Shanahan seeking a snap election, which would be the fourth state election in just 7 years. The result of the vote was 18–17 in favour, with speaker Michelle O'Byrne casting the tie-breaking vote.

=== Third term formation ===
August 2025 no-confidence vote in Jeremy Rockliff
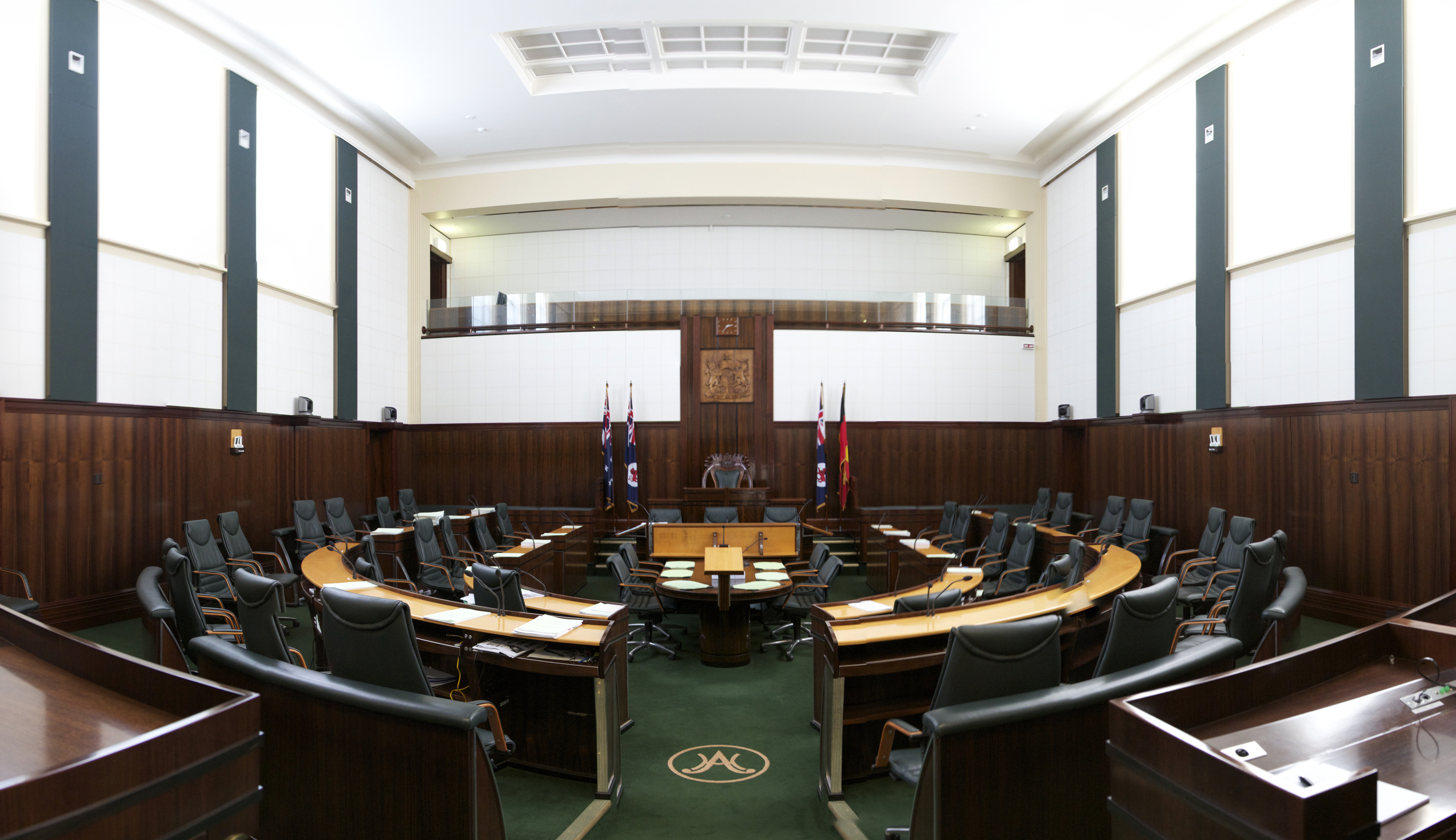
- House of Assembly chamber
- Date: 19 August 2025
- Duration: ~4 hours of debate
- Venue: Parliament House, Tasmania
- Type: Government formation
- Cause: Labor's attempt to gain government
- Participants: Liberals · Labor · Greens · SFF · Kristie Johnston · Craig Garland · Peter George · David O'Byrne · George Razay · Barbara Baker
- Outcome: Jeremy Rockliff retains government
- Vote result: 10 votes in favour, 24 votes against

In the weeks following the 2025 Tasmanian state election, Rockliff gained enough support for crossbenchers on the August no-confidence motion to retain government.

His current support bloc in the parliament is below.

Party	Member/s	Confidence arrangement	Supporting since
House of Assembly
Liberal	14	Governing party	N/A
Greens	5	Informal - parliamentary vote	18 August 2025
Independent	David O'Byrne	Formal letter-of-intent	2024 election
Independent	Kristie Johnston	Informal - parliamentary vote	18 August 2025
Total: 21 votes in support of Rockliff (18 needed for majority)
Legislative Council
Liberal	3	Governing party	N/A
Independent	Tania Rattray	Formal - has joined Third Rockliff ministry	9 August 2025

== See also ==
- Allan government
- Premiership of David Crisafulli
- Chief ministership of Lia Finocchiaro
