= 2024 Tasmanian state election =

State election in Australia

- 23 March 2024

All 35 seats in the House of Assembly 18 seats needed for a majority
- Opinion polls
- Registered: 408,197
- Turnout: 372,077 (91.15% ▼0.07pp)
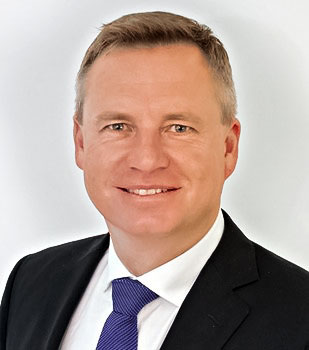

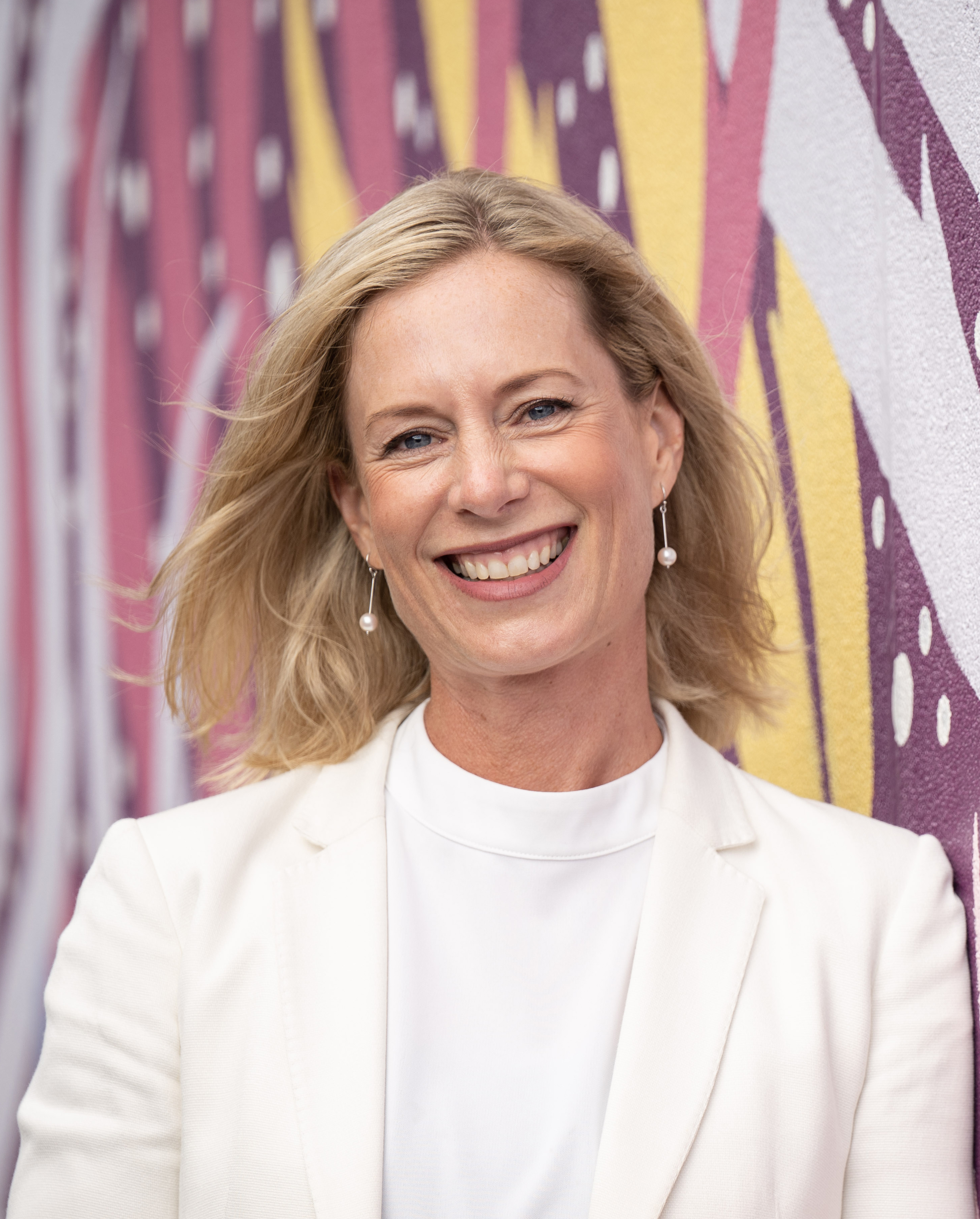

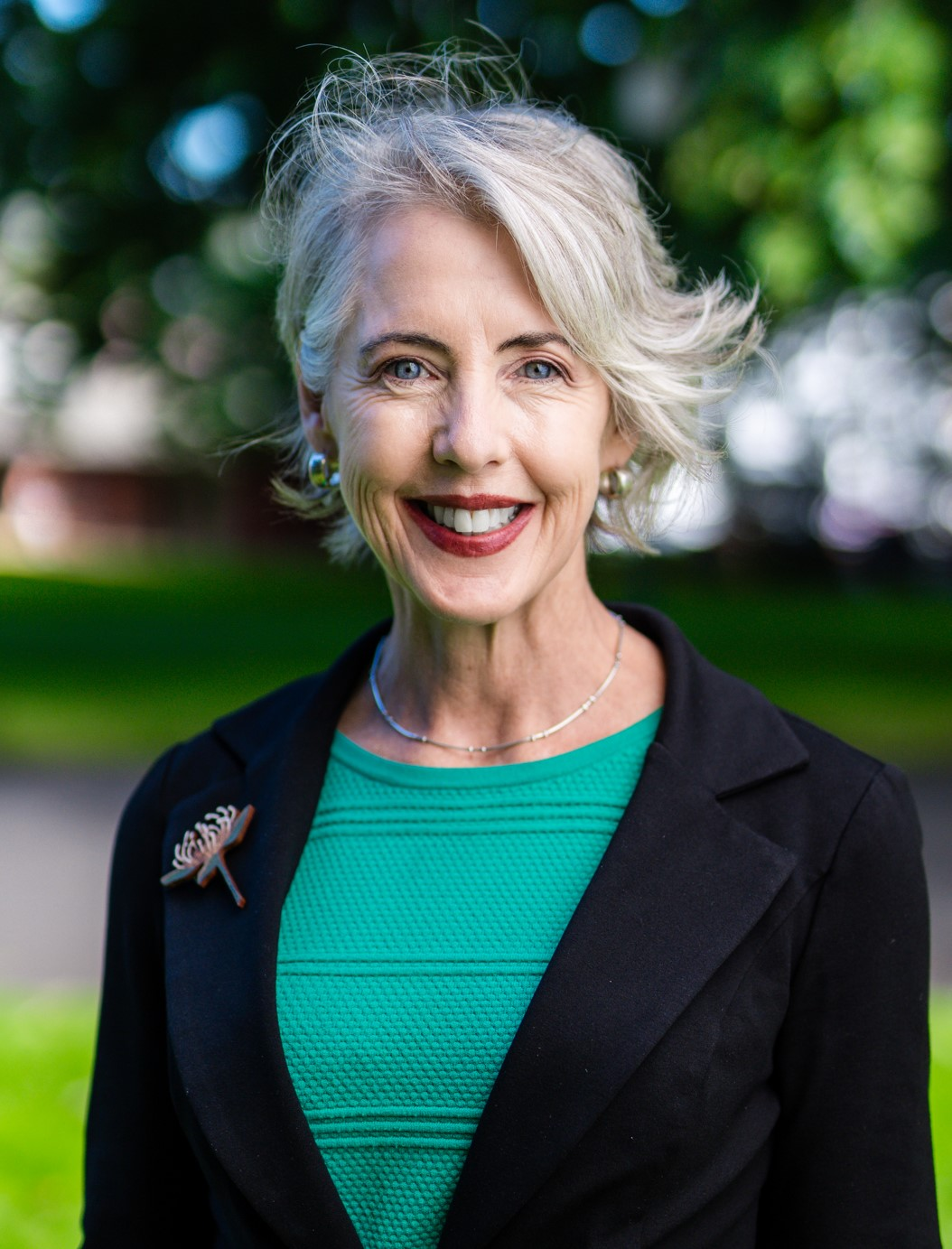

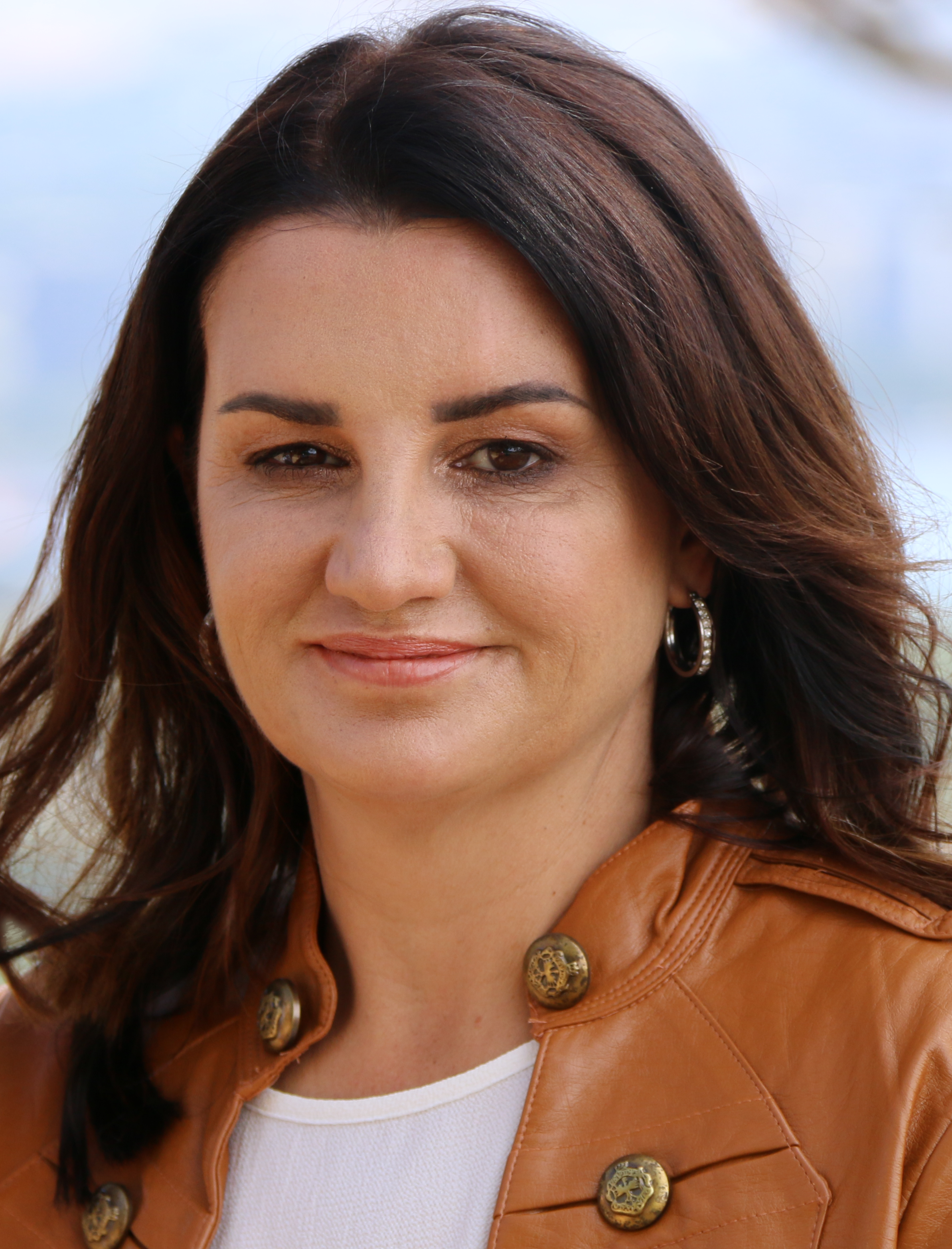
	First party	Second party
Leader	Jeremy Rockliff	Rebecca White
Party	Liberal	Labor
Leader since	8 April 2022	7 July 2021
Leader's seat	Braddon	Lyons
Last election	13 seats, 48.72%	9 seats, 28.20%
Seats before	11 (Note: In May 2023 Liberal MHAs Lara Alexander (Bass) and John Tucker (Lyons) resigned from the party and left the government to sit on the crossbench as independents. They agreed to provide the government with confidence and supply.)	8 (Note: Labor Party leader David O'Byrne resigned his position two months after the 2021 state election following misconduct allegations. A month after the allegations were made O'Byrne sat on the crossbench as an Independent Labor MHA.)
Seats won	14	10
Seat change	▲3	▲2
Popular vote	127,837	101,113
Percentage	36.67%	29.00%
Swing	▼12.05pp	▲0.80pp
	Third party	Fourth party
Leader	Rosalie Woodruff	Jacqui Lambie
Party	Greens	Lambie Network
Leader since	13 July 2023	14 May 2015
Leader's seat	Franklin	Did not contest (Note: Jacqui Lambie sits in the Australian Senate as a senator from Tasmania.)
Last election	2 seats, 12.38%	Did not contest
Seats before	2	0
Seats won	5	3
Seat change	▲3	▲3
Popular vote	48,430	23,260
Percentage	13.89%	6.67%
Swing	▲1.51pp	▲6.67pp
- Results of the election
Premier before election
Jeremy Rockliff
Liberal
Elected Premier
Jeremy Rockliff
Liberal

The 2024 Tasmanian state election was held on 23 March 2024 to elect all 35 members of the Tasmanian House of Assembly.

The House of Assembly uses the proportional Hare-Clark system of voting, with the 35 members elected from five seven-member constituencies. The Assembly's size was increased from 25 to 35 seats at this election, under the provisions of the Expansion of House of Assembly Act 2022, assented to in December 2022. The election was conducted by the Tasmanian Electoral Commission. Elections for the 15-seat single-member district upper house, known as the Legislative Council, which use full-preference instant-runoff voting, are staggered each year and conducted separately from lower house state elections.

The Liberal government, led by Premier Jeremy Rockliff, and the Labor opposition, led by Rebecca White, both attempted to win a majority government. The Greens and the Jacqui Lambie Network also contested the election, as well as several independents and other minor parties.

The election resulted in a hung parliament, with the Liberal Party remaining the largest party by both vote share and seat total; winning 14 seats. Labor and the Greens won 10 and five seats respectively, with both parties experiencing only a small increase in their respective vote percentages, despite a large swing against the Liberal Party. The majority of the swing went to independents and the Jacqui Lambie Network, who won three seats in its first state election. Both major parties fell short of a majority, with the Liberals and Labor requiring four and eight seats respectively from the crossbench to form government.

The day after the election, Labor conceded and its leader Rebecca White stated the party would not seek to negotiate with other MPs to form a government, triggering a leadership election. On 10 April, the Liberal Party and Jacqui Lambie Network announced an agreement had been reached for the latter to provide confidence and supply to the government. The second Rockliff ministry was sworn in the following day with Independent MP David O'Byrne providing written assurance of confidence and supply, giving the Liberal party the numbers required to form government.

Ultimately, both O'Byrne and fellow independent Kristie Johnston signed confidence and supply agreements with the government, giving it 19 of the 35 votes on the floor of the parliament. It was the first time that a non-Labor party in Tasmania had won a fourth consecutive term in government since adopting the Liberal banner in 1945.

Beginning with the 1992 election, the 2024 election marks the last consecutive election in which Tasmanian voters were presented with a different Premier from the previous election.

== Date ==
Under section 23 of the Constitution Act 1934, the House of Assembly was to expire four years from the return of the writs for its election, which took place on 1 May 2021. The Governor must issue writs of election between five and ten days thereafter. Nominations must close on a date seven to twenty-one days after the issuance of the writ, and polling day must be a Saturday between 22 and 30 days after nominations close.

In May 2023, Premier Jeremy Rockliff ruled out holding an early election, in contrast to his predecessor (Peter Gutwein), who called the last state election a year early. However on 14 February 2024, Rockliff visited with Governor Barbara Baker to request that an election be called a year early after the Liberal government was forced into a minority, a request which was accepted. It was the second consecutive occasion the Premier of Tasmania called a snap election after Gutwein called the previous state election a year early for a similar reason.

=== Key dates ===
Important dates in relation to the election are:

- Wednesday 21 February: Issue of the writs, close of rolls and opening of candidate nominations
- Thursday 29 February: Candidate nominations close
- Friday 1 March: Announcement of nominations in ballot paper order
- Monday 4 March: Early voting opens
- Friday 15 March: Postal voting applications close
- Wednesday 20 March: The People's Forum (Rockliff v White) broadcast on Sky News Australia
- Saturday 23 March: Polling day
- Tuesday 2 April: Final postal votes are received and preferences begin to be distributed

The TEC estimates the following dates for counting progress:

- Saturday 6 April: Counting ends
- Wednesday 10 April: Final results declared

== Background ==
=== Previous election ===
After the snap 2021 election, the Liberal Party successfully won a majority of seats in the Tasmanian House of Assembly. A Liberal MP for Braddon, Adam Brooks, resigned on 14 May 2021 after being charged with firearms offences by Queensland law enforcement. These offences were unauthorised possession of a Category H weapon, unauthorised possession of explosives, and dealing with identity documents. Premier Peter Gutwein said that "I made the decision that under the circumstances of both his mental health and in terms of the fact that he's now facing these new charges, that he won't take his seat in parliament." Greens leader Cassy O'Connor said that "there are now very serious questions to answer about whether or not he was ever considered a legitimate candidate by the Liberal Party", given he resigned "the day the polls [were] declared". Prior claims from women were made before the 2021 election, saying they were catfished by Brooks under the alias "Terry Brooks". Despite the resignation, the Liberal Party's numbers in the House of Assembly were unchanged, due to the replacing member being a member of the party.

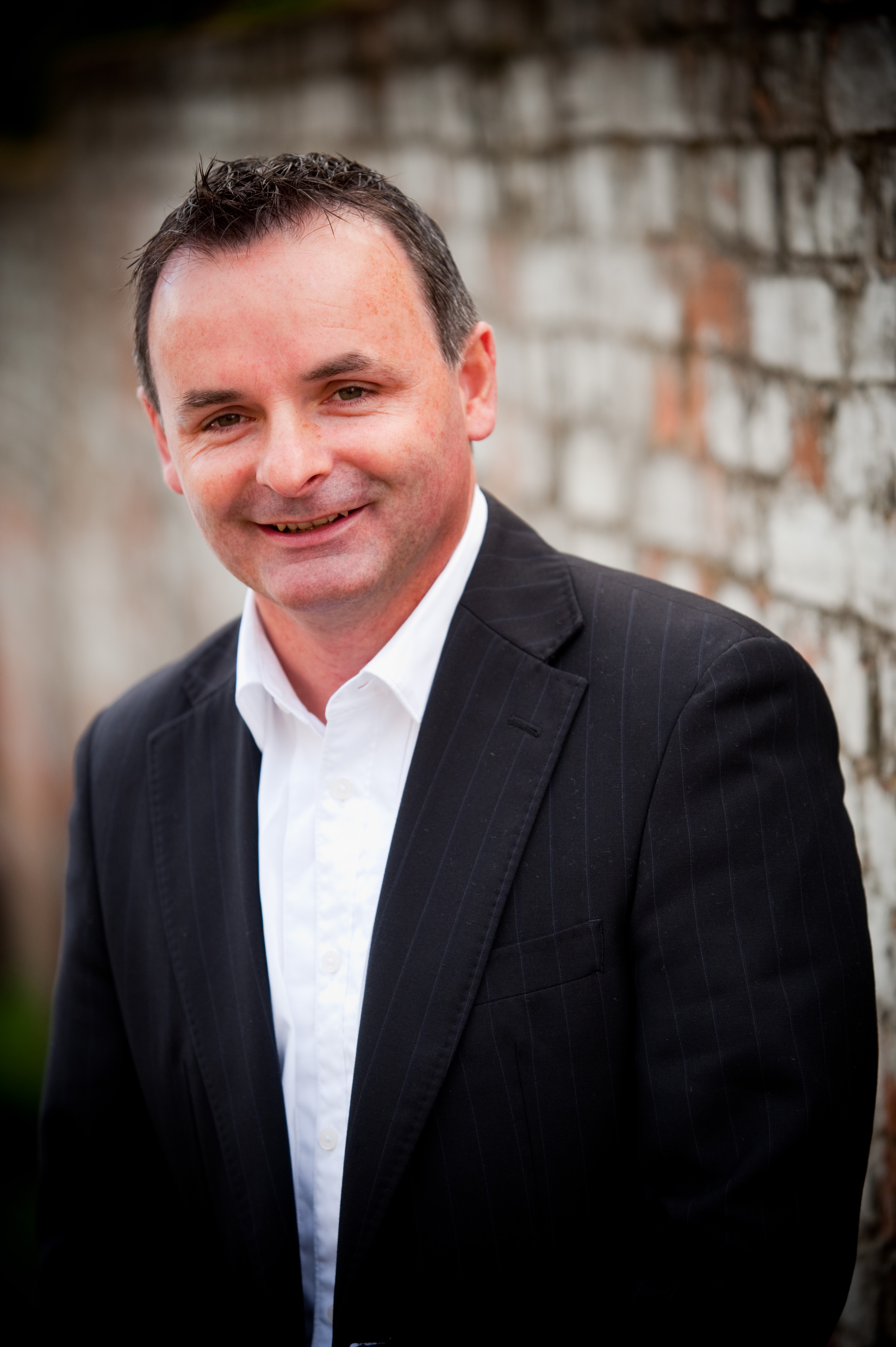
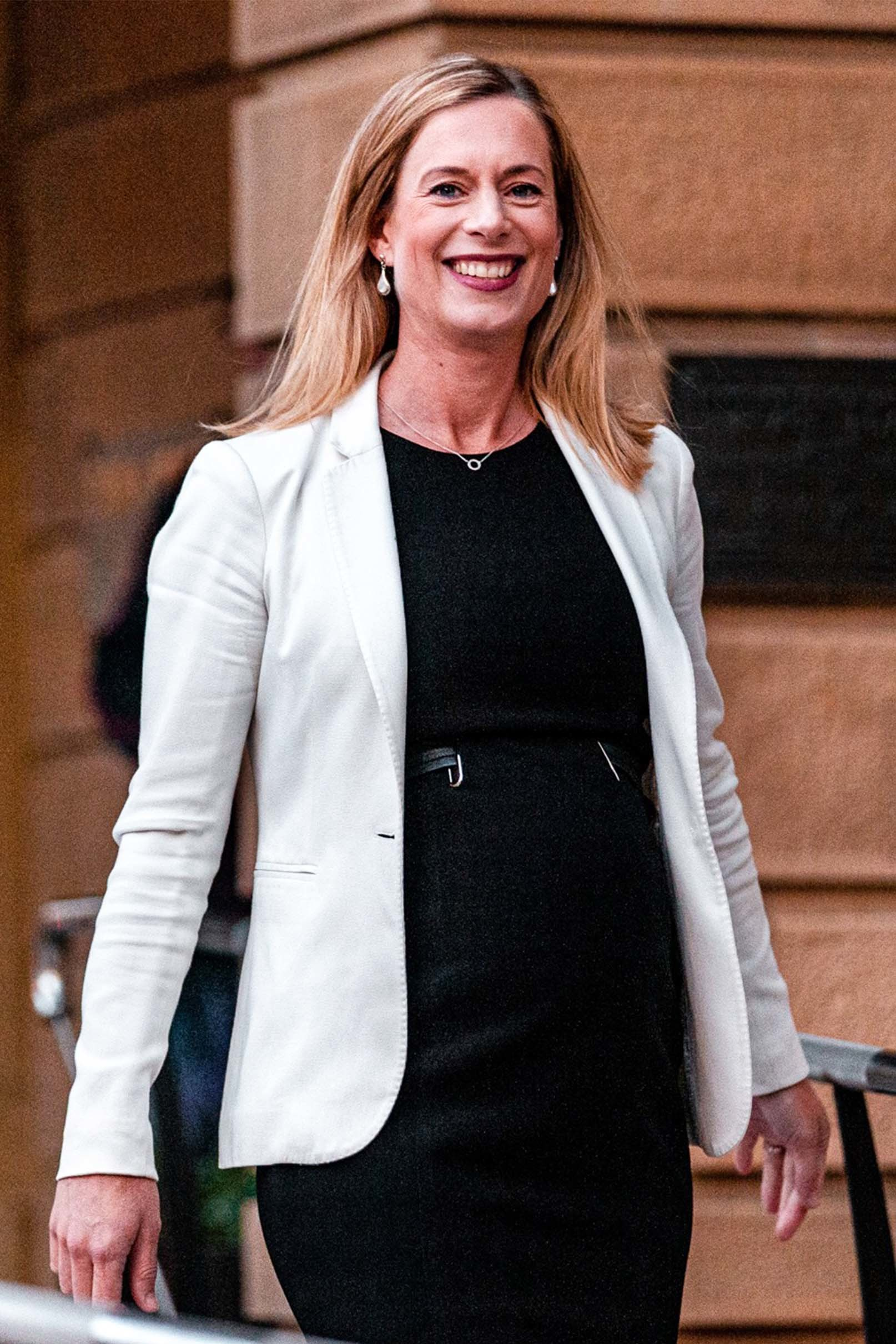
David O'Byrne (left) served as Labor leader for 22 days, resigning over sexual harassment allegations. His predecessor as leader, Rebecca White (right) returned to the leadership role after O'Byrne's resignation.

Rebecca White resigned as Labor leader on 15 May 2021, endorsing shadow treasurer David O'Byrne to replace her. On 15 June 2021, it was announced that O'Byrne had been elected as leader of the Tasmanian Labor Party against opponent Shane Broad, winning 72% of the members' vote and 75% of party delegates. After allegations of him sexting and kissing a woman without her consent were revealed, David O'Byrne stood aside from his role as leader of the Labor Party for the length of an investigation on 30 June 2021, with Anita Dow acting as leader during the interim. This was followed by O'Byrne announcing he would resign as leader on 4 July 2021. On 7 July 2021, Rebecca White was elected as leader after a meeting of the Labor parliamentary caucus.

=== Resignation of Peter Gutwein ===
On 4 April 2022, Premier Peter Gutwein announced he would quit politics, resigning as Premier and as a member for Bass following the appointment of a new Premier. Jeremy Rockliff, who had been the deputy Liberal leader for 16 years, officially replaced Gutwein as Premier on 8 April 2022, with Bass MP Michael Ferguson as his deputy.

=== Restoration of 35 seats in Assembly ===
On 25 May 2022, Premier Rockliff announced his intention to table a bill in State Parliament to restore the state's House of Assembly to 35 seats before the end of 2022. The bill restored the size of parliament to its original number before the reductions to 25 seats was implemented at the 1998 election. The change will come into effect at this election. The legislation was supported by the Liberals, Labor, Greens and independent Kristie Johnston. It became law upon its assent by the Governor in December 2022.

=== Minority government and a snap election ===
On 11 May 2023, MPs Lara Alexander and John Tucker resigned as members of the Tasmanian Liberal Party and from all parliamentary committees, and served the remainder of their terms as independents on the crossbench. This left the Liberal party in minority government and requiring seven seats to reach a majority in the next state election. Tucker and Alexander both agreed to provide the government with confidence and supply.

On 4 January 2024, Tucker threatened to withdraw his support for the government if it failed to act on his demands for mandatory CCTV in all abattoirs in the state and the cessation of planning for a professional sports training facility at Rosny Parklands and a 25,000-seat stadium at Macquarie Point for an Australian Football League (AFL) team in 2028. In response Rockliff stated in an interview on 2 February, that he would ask the Governor for a snap election if Tucker and Alexander failed to agree on a new governing deal that required the two MPs to not support proposals or changes to legislation raised by Labor, Green or other independent MPs in parliament without the permission of the government. On 13 February, Rockliff announced that the Liberal party room had endorsed a snap election due to there being no agreement reached between the government and the independent MPs. The following day Rockliff visited Governor Barbara Baker at Government House, who accepted his request for an election to be held on 23 March 2024.

=== Changes in parliamentary composition ===
Since the 2021 election, there were a number of changes within the Tasmanian Parliament which affected the balance of power in the chamber.

Seat	Before		Change		After		
Seat	Member	Party	Type	Date	Date	Member	Party
Braddon	Adam Brooks	Liberal	Resignation	14 March 2021	3 June 2021	Felix Ellis	Liberal
Franklin	David O'Byrne	Labor	Defection	23 August 2021		David O'Byrne	Independent Labor
Bass	Sarah Courtney	Liberal	Resignation	10 February 2022	25 March 2022	Lara Alexander	Liberal
Bass	Peter Gutwein	Liberal	Resignation	8 April 2022	25 April 2022	Simon Wood	Liberal
Franklin	Jacquie Petrusma	Liberal	Resignation	25 July 2022	16 August 2022	Dean Young	Liberal
Bass	Lara Alexander	Liberal	Defection	11 May 2023		Lara Alexander	Independent
Lyons	John Tucker	Liberal	Defection	11 May 2023		John Tucker	Independent
Clark	Cassy O'Connor	Greens	Resignation	13 July 2023	1 August 2023	Vica Bayley	Greens
Clark	Elise Archer	Liberal	Defection	29 September 2023		Elise Archer	Independent
Clark	Elise Archer	Independent	Resignation	4 October 2023	24 October 2023	Simon Behrakis	Liberal
Franklin	David O'Byrne	Independent Labor	Defection	4 February 2024		David O'Byrne	Independent

== Candidates ==
A record 167 candidates nominated.

=== Parties ===
Seven parties are registered with the Tasmanian Electoral Commission (TEC). The list of parties registered are:

- Animal Justice
- Labor
- Liberal
- Shooters, Fishers and Farmers
- Greens
- Jacqui Lambie Network
- The Local Network

=== Status ===
Parties	Leader(s)	Ideology	Position	Seats			Status
Parties	Leader(s)	Ideology	Position	Last election	Before election	After election	Status
Liberal	Jeremy Rockliff	Liberalism; Liberal conservatism	Centre-right	13 / 25	11 / 25	14 / 35	Minority government
Labor	Rebecca White	Social democracy	Centre-left	9 / 25	8 / 25	10 / 35	Opposition
Greens	Rosalie Woodruff	Green politics Progressivism	Left-wing	2 / 25	2 / 25	5 / 35	Crossbench
Lambie Network	Jacqui Lambie	Populism	Big tent	0 / 25	0 / 25	3 / 35	Crossbench (With confidence and supply)
Independents	—N/a	—N/a	Various	1 / 25	4 / 25	3 / 35	Crossbench

== Campaign ==
On 29 February 2024, Rockliff stated that if re-elected, his government would remove the protections from 40,000 hectares of protected native forest, allowing them to be logged.

On 10 March 2024, Rockliff committed A$12 million to support building a "chocolate experience" centre near the Hobart Cadbury factory, which would include the "world's largest chocolate fountain".

On 11 March 2024, White put forth plans for a shared-equity housing scheme that would allow couples earning under $200,000 and singles earning under $150,000 to partake in a deal with the government, allowing them to buy a property without a deposit, and the government retaining a 20% share of the property.

On 14 March 2024, social media erupted after a mock website of the Jacqui Lambie Network was discovered online. The URL (lambienetwork.com) is said by various media outlets to be shockingly similar to Lambie's true website, (lambienetwork.com.au). The page is owned by the Liberals as is evident by authorisation details on the page. The page itself is a mock-up of the style of the valid page, instead criticising Senator Lambie and her candidates for a lack of policies in the upcoming election. Lambie described herself as "absolutely ropable" when she became aware of the page. When Premier Rockliff was asked about the page, he stated, "We have every right to point out the policy failings of all political parties." The Tasmanian Electoral Commission has been contacted about the page.

On 17 March 2024, Rockliff announced an intention to amend the Tasmanian Constitution to add a clause that would legislate that if an MP left the party on which they were elected, they would vacate their seat of parliament. The proposed amendment has been criticised by various officials, including former-Liberal turned independent MP, John Tucker. Tucker designated the legislation as "Rocky's rule or else." Among other criticisms. Rockliff describes it as the only way to ensure a stable government continues throughout the term. Labor candidate for Franklin, Dean Winter, speculates the legislation may be in attempt to prevent candidate Eric Abetz from diverging from the Liberals in event of disagreement on same-sex conversion laws, of which Abetz has countering views to his party.

On 20 March 2024, during the Sky News Australia Peoples Forum debate between White and Rockliff, White pledged that if a Labor government was elected in this election, they will construct a public elective surgery hospital in New Town, Tasmania. The hospital is proposed to have 24 overnight beds, along with 8 theatres. The budget is expected to be $160m, and would be completed by 2027.

The Jacqui Lambie Network ran for parliament without any policy agenda.

== Opinion polling ==
Polling is regularly conducted for Tasmanian state politics by Enterprise Marketing and Research Services (EMRS). The sample size for each EMRS poll is 1,000 Tasmanian voters.

=== Voting intention ===
Both major parties expressed a dislike in forming coalition, with Labor outright denying a Greens-Labor coalition, and the Liberals refusing to trade policies. The Greens were holding out hope for a coalition, stating they prefer Labor over Liberals in terms of forming a minority government.

House of Assembly (lower house) polling
Date	Firm	Political parties				
Date	Firm	Liberal	Labor	Greens	JLN	Ind/Other
4–5 March 2024	uComms	37%	23%	14%	8%	18%
16–28 February 2024	Redbridge	33%	29%	14%	10%	14%
15–21 February 2024	EMRS	39%	26%	12%	9%	15%
21 December 2023 – 4 January 2024	YouGov	31%	27%	15%	20%	7%
30 November 2023	EMRS	39%	29%	12%	—N/a	19%
15–19 August 2023	EMRS	38%	32%	14%	—N/a	15%
15–19 May 2023	EMRS	36%	31%	15%	—N/a	18%
14–19 February 2023	EMRS	42%	30%	13%	—N/a	15%
8–15 November 2022	EMRS	42%	29%	14%	—N/a	16%
8–11 August 2022	EMRS	41%	31%	13%	—N/a	15%
27 May – 2 June 2022	EMRS	39%	30%	13%	—N/a	18%
28 February – 1 March 2022	EMRS	41%	31%	12%	—N/a	16%
28 November – 5 December 2021	EMRS	49%	26%	13%	—N/a	12%
7–9 August 2021	EMRS	49%	28%	13%	—N/a	10%
1 May 2021	2021 election	48.72%	28.20%	12.38%	—N/a	10.71%

=== Preferred premier ===
Preferred Premier polling
Date	Firm	Party leaders
Date	Firm	Rockliff	White	Unsure
15–21 August 2023	EMRS	42%	39%	18%
15–19 May 2023	EMRS	38%	40%	18%
14–19 February 2023	EMRS	44%	36%	17%
8–15 November 2022	EMRS	46%	34%	18%
8–11 August 2022	EMRS	47%	35%	16%
27 May – 2 June 2022	EMRS	47%	34%	18%
Jeremy Rockliff replaces Peter Gutwein as Premier and Liberal leader
Date	Firm	Party leaders
Date	Firm	Gutwein	White	Unsure
28 February – 1 March 2022	EMRS	52%	33%	14%
28 November – 5 December 2021	EMRS	59%	29%	12%
7–9 August 2021	EMRS	59%	28%	11%

== Results ==
Party	Votes	%	+/–	Seats	+/–
Liberal	127,837	36.67	▼12.05	14	▲1
Labor	101,113	29.00	▲0.80	10	▲1
Greens	48,430	13.89	▲1.51	5	▲3
Lambie Network	23,260	6.67	▲6.67	3	▲3
Shooters, Fishers and Farmers	8,126	2.33	▼0.71	0	Steady
Animal Justice	5,283	1.52	▲0.11	0	Steady
Local Network	1,028	0.29	▲0.29	0	Steady
Independents	33,535	9.62	▲3.40	3	▲2
Total	348,612	100.00	–	35	▲10
Valid votes	348,612	93.69			
Invalid/blank votes	23,465	6.31	▲1.18		
Total votes	372,077	100.00	–		
Registered voters/turnout	408,197	91.15	▼0.07		
Source: TEC, ABC

=== Primary vote percentages by division ===
	Bass	Braddon	Clark	Franklin	Lyons
Liberal Party	38.0%	45.6%	27.1%	34.0%	37.6%
Labor Party	29.8%	24.7%	30.5%	27.3%	32.8%
Greens	12.0%	6.6%	20.9%	19.8%	10.9%
Lambie	8.1%	11.4%	N/A	4.9%	8.3%
Other	12.0%	11.7%	21.6%	14.0%	10.4%

=== Distribution of seats ===
Electorate	Seats won						
Bass	Michelle O'Byrne	Janie Finlay	Cecily Rosol	Rebekah Pentland	Michael Ferguson	Rob Fairs	Simon Wood
Braddon	Anita Dow	Shane Broad	Craig Garland	Miriam Beswick	Jeremy Rockliff	Felix Ellis	Roger Jaensch
Clark	Ella Haddad	Josh Willie	Vica Bayley	Helen Burnet	Kristie Johnston	Simon Behrakis	Madeleine Ogilvie
Franklin	Dean Winter	Meg Brown	Rosalie Woodruff	David O'Byrne	Eric Abetz	Jacquie Petrusma	Nic Street
Lyons	Rebecca White	Jen Butler	Tabatha Badger	Andrew Jenner	Guy Barnett	Jane Howlett	Mark Shelton

Liberal
Labor
Greens
Lambie Network
Independent

== Aftermath ==
The day after the election, Labor conceded and its leader Rebecca White stated the party was not in a position to form a minority government, causing a leadership election to be held under the party's constitution. Eight months later, White would resign from Tasmanian House of Assembly.

Rockliff reportedly began discussions with elected independents and Jacqui Lambie Network (JLN) candidates to form a Liberal minority government. On 10 April, the Liberal Party and Jacqui Lambie Network announced an agreement had been reached for the latter to provide confidence and supply to the government. The second Rockliff ministry was sworn in by Governor Barbara Baker the following day, as Rockliff revealed independent MP David O'Byrne had provided a written assurance of confidence and supply votes in parliament, thereby enabling the re-elected government to take office. Letters of confidence and supply assurances were signed by O'Byrne and another independent MP, Kristie Johnston, and were released to the public on 24 April 2024. This gave the Liberal government 19 votes out of 35 in parliament to govern.

The JLN-Liberal arrangement lasted in its original form for only four months, as two of the JLN MPs, Rebekah Pentland and Miriam Beswick, were expelled from the party by party leader Jacqui Lambie, who alleged the two MPs no longer represented the "values of accountability, transparency and integrity". Both Pentland and Beswick stated they intended to remain in parliament as independents and later signed a new confidence and supply agreement with the government.

On 16 September 2024, the sole remaining member of the JLN in parliament, Andrew Jenner, confirmed he was not signing a confidence and supply deal with the Liberal government after the last one fell through.
