= First Gutwein ministry =

Tasmanian parliamentary ministry

The First Gutwein Ministry was a Ministry of the Government of Tasmania, led by Peter Gutwein of the Tasmanian Liberals. It was formed on 20 January 2020, after the resignation of Will Hodgman as Premier of Tasmania and the election of Gutwein as Liberal leader. It was replaced by the Second Gutwein Ministry following the 2021 state election.

Portfolio	Minister	Party affiliation	Term start	Term end	Term in office	Image
Premier; Treasurer; Minister for the Environment, Parks and Heritage; Minister for Tourism, Hospitality and Events; Minister for Trade; Minister for Advanced Manufacturing and Defence Industries; Minister for the Prevention of Family Violence	Peter Gutwein MP	Liberal	20 January 2020	19 May 2021	485 days	
Deputy Premier; Minister for Education and Training; Minister for Mental Health and Wellbeing; Minister for Sport and Recreation	Jeremy Rockliff MP	Liberal	20 January 2020	19 May 2021	485 days	
Minister for Infrastructure and Transport; Minister for Science and Technology; Minister for Small Business; Minister for State Growth	Michael Ferguson MP	Liberal	20 January 2020	19 May 2021	485 days	
Attorney-General; Minister for Arts; Minister for Building and Construction; Minister for Corrections; Minister for Justice; Minister for Racing	Elise Archer MP	Liberal	20 January 2020	19 May 2021	485 days	
Minister for Energy; Minister for Primary Industries and Water; Minister for Resources; Minister for Veterans' Affairs	Guy Barnett MP	Liberal	20 January 2020	19 May 2021	485 days	
Minister for Health; Minister for Women	Sarah Courtney MP	Liberal	20 January 2020	19 May 2021	485 days	
Minister for Aboriginal Affairs; Minister for Disability Services and Community Development; Minister for Housing; Minister for Human Services; Minister for Planning	Roger Jaensch MP	Liberal	20 January 2020	19 May 2021	485 days	
Minister for Police, Fire and Emergency Management; Minister for Local Government	Mark Shelton MP	Liberal	20 January 2020	19 May 2021	485 days	

Parliament of Tasmania
Preceded by Second Hodgman Ministry	Cabinet of Tasmania; 2020–2021	Succeeded by Second Gutwein Ministry
