= First Rockliff ministry =

Tasmanian parliamentary ministry

- Cabinet of Tasmania
- Incumbent
- Date formed: 8 April 2022
- Date dissolved: 11 April 2024

People and organisations
- Monarch: Queen Elizabeth II
- Governor: Barbara Baker
- Premier: Jeremy Rockliff
- Premier's history: Premiership of Jeremy Rockliff
- Deputy Premier: Michael Ferguson
- Member party: Liberal
- Status in legislature: Minority
- Opposition party: Labor
- Opposition leader: Rebecca White

History
- Outgoing election: 2021 state election
- Predecessor: Second Gutwein ministry
- Successor: Second Rockliff ministry

The First Rockliff ministry is the former ministry of the Tasmanian Government, led by Jeremy Rockliff of the Tasmanian Liberals. It was formed on 8 April 2022, after Rockliff was elected unopposed as leader of the Liberal Party and sworn as the state's 47th Premier by Governor Barbara Baker. The ministry replaced the Second Gutwein ministry, after former Premier Peter Gutwein resigned from his position and quit politics.

== First arrangement ==
Rockliff was sworn in as Premier and minister for two other departments on 8 April 2022, along with Michael Ferguson as Deputy Premier and Treasurer. The remaining ministerial positions were announced on 11 April, with Jo Palmer elevated to the cabinet. The swearing in by the Governor occurred the following day on 12 April. On 23 July 2023, Rockliff announced another reshuffle, including the creation of a new portfolio (Minister for Stadia and Events, which was created to assist the construction of a new stadium for Tasmania Football Club).

Following bullying allegations against Elise Archer, she resigned from the party in October 2023, relinquishing her ministerial positions. Guy Barnett subsequently assumed the office of Attorney-General of Tasmania.

| Party | Minister | Portfolio | Term start | Term end | Term in office | Image |
|---|---|---|---|---|---|---|
| Liberal | Jeremy Rockliff MP | Premier; Minister for State Development, Trade and the Antarctic; Minister for Tourism and Hospitality; Minister for Mental Health and Wellbeing | 8 April 2022 | 11 April 2024 | 3 years, 136 days | |
| Liberal | Michael Ferguson MP | Deputy Premier; Treasurer; Minister for Infrastructure and Transport; Minister for Planning | 8 April 2022 | 11 April 2024 | 3 years, 136 days | |
| Liberal | Guy Barnett MP | Minister for Health; Minister for Energy and Renewables; Minister for Resources; Minister for Veterans' Affairs; Attorney-General | 12 April 2022 | 11 April 2024 | 3 years, 132 days | |
| Liberal | Felix Ellis MP | Minister for Police, Fire and Emergency Management; Minister for Skills, Training and Workplace Growth; Minister for Resources; Minister for Racing | 12 April 2022 | 11 April 2024 | 3 years, 132 days | |
| Liberal | Roger Jaensch MP | Minister for Education, Children and Youth; Minister for Skills, Training and Workforce Growth; Minister for Environment and Climate Change; Minister for Parks; Minister for Aboriginal Affairs | 12 April 2022 | 11 April 2024 | 3 years, 132 days | |
| Liberal | Madeleine Ogilvie MP | Minister for Small Business; Minister for Advanced Manufacturing and Defence Industries; Minister for Science and Technology; Minister for Heritage; Minister for Women and the Prevention of Family Violence | 12 April 2022 | 11 April 2024 | 3 years, 132 days | |
| Liberal | Jo Palmer MLC | Minister for Primary Industries and Water; Minister for Community Services and Development; Minister for Disability Services; Minister for Women; Deputy Leader of the Legislative Council | 12 April 2022 | 11 April 2024 | 3 years, 132 days | |
| Liberal | Nic Street MP | Minister for Housing and Construction; Minister for Local Government; Minister for Sport and Recreation; Minister for Stadia and Events; Leader of the House | 12 April 2022 | 11 April 2024 | 3 years, 132 days | |

Parliament of Tasmania
| Preceded by Second Gutwein Ministry | Cabinet of Tasmania; 2022–2024 | Succeeded by Second Rockliff Ministry |
