= Second Gutwein ministry =

Tasmanian parliamentary ministry

The Second Gutwein Ministry is a former ministry of the Government of Tasmania, led by Peter Gutwein of the Tasmanian Liberals. It was formed on 19 May 2021, after the Liberal Party won the 2021 Tasmanian state election. The ministry dissolved on 8 April 2022, after Gutwein resigned from his premiership and quit politics, and was succeeded by the Rockliff ministry.

== Final arrangement ==
On 10 February 2022, Sarah Courtney resigned from the cabinet and parliament. A reshuffle was undertaken on 17 February 2022. Roger Jaensch gained the education, skills and children and youth portfolios from Courtney, while Jane Howlett gained disability services and hospitality portfolios from Courtney, but losing the sports portfolio to Nic Street, who was elevated to the cabinet. Street also gained the heritage portfolio from Jaensch, community services and development from Deputy Premier Jeremy Rockliff and science and technology from Michael Ferguson. Ferguson gained local government and planning from Jaensch.

A week later, Howlett resigned from the cabinet, and all her portfolios were taken over by Madeleine Ogilvie on 28 February who was elevated to cabinet.

Portfolio	Minister	Party affiliation	Image
Premier; Treasurer; Minister for Climate Change; Minister for Tourism	Peter Gutwein MP	Liberal	
Deputy Premier; Minister for Health; Minister for Advanced Manufacturing and Defence Industries; Minister for Mental Health and Wellbeing	Jeremy Rockliff MP	Liberal	
Attorney-General; Minister for Justice; Minister for Corrections; Minister for the Arts; Minister for Workplace Safety and Consumer Affairs	Elise Archer MP	Liberal	
Leader of the House; Minister for Infrastructure and Transport; Minister for Finance; Minister for State Development, Construction and Housing; Minister for Local Government and Planning	Michael Ferguson MP	Liberal	
Minister for Primary Industries and Water; Minister for Resources; Minister for Trade; Minister for Veterans' Affairs; Minister for Energy and Emissions Reduction	Guy Barnett MP	Liberal	
Minister for Sport and Recreation; Minister for Heritage; Minister for Science and Technology; Minister for Community Services and Development	Nic Street MP	Liberal	
Minister for Racing; Minister for Women; Minister for Small Business; Minister for Hospitality and Events; Minister for Disability Services	Jane Howlett MLC (until 25 February 2022)	Liberal	
Minister for Racing; Minister for Women; Minister for Small Business; Minister for Hospitality and Events; Minister for Disability Services	Madeleine Ogilvie MP (since 28 February 2022)	Liberal	
Minister for Aboriginal Affairs; Minister for State Growth; Minister for Skills, Training and Workforce Growth; Minister for Environment; Minister for Education, Children and Youth	Roger Jaensch MP	Liberal	
Minister for Parks; Minister for Police, Fire and Emergency Management; Minister for the Prevention of Family Violence	Jacquie Petrusma MP	Liberal	
Source: Premier of Tasmania – Cabinet

== First arrangement ==
Portfolio	Minister	Party affiliation	Image
Premier; Treasurer; Minister for Climate Change; Minister for Tourism	Peter Gutwein MP	Liberal	
Deputy Premier; Minister for Health; Minister for Advanced Manufacturing and Defence Industries; Minister for Mental Health and Wellbeing; Minister for Community Services and Development	Jeremy Rockliff MP	Liberal	
Attorney-General; Minister for Justice; Minister for Corrections; Minister for the Arts; Minister for Workplace Safety and Consumer Affairs	Elise Archer MP	Liberal	
Minister for Science and Technology; Leader of the House; Minister for Infrastructure and Transport; Minister for Finance; Minister for State Development, Construction and Housing	Michael Ferguson MP	Liberal	
Minister for Primary Industries and Water; Minister for Resources; Minister for Trade; Minister for Veterans' Affairs; Minister for Energy and Emissions Reduction	Guy Barnett MP	Liberal	
Minister for Education; Minister for Skills, Training and Workforce Growth; Minister for Children and Youth; Minister for Hospitality and Events; Minister for Disability Services	Sarah Courtney MP	Liberal	
Minister for Sport and Recreation; Minister for Racing; Minister for Women; Minister for Small Business	Jane Howlett MLC	Liberal	
Minister for Aboriginal Affairs; Minister for State Growth; Minister for Heritage; Minister for Local Government and Planning; Minister for Environment	Roger Jaensch MP	Liberal	
Minister for Parks; Minister for Police, Fire and Emergency Management; Minister for the Prevention of Family Violence	Jacquie Petrusma MP	Liberal	
Source: Premier of Tasmania – Cabinet

Parliament of Tasmania
Preceded by First Gutwein Ministry	Cabinet of Tasmania; 2021–2022	Succeeded by Rockliff ministry
