= Gutwein Ministry =

Gutwein Ministry can refer to:

- First Gutwein Ministry (2020–2021)
- Second Gutwein Ministry (2021–2022)
