= Jacquie Petrusma =

Australian politician

The Honourable Jacquie Petrusma MP

36th Speaker of the Tasmanian House of Assembly
- Incumbent
- Assumed office 19 August 2025
- Preceded by: Michelle O'Byrne

Member of the Tasmanian House of Assembly for Franklin
- Incumbent
- Assumed office 23 March 2024 Serving with 6 others
- In office 20 March 2010 – 25 July 2022
Succeeded by	Dean Young	
Former ministries
Minister for Health
In office 20 October 2024 – 11 August 2025
Premier	Jeremy Rockliff
Preceded by	Guy Barnett
Minister for Aboriginal Affairs
In office 20 October 2024 – 11 August 2025
Premier	Jeremy Rockliff
Preceded by	Roger Jaensch
Minister for Veterans' Affairs
In office 20 October 2024 – 11 August 2025
Premier	Jeremy Rockliff
Preceded by	Guy Barnett

Personal details
- Born: Jacqueline Anne Harper; 23 March 1966 (age 60) Launceston, Tasmania, Australia
- Party: Liberal Party (since 2009)
- Other political affiliations: Family First Party (until 2009)
- Spouses: Bretton Smith (m. 1987; div. 1993) Tim Petrusma (m. 1999)
- Education: University of Tasmania
- Website: Personal website

Jacqueline Anne Petrusma (née Harper; born 23 March 1966) is an Australian politician. She is a Liberal Party member of the Tasmanian House of Assembly since 2024, representing the electorate of Franklin, having previously represented the electorate from 2010–2022. Petrusma has served as a minister in the governments of Will Hodgman, Peter Gutwein and Jeremy Rockliff. She currently serves as the 36th Speaker of the Tasmanian House of Assembly, having been elected to the position on 19 August 2025.

== Personal life ==
The daughter of Barry Harper, a former state cricketer, she was born in Launceston, Tasmania, and worked as a registered nurse before becoming involved in politics. She is married to a nephew of former MLC Hank Petrusma.

Petrusma was educated at Glen Dhu Primary School, Kings Meadows High School, Launceston College and the University of Tasmania, where she graduated with a Bachelor of Commerce (Marketing) in 1995. She has one child from her first marriage, has three children from her second.

== Politics ==
She stood for the Senate in the 2004 federal election as a Family First Party candidate, coming close to defeating the Greens' Christine Milne on preferences. She contested the Senate again for the party at the 2007 election, but was unsuccessful.

=== Member for Franklin ===
In 2009, she became a member of the Liberal Party and was endorsed as a candidate for Franklin at the 2010 state election, defeating Clarence City Councillor Tony Mulder for the second Liberal seat.

She became Minister for Human Services and Minister for Women in the Hodgman Ministry when the Liberal Party won government in March 2014, and Minister for Sport and Recreation, Minister for Disability Services and Community Development, Minister for Aboriginal Affairs and again Minister for Women after the March 2018 election and served in this capacity until resigning from these portfolios in July 2019 due to ongoing health issues with a cochlear implant. Petrusma later became Deputy Speaker of the Parliament of Tasmania and Chairman of Committees.

In August 2019, Petrusma was granted the right to use the title "Honourable" for life.

Petrusma was reappointed to the cabinet in the Second Gutwein ministry following the 2021 state election. She was appointed Minister for Parks, Minister for Police, Fire and Emergency Management and Minister for the Prevention of Family Violence.

She resigned from the ministry and from parliament on 25 July 2022, citing family reasons.

Petrusma again stood as a Liberal candidate for Franklin at the 2024 Tasmanian state election, and was re-elected. On 20 October 2024 she was appointed Minister for Health, Minister for Aboriginal Affairs and Minister for Veterans' Affairs in the Second Rockliff ministry.

Petrusma again stood for re-election at the 2025 Tasmanian state election. During the campaign she suffered a serious hamstring injury requiring surgery, weeks of home recovery and extensive physical therapy. She then pulled out of subsequent election campaigning, and after re-election stood down from her ministerial portfolios to focus on rehabilitation when Jeremy Rockliff was appointing his Third Rockliff ministry.

Following the 2025 state election, Petrusma was nominated as the Liberal candidate for speaker of the Tasmanian House of Assembly, contesting the election against Labor candidate Jen Butler. She was elected as speaker, with 25 of the 35 votes.

Political offices
Preceded by Rebecca White	Minister for Human Services; 2014–2018	Succeeded by Roger Jaensch
New ministerial post	Minister for Women; 2014–2019	Succeeded by Sarah Courtney
New ministerial post	Minister for Disability Services and Community Development; 2018–2019	Succeeded by Roger Jaensch
Preceded by Will Hodgman	Minister for Aboriginal Affairs; 2018–2019	Succeeded by Roger Jaensch
Preceded by Will Hodgman	Minister for Sport and Recreation; 2018–2019	Succeeded by Jeremy Rockliff
Preceded by Mark Shelton	Deputy Speaker of the House of Assembly; 2019–2021	Succeeded by Nic Street
Preceded by Mark Shelton	Chairman of Committees; 2019–2021	Succeeded by Nic Street
Preceded by Michelle O'Byrne	Speaker of the Tasmanian House of Assembly; 2025–present	Incumbent
