= Rockliff ministry =

Rockliff ministry may refer to:

- First Rockliff ministry
- Second Rockliff ministry
