= 2024 Tasmanian government formation =

Parliamentary government formation in an Australian state

Following the results of the 2024 Tasmanian state election, which resulted in a hung parliament with the Liberal Party winning the most seats, the incumbent Liberal government, led by Premier Jeremy Rockliff, was required to negotiate with independents and the Jacqui Lambie Network (JLN) to seek confidence and supply to form a minority government for the party's fourth consecutive term in office.

The Labor opposition, led by Opposition Leader Rebecca White, was not in a position to form a government. White conceded defeat the day after the election, stating that Labor could not realistically form a government, even with the support of the Greens, led by Rosalie Woodruff. White also resigned as Labor leader after leading the party to defeat for a third time under her leadership. She was succeeded by Franklin MP Dean Winter, who was elected unopposed to the position.

== Background ==
The snap 2024 Tasmanian election was called due to demands from Liberal turned independent MPs John Tucker and Lara Alexander that a proposed 25,000-seat stadium at Macquarie Point be canceled and the use of CCTV in abattoirs be mandated. Premier Rockliff stated he would ask Governor Barbara Baker for a snap election if Alexander and Tucker could not reach a governing arrangement with the Liberal Party in which they would not support legislation, motions or other parliamentary procedures put forward by the Labor Party, Greens or independent MPs. Alexander and Tucker were not re-elected.

This election delivered a hung parliament, with no party winning an absolute majority (over half) of the 35 available seats. 18 seats are required for a majority in the 35 seat House of Assembly.

The Liberal Party was the largest party following the election with 14 seats, the Labor Party won 10 seats, 5 seats were won by the Greens, 3 seats were won by the JLN, and 3 seats were won by independents.

== Potential alliances ==
Before White conceded defeat, many proposals had been considered possible. One potential alliance was the "traffic light alliance" or the "traffic light coalition", which was a hypothetical alliance or coalition between Labor, the Greens and the JLN. The hypothetical alliance or coalition's name is derived from the colours of the three parties, which are the colours used on traffic lights: red (Labor), yellow (JLN) and green (Greens), similar to Germany's traffic light coalition.

== Rockliff government formation ==
Due to Labor having conceded, the Rockliff Liberal government continued governing Tasmania for another four-year term, with Rockliff remaining Premier. At the time of the election, Tasmania was the only state with a Liberal Premier. Rockliff ruled out working with the Greens, and ruled out forming a coalition government as that would require some crossbenchers to be given cabinet portfolios. He also stated that he will not compromise on his 2030 Strong Plan policy. On 10 April 2024, the three elected JLN MPs announced they had reached a deal to support the Rockliff Government on matters of confidence and supply for an initial 12 month period. The second Rockliff ministry was sworn in the following day with Independent MP David O'Byrne providing written assurance of confidence and supply, giving the Liberal Party the numbers required to form government. Ultimately, both O'Byrne and fellow independent Kristie Johnston signed confidence and supply agreements with the government, giving it 19 of the 35 votes on the floor of the parliament.

The JLN-Liberal arrangement lasted in its original form for only four months, as two of the JLN MPs, Rebekah Pentland and Miriam Beswick, were expelled from the party by party leader Jacqui Lambie, who alleged the two MPs no longer represented the "values of accountability, transparency and integrity". Both Pentland and Beswick stated they intended to remain in parliament as independents and issued a joint statement pledging to sign a new confidence and supply agreement with the government.

On 16 September 2024, the sole remaining member of the JLN in parliament, Andrew Jenner, confirmed he would not be signing a confidence and supply deal with the Liberal government after the last one fell through due to what he said was "electoral bribery".

Confidence and Supply - In Support of the Rockliff Government as of April 2025
Party	Parliamentarian	Division	Since
Independent	David O'Byrne	Franklin	2024
Independent	Miriam Beswick	Braddon	2024
Independent	Rebekah Pentland	Bass	2024
Former Confidence and Supply Parties
Party	Parliamentarian	Division	Revoked Support
Lambie Network	Andrew Jenner	Lyons	2024
Independent	Kristie Johnston	Clark	2025

== See also ==
- 2025 Tasmanian government formation
