= Tasmanian Electoral Commission =

Agency overview
- Formed: 2005
- Jurisdiction: Government of Tasmania
- Website: www.tec.tas.gov.au

The Tasmanian Electoral Commission (TEC) in Tasmania, Australia, established in 2005, is an independent office which conducts parliamentary and local government elections in Tasmania. Elections for the House of Assembly take place every four years, and for the Legislative Council every year on a rotational basis.

The next election for the House of Assembly will be held on 23 March 2024. The next elections for the Legislative Council, for the divisions of Launceston, Murchison and Rumney, will be held in 2023. The next elections for local government councils will be held during September and October 2022.

== See also ==
- Elections in Australia
