= Second Rockliff ministry =

Cabinet of Tasmanian Premier Jeremy Rockliff

- 47th (Note: This is Rockliff's order number as Premier; there is not an available source to show how many individual Cabinet's there has been since Tasmania was granted responsible government in 1856.) Cabinet of Tasmania

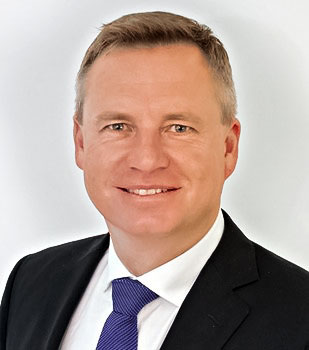
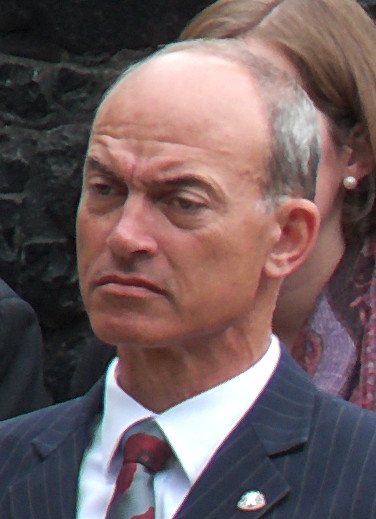
- Jeremy Rockliff (Premier) Guy Barnett (Deputy Premier)
- Date formed: 11 April 2024
- Date dissolved: 11 August 2025

People and organisations
- Monarch: Charles III
- Governor: Barbara Baker
- Premier: Jeremy Rockliff
- Premier's history: Premiership of Jeremy Rockliff
- Deputy Premier: Guy Barnett
- No. of ministers: 14
- Member party: Liberal
- Status in legislature: Minority government; 14 / 35 (40%)
- Opposition cabinet: Winter shadow ministry
- Opposition party: Labor
- Opposition leader: Dean Winter

History
- Election: 2024
- Legislature term: 2024-2025
- Predecessor: First Rockliff ministry
- Successor: Third Rockliff ministry

The Second Rockliff ministry is the former and second cabinet of Premier Jeremy Rockliff that was formed following the final counting of the 2024 Tasmanian state election.

On 5 June 2025, a no-confidence motion in the Premier passed the parliament, with Rockliff stating he would seek a snap election. The snap election resulted in a hung parliament, with Rockliff confident he will retain the support of the crossbench.

This ministry was succeeded by Rockliff's incoming third ministry on 11 August 2025.

== Cabinet Members ==
The Second Rockliff ministry was sworn in on 11 April 2024. The table of ministers can be found below.

=== Current composition ===
Second Rockliff ministry
Minister	Jeremy Rockliff MP	Guy Barnett MP
Minister for	Premier Tourism Trade and Major Investment	Deputy Premier Attorney-General Treasurer Justice
Department administered	Premier and Cabinet Tourism Tasmania State Growth	Justice Treasury and Finance
Minister	Eric Abetz MP	Madeleine Ogilvie MP
Minister for	Business, Industry and Resources Transport	Innovation, Science and Digital Economy Corrections and Rehabilitation Environment Arts and Heritage
Department administered	State Growth	State Growth Justice Natural Resources and Environment
Minister	Nick Duigan MLC	Felix Ellis MP
Minister for	Energy and Renewables Parks Sport and Events	Police, Fire and Emergency Management Housing, Planning and Consumer Affairs Skills and Training
Department administered	State Growth	Justice Communities State Growth
Minister	Jane Howlett MP	Roger Jaensch MP
Minister for	Primary Industries and Water Hospitality and Small Business Racing	Children and Young People Mental Health and Wellbeing Community Services Finance
Department administered	Natural Resources and Environment State Growth	Education, Children and Young People Health Communities Treasury and Finance
Minister	Jo Palmer MLC	Jacquie Petrusma MP
Minister for	Education Disability Services Women and the Prevention of Family Violence	Health Aboriginal Affairs Indigenous Affairs
Department administered	Education Health	Health
Minister	Kerry Vincent MLC	
Minister for	Infrastructure; Local Government	
Department administered	Infrastructure; Local Government	
Assistant Ministry
Assistant Minister	Simon Behrakis MP	Rob Fairs MP
Assistant Minister for	Assistant to the Premier Housing and Planning	Youth Engagement
Department administered	Premier and Cabinet State Growth	Education, Children and Young People
Assistant Minister	Simon Wood MP	
Assistant Minister for	Health, Mental Health and Wellbeing	
Department administered	Health	

=== Second composition ===
Party	Minister	Portfolio	From
Liberal	Jeremy Rockliff	Premier; Minister for Tourism and Hospitality; Minister for Trade and Major Investment	11 April 2024
Liberal	Guy Barnett	Deputy Premier Treasurer Attorney-General Minister for Justice	11 April 2024
Liberal	Kerry Vincent	Minister for Infrastructure Minister for Local Government	11 April 2024
Liberal	Felix Ellis	Minister for Housing and Planning and Consumer Affairs; Minister for Police, Fire and Emergency Management; Minister for Skills and Training	11 April 2024
Liberal	Eric Abetz	Minister for Business, Industry and Resources; Minister for Transport; Leader of the House	11 April 2024
Liberal	Nick Duigan	Minister for Energy and Renewables; Minister for Parks Minister for Sport and Events	11 April 2024
Liberal	Jo Palmer	Minister for Education; Minister for Disability Services; Minister for Women and the Prevention of Family Violence	11 April 2024
Liberal	Roger Jaensch	Minister for Children and Youth; Minister for Community Services; Minister for Mental Health and Wellbeing Minister for Finance	11 April 2024
Liberal	Jane Howlett	Minister for Primary Industries and Water; Minister for Racing Minister for Hospitality and Small Business	11 April 2024
Liberal	Madeleine Ogilvie	Minister for Innovation, Science, and the Digital Economy; Minister for Corrections and Rehabilitation; Minister for Arts and Heritage; Minister for the Environment	11 April 2024
Liberal	Jacquie Petrusma	Minister for Health Minister for Aboriginal Affairs Minister for Veterans’ Affairs	11 April 2024
Liberal	Simon Wood	Parliamentary Secretary for Mental Health and Wellbeing; Government Whip	11 April 2024
Liberal	Simon Behrakis	Parliamentary Secretary for Housing and Planning	11 April 2024
Liberal	Leonie Hiscutt	Leader of the Government in the Legislative Council	11 April 2024

=== Original composition ===
Party	Minister	Portfolio	From
Liberal	Jeremy Rockliff	Premier; Minister for Tourism and Hospitality; Minister for Trade and Major Investment	11 April 2024
Liberal	Michael Ferguson	Deputy Premier; Treasurer; Minister for Infrastructure	11 April 2024
Liberal	Guy Barnett	Attorney-General; Minister for Justice; Minister for Health, Mental Health and Wellbeing; Minister for Veterans' Affairs	11 April 2024
Liberal	Felix Ellis	Minister for Housing and Planning; Minister for Police, Fire and Emergency Management; Minister for Skills and Training	11 April 2024
Liberal	Eric Abetz	Minister for Business, Industry and Resources; Minister for Transport; Leader of the House	11 April 2024
Liberal	Nick Duigan	Minister for Energy and Renewables; Minister for Parks and Environment	11 April 2024
Liberal	Jo Palmer	Minister for Education; Minister for Disability Services; Deputy Leader for the Government in the Legislative Council	11 April 2024
Liberal	Roger Jaensch	Minister for Children and Youth; Minister for Community Services; Minister for Aboriginal Affairs	11 April 2024
Liberal	Jane Howlett	Minister for Primary Industries and Water; Minister for Racing	11 April 2024
Liberal	Madeleine Ogilvie	Minister for Small Business and Consumer Affairs; Minister for Corrections and Rehabilitation; Minister for Arts; Minister for Women and the Prevention of Family Violence	11 April 2024
Liberal	Nic Street	Minister for Finance; Minister for Local Government; Minister for Sport and Events	11 April 2024
Liberal	Jacquie Petrusma	Parliamentary Secretary to the Premier	11 April 2024
Liberal	Simon Wood	Parliamentary Secretary for Mental Health and Wellbeing; Government Whip	11 April 2024
Liberal	Simon Behrakis	Parliamentary Secretary for Housing and Planning	11 April 2024
Liberal	Leonie Hiscutt	Leader of the Government in the Legislative Council	11 April 2024

== Notes ==
Parliament of Tasmania
Preceded by First Rockliff ministry	Cabinet of Tasmania; 2022–2025	Succeeded by Third Rockliff ministry
