= Simon Wood (politician) =

Australian politician (born 1976)

Simon Wood MP

Member of the Tasmanian House of Assembly for Bass
- In office 26 April 2022 – 19 July 2025
- Preceded by: Peter Gutwein
- Succeeded by: George Razay

Parliamentary Secretary for Health, Mental Health and Wellbeing
- In office 11 April 2024 – 19 July 2025
- Minister: Jacquie Petrusma

Personal details
- Born: 14 October 1976 (age 49) Launceston, Tasmania
- Party: Liberal Party

Simon Robert Francis Wood (born 14 October 1976) is an Australian politician. He had been a Liberal member of the Tasmanian House of Assembly for Bass from 2022 to 2025 and served as the Parliamentary Secretary to the Premier.

He served on Launceston City Council from 2014 to 2018, and at the time of his election was a staffer to Senator Wendy Askew. Wood was elected to the House of Assembly in a recount following the resignation of the then Premier Peter Gutwein.

He was defeated at the 2025 Tasmanian state election.
