= Madeleine Ogilvie =

Australian lawyer and politician

The Honourable Madeleine Ogilvie MP

Minister for Community and Multicultural Affairs
- In office 7 August 2025 – 30 May 2026
- Premier: Jeremy Rockliff
- Preceded by: office created
- Succeeded by: Roger Jaensch

Minister for Innovation, Science and the Digital Economy
- In office 20 October 2024 – 30 May 2026
- Premier: Jeremy Rockliff
- Preceded by: herself (as Minister for Science and Technology)
- Succeeded by: Felix Ellis

Minister for the Environment
- In office 11 April 2024 – 30 May 2026
- Premier: Jeremy Rockliff
- Succeeded by: Guy Barnett

Minister for Arts and Heritage
- In office 11 April 2024 – 30 May 2026
- Premier: Jeremy Rockliff
- Succeeded by: Roger Jaensch

Minister for Corrections and Rehabilitation
- In office 11 April 2024 – 7 August 2025
- Premier: Jeremy Rockliff
- Succeeded by: Guy Barnett

Member of the Tasmanian Parliament for Clark
- Incumbent
- Assumed office 11 September 2019 Serving with 6 others
- Preceded by: Scott Bacon

Member of the Tasmanian Parliament for Denison
- In office 15 March 2014 – 3 March 2018
- Preceded by: Graeme Sturges

Personal details
- Born: 25 January 1969 (age 57) Hobart, Tasmania
- Party: Liberal (since 2021)
- Other political affiliations: Independent (2019–2021); Labor (until 2019)
- Education: University of Melbourne; University of Tasmania; University of New South Wales
- Profession: lawyer

Madeleine Ruth Ogilvie (born 25 January 1969) is an Australian lawyer and politician. She is a Liberal Party member of the Tasmanian House of Assembly representing the Division of Clark and previously served as a minister in the second Rockliff and third Rockliff ministries.

Ogilvie was previously a Labor Party member representing the Division of Denison (the predecessor of Clark) between 2014 and 2018, when she was defeated at the 2018 state election. She re-entered parliament as an independent member representing Clark in September 2019 after a recount, and then joined the Liberal Party to contest the 2021 state election.

== Early life and education ==
Ogilvie grew up in Lenah Valley, Tasmania. She was educated at The Friends' School, Hobart College and the University of Melbourne, where she resided at Ormond College and graduated with a Bachelor of Arts in Classical Studies. She later obtained a Bachelor of Laws from the University of Tasmania, and a Graduate Certificate in Business from the Australian Graduate School of Management.

== Legal career ==
Ogilvie was admitted as a barrister and solicitor in 1994. She was a lawyer at the Insurance and Superannuation Commission, Allens and CSIRO.

She then worked for UNESCO in France on international cultural heritage law, Indonesia on telecommunications infrastructure projects, and the United States of America, in Silicon Valley. She was later General Manager Commercial and Contracts with Telstra Corporation responsible for some of Australia's largest telecommunications deals. Ogilvie returned to Hobart, Tasmania to raise her family.

In 2006, she established a legal practice in Hobart, Ogilvie and Associates. Ogilvie is known for her advocacy of refugee rights.

== Political career ==
Ogilvie first stood for election to the Tasmanian House of Assembly in the 2010 state election. She received 522 first preference votes, but was not elected.

She was elected at the March 2014 election, receiving 2,156 votes and being the fifth of five candidates elected for the Denison division under the state's Hare-Clark system. Ogilvie was the only new Labor member elected in an election that saw the Labor Party lose government and several seats.

Following the 2014 election, Ogilvie was appointed Shadow Minister for Corrections, Aboriginal Affairs, Small Business, Information Technology and Innovation, and Multicultural Affairs, as well as being appointed Opposition Whip.

Ogilvie briefly made local headlines in December 2015 after voting, in a free vote, against a Greens motion supporting marriage equality on the basis that it is a federal legislative reform, and in particular her online reaction to the Left faction of the Tasmanian Labor Party drawing a chalk rainbow and writing critical messages outside her electorate office. Members of the Left called for Ogilvie to be expelled from the party for not supporting the motion.

Ogilvie again came under fire from Labor's Left faction at the Party's 2017 State Conference when she voted against a bill to allow euthanasia in Tasmania. Labor leader Rebecca White allowed a conscience vote, as the motion was put forward as a private member's bill.

Ogilvie is an advocate against pokies and revenge porn. Her stance on pokies was later adopted by the Party. She has also advocated for statewide discussion on Aboriginal treaty rights.

At the 2018 state election, Ogilve attempted to seek re-election to the Division of Denison but was not elected. After Scott Bacon resigned, in March 2019, Ogilve returned to the House of Assembly as an independent, representing the Division of Clark (renamed from Denison). Shortly after the 2021 state election was called, she joined the Liberal Party and ran for re-election in Clark. She was narrowly elected to the fifth and last seat of Clark after 11 days of counting and beating Liberal-turned-independent and speaker Sue Hickey to the position. Her win allowed the Liberals to cling to a one-seat majority. On 28 February 2022, she was appointed as Minister for Hospitality and Events, Minister for Racing, Minister for Small Business, Minister for Women and Minister for Disability Services, taking over from Jane Howlett who resigned earlier that week.

Six weeks later, on 12 April 2022, she was appointed as Minister for Small Business, Minister for Advanced Manufacturing and Defence Industries, Minister for Science and Technology, Minister for Racing and Minister for Heritage, after Jeremy Rockliff succeeded Peter Gutwein as Premier.

Ogilvie resigned from her cabinet positions on 30 May 2026 following revelations she misled parliament during budget estimates in November 2025. When responding to questioning, Ogilvie stated she was not a party to any matters before the Supreme Court of Tasmania, however she later corrected her position stating she has brought forward a case to the Supreme Court. This sparked criticism from the Opposition Labor party and the Tasmanian Greens, as it was also disclosed that Ogilvie had spent had spent upwards of $120,000 of tax payer money on the case. Details of the Supreme Court case have not been made public.

== Personal life ==
Ogilvie is the granddaughter of former Member of the House of Assembly Eric Ogilvie, great-niece of former Premier of Tasmania Albert Ogilvie and stepdaughter of former Governor of Tasmania Peter Underwood. She is married to William Doyle, with four children.
