= Rob Fairs =

Australian politician

Rob Fairs MP

Parliamentary Secretary for Youth Engagement
- Incumbent
- Assumed office 11 April 2024
- Minister: Jo Palmer

Member of the Tasmanian House of Assembly for Bass
- Incumbent
- Assumed office 23 March 2024 Serving with 6 others

Personal details
- Born: 7 January 1968 (age 58) Minlaton, South Australia
- Party: Liberal

Robert Ian Fairs (born 7 January 1968) is an Australian politician and media personality who currently serves as a member of the Tasmanian House of Assembly.

Fairs had a career in television and radio before getting into politics, serving as a sports broadcaster for Southern Cross News and an announcer for 89.3 LAFM. He was an ambassador for Mark Webber Challenges before founding his own organisation. The Rob Fairs Foundation helps disadvantaged Tasmanian youth.

Fairs was re-elected at the 2025 Tasmanian state election.
