= Lara Alexander =

Australian politician

Member of the Tasmanian House of Assembly for Bass
- In office 25 February 2022 – 23 March 2024
- Preceded by: Sarah Courtney

Personal details
- Born: 13 July 1967 (age 58) Bucharest, Romania
- Party: Independent (2023–2024)
- Other political affiliations: Liberal (until 2023)

Lara Maria Alexander (born 13 July 1967) is an Australian politician. She was a member of the Tasmanian House of Assembly for the division of Bass since 2022, serving as a member for the Liberal Party before moving to the crossbench as an independent in 2023.

Alexander was born in Romania. She is an accountant and holds a Bachelor of Economic Studies (Honours). She was general manager of Presbyterian Care Tasmania and in 2018 became chief executive officer of the St Vincent de Paul Society in Tasmania. She was an unsuccessful Liberal candidate for Bass at the 2021 Tasmanian state election, and complained during the campaign of being prevented from speaking publicly by Liberal Party headquarters. In February 2022 she filled the vacancy caused by Sarah Courtney's resignation, winning a recount of votes.

On 12 May 2023, ABC News reported that Alexander, alongside fellow Liberal John Tucker, would leave the Liberal Party to sit as an independent, in part due to concerns related to the proposed Macquarie Point Stadium project. This left the Liberal party in minority government and requiring 7 seats to reach a majority in the next state election. At the next state election held in March 2024, Alexander lost her seat.
