= Deputy Premier of Tasmania =

- Tasmanian Coat of arms

- Flag of Tasmania

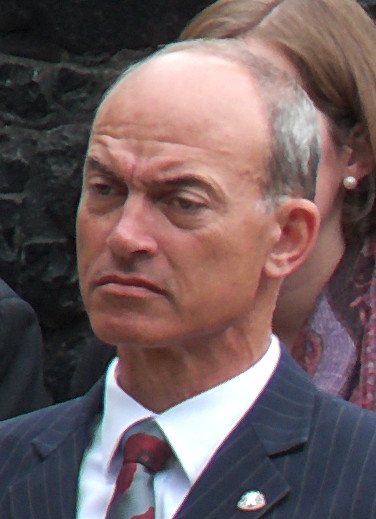
- Incumbent; Guy Barnett since 15 October 2024
- Department of Premier and Cabinet
- Style: The Honourable
- Member of: Parliament; Cabinet; Executive Council
- Reports to: Premier of Tasmania
- Seat: Executive Building; 15 Murray Street, Hobart
- Nominator: Premier of Tasmania
- Appointer: Governor of Tasmania; on the advice of the premier
- Term length: At the governor's pleasure
- Formation: 26 August 1958
- First holder: John James Dwyer

The deputy premier of Tasmania is a role in the Government of Tasmania assigned to a responsible Minister in the Australian state of Tasmania. It has second ranking behind the premier of Tasmania in Cabinet, and its holder serves as acting premier during absence or incapacity of the premier. The deputy premier may either be appointed by the premier during the cabinet formation process, or may be elected by caucus. Due to the contingent role of the deputy premier, they almost without exception have additional ministerial portfolios. The current deputy premier of Tasmania is Guy Barnett.

== List of deputy premiers of Tasmania ==
No.	Portrait	Name Electoral district (Birth–death)	Term of office		Party	Premier
No.	Portrait	Name Electoral district (Birth–death)	Term start	Term end	Party	Premier
1		John Dwyer; MHA for Franklin (1890–1962)	26 August 1958	12 May 1959	Labor	Eric Reece; Labor (1958–1969)
2		Roy Fagan; MHA for Wilmot (1905–1990)	12 May 1959	26 May 1969	Labor	Eric Reece; Labor (1958–1969)
3		Kevin Lyons; MHA for Braddon (1923–2000)	26 May 1969	14 March 1972	Centre	Angus Bethune; Liberal (1969–1972)
4		Merv Everett; MHA for Denison (1917–1988)	3 May 1972	12 April 1974	Labor	Eric Reece; Labor (1972–1975)
5		Bill Neilson; MHA for Franklin (1925–1989)	17 April 1974	31 March 1975	Labor	Eric Reece; Labor (1972–1975)
6		Doug Lowe; MHA for Franklin (born 1942)	31 March 1975	1 December 1977	Labor	Bill Neilson; Labor (1975–1977)
7		Neil Batt; MHA for Denison (born 1937)	1 December 1977	18 December 1979	Labor	Doug Lowe; Labor (1977–1981)
7		Neil Batt; MHA for Denison (born 1937)	25 February 1980	29 August 1980	Labor	Doug Lowe; Labor (1977–1981)
8		Michael Barnard; MHA for Bass (1942–1999)	29 August 1980	27 May 1982	Labor	Doug Lowe; Labor (1977–1981)
8		Michael Barnard; MHA for Bass (1942–1999)	29 August 1980	27 May 1982	Labor	Harry Holgate; Labor (1981–1982)
9		Max Bingham; MHA for Bass (1927–2021)	27 May 1982	13 June 1984	Liberal	Robin Gray; Liberal (1982–1989)
10		Geoff Pearsall; MHA for Franklin (born 1946)	15 June 1984	1 November 1988	Liberal	Robin Gray; Liberal (1982–1989)
11		Ray Groom; MHA for Denison (born 1944)	1 November 1988	29 June 1989	Liberal	Robin Gray; Liberal (1982–1989)
12		Peter Patmore; MHA for Bass (born 1952)	3 July 1989	17 February 1992	Labor	Michael Field; Labor (1989–1992)
13		John Beswick; MHA for Bass (born 1937)	18 February 1992	18 March 1996	Liberal	Ray Groom; Liberal (1982–1989)
14		Sue Napier; MHA for Bass (1948–2010)	18 March 1996	14 September 1998	Liberal	Tony Rundle; Liberal (1996–1998)
15		Paul Lennon; MHA for Franklin (born 1955)	14 September 1998	21 March 2004	Labor	Jim Bacon; Labor (1998–2004)
16		David Llewellyn; MHA for Lyons (born 1942)	22 March 2004	5 April 2006	Labor	Paul Lennon; Labor (2004–2008)
17		Bryan Green; MHA for Braddon (born 1957)	5 April 2006	15 July 2006	Labor	Paul Lennon; Labor (2004–2008)
18		Steve Kons; MHA for Braddon (born 1962)	30 October 2006	9 April 2008	Labor	Paul Lennon; Labor (2004–2008)
19		David Bartlett; MHA for Denison (born 1968)	10 April 2008	26 May 2008	Labor	Paul Lennon; Labor (2004–2008)
20		Lara Giddings; MHA for Franklin (born 1972)	26 May 2008	24 January 2011	Labor	David Bartlett; Labor (2008–2011)
(17)		Bryan Green; MHA for Braddon (born 1957)	24 January 2011	31 March 2014	Labor	Lara Giddings; Labor (2011–2014)
21		Jeremy Rockliff; MHA for Braddon (born 1970)	31 March 2014	8 April 2022	Liberal	Will Hodgman; Liberal (2014–2020)
21		Jeremy Rockliff; MHA for Braddon (born 1970)	31 March 2014	8 April 2022	Liberal	Peter Gutwein; Liberal (2020–2022)
22		Michael Ferguson; MHA for Bass (born 1974)	8 April 2022	14 October 2024	Liberal	Jeremy Rockliff; Liberal (since 2022)
23		Guy Barnett; MHA for Lyons (born 1962)	15 October 2024	Incumbent	Liberal	Jeremy Rockliff; Liberal (since 2022)
