= Treasurer of Tasmania =

- Tasmanian Coat of arms

- Flag of Tasmania

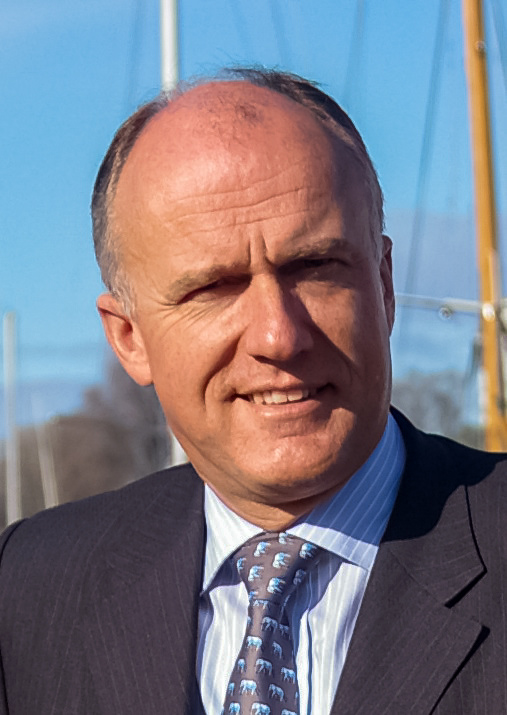
- Incumbent; Eric Abetz since 8 April 2022
- Department of Treasury and Finance
- Style: The Honourable
- Member of: Parliament; Cabinet; Executive Council
- Reports to: Premier of Tasmania
- Seat: Executive Building; 15 Murray Street, Hobart
- Nominator: Premier of Tasmania
- Appointer: Governor of Tasmania; on the advice of the premier
- Term length: At the governor's pleasure
- Formation: 1856
- First holder: Thomas Chapman

Treasurer of Tasmania is the title held by the Cabinet minister who is responsible for the financial management of Tasmania’s budget sector.

== List of Tasmanian treasurers ==
Treasurer	Party	Term
Thomas Chapman		1856–1857
Charles Meredith		1857–1857
Frederick Innes		1857–1862
Thomas Chapman		1862–1863
Charles Meredith		1863–1866
Thomas Chapman		1866–1872
Frederick Innes		1872–1873
Philip Fysh		1873–1875
Frederick Innes		1875–1876
Charles Meredith		1876–1877
William Giblin		1877–1878
David Lewis		1878–1879
William Giblin		1879–1881
John Stokell Dodds		1881–1884
William Burgess	Liberal	1884–1887
Bolton Bird	Revenue Tariff Party	1887–1892
John Henry		1892–1894
Philip Fysh		1894–1898
Edward Braddon	Free Trade	1899
Bolton Bird	Revenue Tariff Party	1899–1903
William Propsting	Liberal-Democrat	1903–1904
Charles Stewart		1904–1905
John Evans	Anti-Socialist	1905–1906
Don Urquhart	Free Trade	1906–1909
Elliott Lewis	Anti-Socialist	1909
James Ogden	Labor	1909
Elliott Lewis	Anti-Socialist	1909–1912
Herbert Payne	Nationalist	1912–1914
Joseph Lyons	Labor	1914–1916
Neil Lewis	Nationalist	1916–1922
Walter Lee	Nationalist	1922–1923
Joseph Lyons	Labor	1923–1928
John McPhee	Nationalist	1928–1934
Walter Lee	Nationalist	1934
Edmund Dwyer-Gray	Labor	1934–1939
Robert Cosgrove	Labor	1939
Edmund Dwyer-Gray	Labor	1939–1945
Robert Cosgrove	Labor	1945–1947
Edward Brooker	Labor	1947–1948
John Madden	Labor	1948–1956
Reg Turnbull	Labor	1956–1958
Robert Cosgrove	Labor	1958
Eric Reece	Labor	1958
Reg Turnbull	Labor	1958–1959
Bill Neilson	Labor	1959
Eric Reece	Labor	1959–1969
Walter Bethune	Liberal	1969–1972
Eric Reece	Labor	1972–1975
William Neilson	Labor	1975–1977
Neil Batt	Labor	1977–1979
Doug Lowe	Labor	1979–1980
Neil Batt	Labor	1980
Doug Lowe	Labor	1980–1981
Harry Holgate	Labor	1981–1982
Robin Gray	Liberal	1982–1989
Michael Field	Labor	1989–1992
Ray Groom	Liberal	1992–1993
Tony Rundle	Liberal	1993–1998
David Crean	Labor	1998–2004
Paul Lennon	Labor	2004–2006
Michael Aird	Labor	2006–2010
Lara Giddings	Labor	2010–2014
Peter Gutwein	Liberal	2014–2022
Michael Ferguson	Liberal	2022–2024
Guy Barnett	Liberal	2024–2025
Eric Abetz	Liberal	2025–
