= Roger Jaensch =

Australian politician

The Honourable Roger Jaensch MP
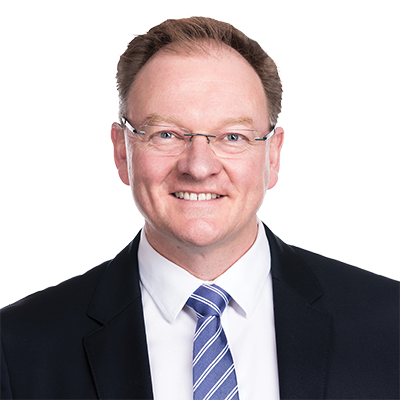

Member of the Tasmanian House of Assembly for Braddon
- Incumbent
- Assumed office 15 March 2014 Serving with 6 others

Minister for Children and Youth
- Incumbent
- Assumed office 11 April 2024
- Premier: Jeremy Rockliff

Minister for Aboriginal Affairs
- In office 11 April 2024 – 20 October 2024
- Premier: Jeremy Rockliff

Minister for Community Services
- Incumbent
- Assumed office 11 April 2024
- Premier: Jeremy Rockliff

Minister for Mental Health and Wellbeing
- Incumbent
- Assumed office 20 October 2024
- Premier: Jeremy Rockliff
- Preceded by: Guy Barnett

Minister for Finance
- Incumbent
- Assumed office 20 October 2024
- Premier: Jeremy Rockliff
- Preceded by: Nic Street

Personal details
- Born: 22 April 1971 (age 55) Ferntree Gully, Victoria
- Party: Liberal Party
- Occupation: Agricultural scientist

Roger Charles Jaensch (born 22 April 1971) is an Australian politician from Wynyard, Tasmania, elected to the Tasmanian House of Assembly for the Liberal Party in the Division of Braddon at the 2014 state election. He studied Science at Monash University and worked agriculturally in southern Africa and Western Australia, then was Executive Chairman of the Cradle Coast Authority and a member of the Tourism Industry Council of Tasmania for ten years. He is married with three children.
