= Peter Gutwein =

46th Premier of Tasmania

The Honourable Peter Gutwein
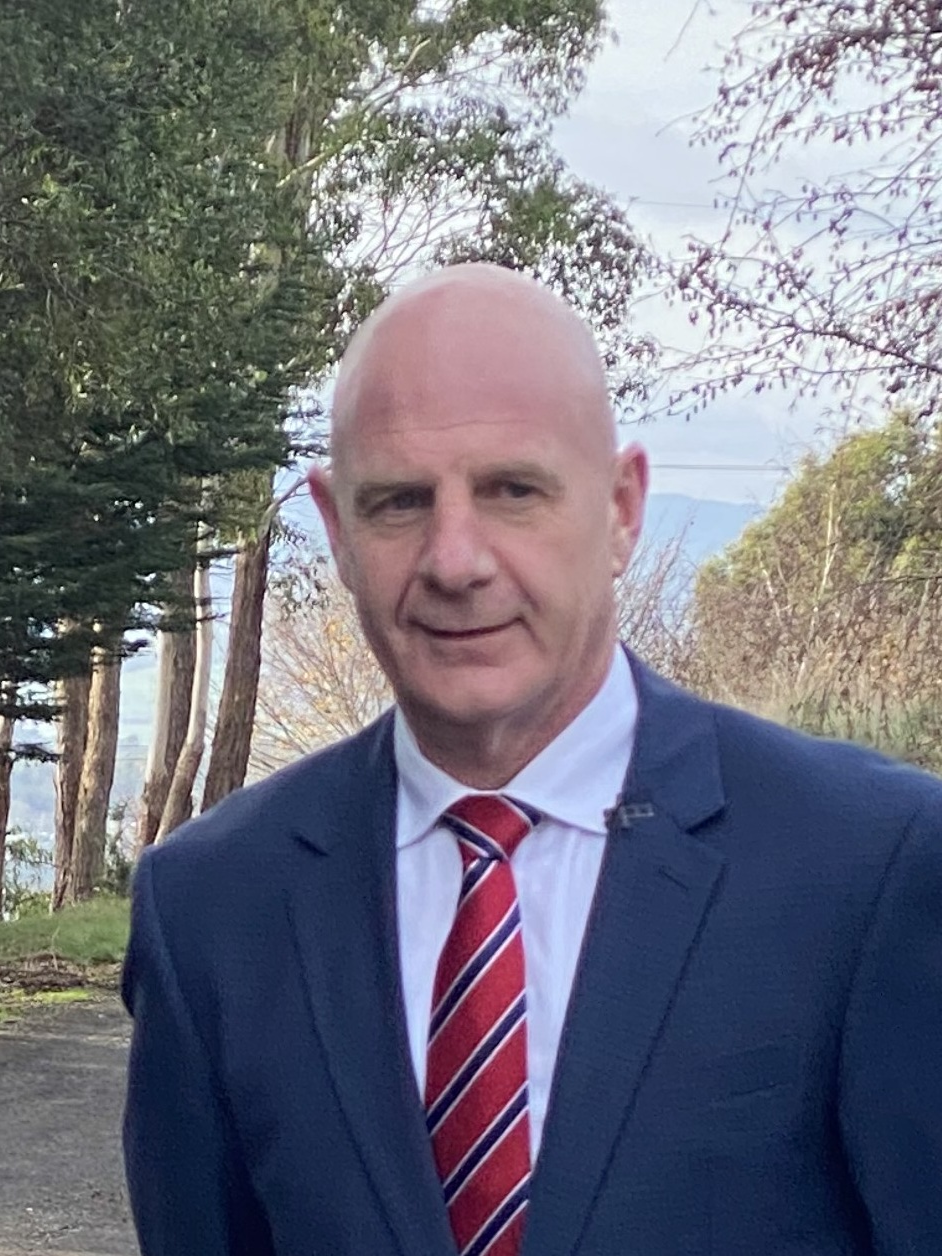
- Gutwein in 2020

46th Premier of Tasmania
- In office 20 January 2020 – 8 April 2022
- Monarch: Elizabeth II
- Governor: Kate Warner; Barbara Baker
- Deputy: Jeremy Rockliff
- Preceded by: Will Hodgman
- Succeeded by: Jeremy Rockliff

Treasurer of Tasmania
- In office 31 March 2014 – 8 April 2022
- Premier: Will Hodgman; Himself
- Preceded by: Lara Giddings
- Succeeded by: Michael Ferguson

Leader of the Liberal Party of Tasmania
- In office 20 January 2020 – 8 April 2022
- Preceded by: Will Hodgman
- Succeeded by: Jeremy Rockliff

Member of the Tasmanian Parliament for Bass
- In office 20 July 2002 – 8 April 2022 Serving with Michael Ferguson, Sarah Courtney, Jennifer Houston and Michelle O'Byrne
- Succeeded by: Simon Wood

Personal details
- Born: 21 December 1964 (age 61) England, United Kingdom
- Party: Liberal (until 2023)
- Education: Deakin University
- Occupation: Financial adviser Hotelier
- Website: www.petergutwein.com.au
Australian rules football career
Personal information
- Original team: East Launceston (TFL)
- Position: Midfielder
Playing career
Years	Club	Games (Goals)
1986	Swan Districts	1 (0)

Peter Carl Gutwein (/ɡʌtwən/, German: [ˈɡuːtvaɪ̯n]; born 21 December 1964) is a former Australian politician who was the 46th premier of Tasmania from 2020 to 2022. He was a Liberal Party member of the Tasmanian House of Assembly from 2002 to 2022, representing the electorate of Bass. He succeeded Will Hodgman as leader of the Liberal Party and Tasmanian Premier on 20 January 2020.

== Early life and career ==
Gutwein was born in England in 1964, the oldest of six children born to a British mother and an Austrian and Yugoslav father who had arrived in Britain from "post-war central Europe" in the mid-1950s. The family migrated to Australia in early 1969 as "Ten Pound Poms", traveling to Launceston, via Melbourne and Hobart. The three youngest children were born in Australia. His father worked as a baker, also stacking animal skins and selling firewood to earn extra money.

Gutwein grew up in the village of Nunamara. He became an Australian citizen at the age of 16. His younger brother died at the age of 10 due to a congenital heart defect. He was educated at Myrtle Park Primary School and Queechy High School in Launceston, and Deakin University in Melbourne.

In a 2022 press conference as premier, Gutwein revealed that he was a victim of child sexual abuse by his teacher at the age of 16.

Gutwein played senior Australian rules football for the East Launceston Football Club as a midfielder. He also played a single season for the Swan Districts Football Club, for a single league game, in the West Australian Football League (WAFL) in 1986, while studying at the Western Australian Institute of Technology.

Holding financial planning qualifications (Diploma of Financial Planning and Graduate Certificate Business Administration) he worked in the insurance and financial planning sector in Australia and in Europe and managed a country pub in Tasmania before entering politics initially as an advisor and then standing for office.

== Political career ==
Gutwein began his career in politics in 1995, when he was introduced to the former federal MP for Bass, Warwick Smith, who convinced him to join the Liberal Party and manage Smith's successful re-election campaign at the 1996 federal election. Following the election of the Howard government, Gutwein worked for two years as a ministerial adviser to Senator Jocelyn Newman during her time as Minister for Social Security.

In July 2002, Gutwein was elected as a member for Bass at the state election. In August 2002, he joined opposition leader Rene Hidding's shadow cabinet, holding the portfolios of shadow treasurer, employment, and economic development. In December 2003, Gutwein became the first Tasmanian MP in five years to cross the floor when he voted for a bill proposed by the Tasmanian Greens to establish a commission of inquiry into child abuse, which saw Hidding strip him of his shadow portfolios. In April 2004 he became shadow minister for education, and police and public safety. When Will Hodgman led the Liberals to government at the 2014 state election, Gutwein was appointed as Treasurer of Tasmania, as well as Minister for Planning and Local Government. Until 2019, he held various other ministries including environment, parks and heritage; forestry; and state growth.

Gutwein took an aggressive stance with the Australian Football League in relation to the granting of a club licence to a Tasmanian-based team but ultimately agreed to a series of concessions that drew significant criticism from the community and independent observers due to the economic costs.

In April 2017, Gutwein was referred to the Legislative Council for contempt of parliament, following his refusal to provide an unredacted version of a report, The Sale of the Tamar Valley Power Station, to the Public Accounts Committee. According to the Tasmanian Parliamentary Library, as of 2017 Gutwein had been suspended from parliament more than any other member, with 16 suspensions.

Gutwein has been described as a moderate Liberal.

=== Premier of Tasmania ===
On 14 January 2020, Hodgman announced his intention to resign as Liberal leader and premier. Along with Michael Ferguson, Gutwein was considered a front-runner for the leadership contest, but was elected unopposed on 20 January, when Ferguson withdrew from the ballot. Gutwein was sworn in as the 46th Premier of Tasmania later that afternoon.

During the COVID-19 pandemic in Australia, Gutwein announced on 19 March 2020 that all "non-essential" travellers to the state, including returning residents, would be subject to a mandatory 14-day quarantine.

In December 2020, Gutwein announced that he would vote in favour of legalising euthanasia in Tasmania, although he had previously voted against similar legislation on three occasions. He stated that "I believe in freedom of choice and that's why I support this bill", also citing the deaths of his father and sister to aggressive forms of cancer.

In March 2021, Gutwein informed Speaker Sue Hickey that she would not be re-endorsed as a Liberal candidate. She subsequently resigned from the party, leaving the Liberals in a minority government. Three days later, Gutwein called an early election for May 2021. He led the Liberals to a third straight majority in the House of Assembly, the first time in the party's history. Ultimately the Liberals finished with 13 seats out of 25, unchanged from the 2018 election, with 48.72% percent of the vote.

On 4 April 2022, Gutwein announced his resignation as premier and as a member of Tasmania's parliament. His deputy Jeremy Rockliff succeeded him on 8 April 2022.

After leaving office, Gutwein allowed his Liberal Party membership to lapse.

== Post-political career ==
In 2022, Gutwein was appointed as Strategic Advisor to Incat shipyard in Hobart. In that function, in 2024 Gutwein walked more than 300 km from Sydney into Prime Minister Anthony Albanese's office in Canberra to highlight the importance of cultural diversity and inclusion in our workplaces and communities.

In July 2026, Gutwein was appointed as chair of the Australian Multicultural Council.

== Personal life ==
Gutwein lives in the Tamar Valley with his wife and two children. He is a qualified black belt and assistant to the instructor in the martial art of taekwondo. He has a pair of pet goats, named Alan and Teddy.

Gutwein was a driving force behind the Scottsdale Football Club's plans to recruit interstate players to become more viable and competitive in a restructured regional Australian Rules competition. While Scottsdale entered the new Northern Tasmanian Football Association premier league division, the planned recruitment struggled and Gutwein resigned from the club to take on the president's role with the Association.

Political offices
Preceded by Lara Giddings	Treasurer of Tasmania; 2014–2022	Succeeded by Michael Ferguson
Preceded by Will Hodgman	Premier of Tasmania; 2020–2022	Succeeded by Jeremy Rockliff
Party political offices
Preceded by Will Hodgman	Leader of the Liberal Party in Tasmania; 2020–2022	Succeeded by Jeremy Rockliff
