= Guy Barnett (Australian politician) =

Australian politician

The Honourable Guy Barnett MP
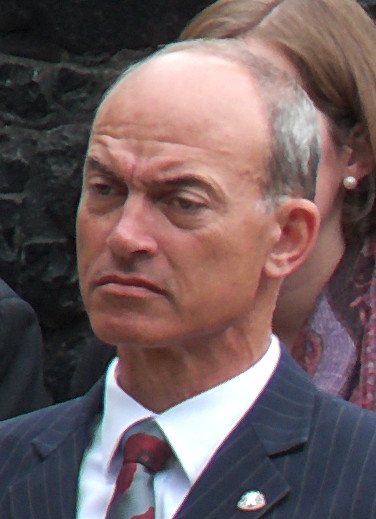

22nd Deputy Premier of Tasmania
- Incumbent
- Assumed office 15 October 2024
- Premier: Jeremy Rockliff
- Preceded by: Michael Ferguson

Attorney-General of Tasmania
- Incumbent
- Assumed office 2 October 2023
- Premier: Jeremy Rockliff
- Preceded by: Elise Archer

Minister for Justice, Corrections and Rehabilitation
- Incumbent
- Assumed office 11 April 2024
- Premier: Jeremy Rockliff
- Preceded by: Position created

Minister for Small Business, Trade and Consumer Affairs
- Incumbent
- Assumed office 7 August 2025
- Premier: Jeremy Rockliff
- Preceded by: Jeremy Rockliff

Member of the Tasmanian House of Assembly for Lyons
- Incumbent
- Assumed office 15 March 2014 Serving with 6 others

Senator for Tasmania
- In office 26 February 2002 – 30 June 2011
- Preceded by: Brian Gibson

Personal details
- Born: 5 April 1962 (age 64) Launceston, Tasmania
- Party: Liberal
- Spouse: Kate
- Children: 3
- Education: Launceston Church Grammar School; Geelong Grammar School; University of Tasmania
- Occupation: Politician
- Profession: Lawyer
- Website: www.guybarnett.com.au

Guy Barnett (born 4 April 1962) is an Australian politician. He is a member of the Liberal Party and was appointed deputy premier of Tasmania in 2024. He has been a member of the Tasmanian House of Assembly since 2014 and has been a state government minister since 2016. He was previously a Senator for Tasmania from 2002 to 2011.

== Early life ==
Barnett was born on 5 April 1962 in Launceston, Tasmania. He is the son of Sallie Sinclair (née Thyne) and John Barnett, a sheep farmer. His father died of motor neurone disease in 1985 and his mother was a founder of the Motor Neurone Disease Association of Tasmania. She later remarried businessman Sir Raymond Ferrall.

Barnett was raised at Quamby Estate, his parents' historic grazing property near Hagley. He attended the Launceston Church Grammar School and Geelong Grammar School. He gained a Bachelor of Laws and later a Master of Laws (Environmental Law) from the University of Tasmania. While at university, he served as president of the University of Tasmania Liberal Club.

Barnett worked as a lawyer after graduating, including in Washington, D.C. as a consultant at Taft Stettinius & Hollister. He was a senior adviser to Tasmanian premier Robin Gray from 1988 to 1989 and was later managing director of Guy Barnett and Associates, a political and public relations consultancy, from 1989 to 2002. He was an accomplished real tennis player, competing in the doubles event of the 1998 Australian Open.

== Federal politics ==
Barnett was appointed to the Senate on 26 February 2002 to fill a casual vacancy caused by the resignation of Brian Gibson. He was elected to a six-year term in his own right at the 2004 federal election.

Barnett was active in various Senate committees and served as chair of the Standing Committee on Publications from 2006 to 2007 and of the Standing Committee on Legal and Constitutional Affairs from 2007 to 2008.

In a November 2008 preselection ballot, Barnett was placed in third position on the Liberal Party's Senate ticket in Tasmania for the next federal election, behind Eric Abetz and Stephen Parry. The result was widely reported as a demotion, given the party had only secured two Senate seats in Tasmania at the previous election. Barnett lost his seat at the 2010 election, with his term expiring on 30 June 2011.

== State politics ==
In the 2014 Tasmanian state election Barnett was elected to the Tasmanian House of Assembly representing the Division of Lyons for the Liberal Party. He was also appointed Parliamentary Secretary to the Premier.

In July 2016, after the resignation of Adam Brooks, he was appointed Minister for Resources and Minister for Building and Construction. He was also made Minister for Energy in 2017 and Minister for Primary Industries and Water in 2018.

Barnett served as Minister for State Development, Construction and Housing under Jeremy Rockliff from April 2022 to July 2023. He was then appointed Minister for Health, serving until April 2024. In October 2023, following a ministerial reshuffle caused by the resignation of Elise Archer, he was additionally appointed Attorney-General of Tasmania, at which point he relinquished the Energy and Renewables portfolio.

Barnett was elected deputy leader of the Tasmanian Liberals in October 2024, following the resignation of Michael Ferguson. He was consequently appointed deputy premier of Tasmania.

Barnett was re-elected at the 2025 Tasmanian state election, he secured the most primary votes and topped the poll in the Electorate of Lyons.

== Policy positions ==
Barnett was a strong advocate for the War in Iraq, justifying the war in a speech to the senate on 20 March 2003.

Barnett is a republican. In 2006, he proposed abolishing the Queen's Birthday public holiday in favour of a "more Australian-oriented holiday" and stated that the Queen's Birthday Honours should instead be awarded on Anzac Day.

In June 2008, Barnett moved a motion in the Senate to end Medicare funding for abortions occurring after the second trimester, stating that there should be "compassion and care for the unborn, we want to show love and concern for them rather than killing them in many cases for psychosocial reasons, which is effectively abortion on request".

Barnett opposed same-sex marriage in the 2017 postal plebiscite.
