= Results of the 2025 Tasmanian state election =

This is a list of House of Assembly results for the 2025 Tasmanian state election.

== Results summary ==
Party	Votes	%	+/–	Seats	+/–
Liberal	139,586	39.87	▲3.20	14	Steady
Labor	90,563	25.87	▼3.13	10	Steady
Greens	50,545	14.44	▲0.55	5	Steady
Shooters, Fishers and Farmers	10,159	2.90	▲0.57	1	▲1
National	5,668	1.62	▲1.62	0	Steady
Independents	53,600	15.31	▲5.69	5	▲2
Total	350,121	100.00	–	35	–
Valid votes	350,121	94.16			
Invalid/blank votes	21,701	5.84	▼0.47		
Total votes	371,822	100.00	–		
Registered voters/turnout	412,905	90.05	▼1.10		
Source: ABC, TEC

Newly-elected MPs
New MP		Division	Predecessor		Ref.
Independent	George Razay	Bass	Independent	Rebekah Pentland (Lambie-turned-independent)	
Liberal	Bridget Archer	Bass	Liberal	Simon Wood	
Labor	Jess Greene	Bass	Labor	Michelle O'Byrne (retired)	
Liberal	Gavin Pearce	Braddon	Nationals	Miriam Beswick (Lambie-turned-independent-turned-National)	
Liberal	Marcus Vermey	Clark	Liberal	Simon Behrakis	
Independent	Peter George	Franklin	Liberal	Nic Street	
SFF	Carlo Di Falco	Lyons	Nationals	Andrew Jenner (Lambie-turned-National)	
Labor	Brian Mitchell	Lyons	Labor	Casey Farrell	

== Results by electoral division ==
=== Bass ===

Vote totals given here are first round vote tallies.

2025 Tasmanian state election: Bass
Party	Candidate	Votes	%	±%
Quota		8,432		
Liberal	Bridget Archer (elected 1)	13,108	19.4	+19.4
Liberal	Michael Ferguson (elected 3)	6,881	10.2	−7.9
Liberal	Rob Fairs (elected 5)	3,717	5.5	−2.9
Liberal	Simon Wood	1,348	2.0	−0.8
Liberal	Julie Sladden	1,747	1.9	−0.7
Liberal	Chris Gatenby	1,504	1.8	−0.4
Liberal	Sarah Quaile	1,448	0.9	−1.2
Labor	Janie Finlay (elected 2)	8,797	13.0	+2.2
Labor	Geoff Lyons	2,339	3.5	+1.0
Labor	Jess Greene (elected 7)	2,256	3.3	+3.3
Labor	Luke Moore	1,499	2.2	+2.2
Labor	Melissa Anderson	852	2.0	+0.7
Labor	William Gordon	1,112	1.9	+0.3
Labor	Peter Thomas	443	1.5	+1.5
Greens	Cecily Rosol (elected 4)	6,566	9.7	+3.4
Greens	Lauren Ball	1,013	1.5	+0.3
Greens	Charlene McLennan	871	1.3	+1.3
Greens	Anne Layton-Bennett	828	1.2	+0.2
Greens	Tom Hall	711	1.1	+0.1
Greens	Eric March	577	0.8	+0.8
Greens	Jack Fittler	542	0.8	+0.2
Shooters, Fishers, Farmers	Michal Frydrych	2,754	4.0	+1.6
Independent	George Razay (elected 6)	2,347	3.5	+1.7
Independent	Rebekah Pentland	1,705	2.5	−1.0
National	Angela Armstrong	684	1.0	−2.0
National	Carl Cooper	683	1.0	+1.0
Independent	Tim Walker	417	0.6	−0.2
Independent	Jack Davenport	405	0.6	+0.2
Independent	Caroline Larner	246	0.4	+0.4
Independent	Fenella Edwards	181	0.3	+0.3
Independent	Daniel Groat	135	0.2	+0.2
Total formal votes		67,450	93.6	+0.1
Informal votes		4,543	6.4	−0.1
Turnout		71,993	89.4	−1.2
Party total votes
Liberal		28,193	41.8	+3.8
Labor		18,564	27.5	−2.3
Greens		11,136	16.5	+4.5
Shooters, Fishers, Farmers		2,754	4.0	+1.6
Independent	George Razay	2,347	3.5	+1.7
Independent	Rebekah Pentland	1,705	2.5	−1.0
National		1,367	2.0	+2.0
Independent	Tim Walker	417	0.6	−0.2
Independent	Jack Davenport	405	0.6	+0.2
Independent	Caroline Larner	246	0.4	+0.4
Independent	Fenella Edwards	181	0.3	+0.3
Independent	Daniel Groat	135	0.2	+0.2
Independent gain from Lambie				

=== Braddon ===

2025 Tasmanian state election: Braddon
Party	Candidate	Votes	%	±%
Quota		8,836		
Liberal	Jeremy Rockliff (elected 1)	22,273	31.5	+3.9
Liberal	Gavin Pearce (elected 2)	5,175	7.3	+7.3
Liberal	Felix Ellis (elected 4)	3,129	4.4	−2.9
Liberal	Roger Jaensch (elected 6)	1,849	2.6	−1.2
Liberal	Giovanna Simpson	1,155	1.6	−1.0
Liberal	Stephen Parry	855	1.2	+1.2
Liberal	Kate Wylie	762	1.1	+1.1
Labor	Anita Dow (elected 5)	5,770	8.2	+0.0
Labor	Shane Broad (elected 7)	4,589	5.9	−0.6
Labor	Kelly 'Hooch' Hunt	1,829	2.6	+2.6
Labor	Amanda Diprose	1,578	2.2	+0.1
Labor	Cheryl Fuller	1,319	2.2	+2.2
Labor	Tara Woodhouse	958	1.4	+1.4
Labor	Adrian Luke	924	1.3	−0.1
Independent	Craig Garland (elected 3)	7,227	10.2	+5.1
Greens	Vanessa Bleyer	1,924	2.7	+2.7
Greens	Erin Morrow	773	1.1	+0.7
Greens	Scott Jordan	411	0.9	+0.9
Greens	Susanne Ward	403	0.8	+0.2
Greens	Petra Wilden	494	0.7	+0.2
Greens	Thomas Kingston	429	0.6	+0.6
Greens	Haru Fergus	392	0.5	+0.5
Shooters, Fishers, Farmers	Adrian Pickin	2,355	3.3	+3.3
Group B Independent	Adam Martin	849	1.2	+1.2
Group B Independent	James Redgrave	195	0.3	−3.7
Group B Independent	Malcolm Ryan	184	0.3	+0.3
Group B Independent	Andrea Courtney	140	0.2	+0.0
Group B Independent	Cristale Harrison	126	0.2	+0.2
Group B Independent	Claudia Baldock	92	0.1	+0.1
National	Miriam Beswick	767	1.1	−3.1
National	Andrew Roberts	357	0.5	+0.5
Independent	Joel Badcock	501	0.7	+0.7
Independent	Matthew Morgan	145	0.2	+0.2
Independent	Jennifer Hamilton	126	0.2	+0.2
Independent	Dami Wells	119	0.2	+0.2
Independent	Gatty Burnett	90	0.1	−0.1
Independent	Ernst Millet	70	0.1	+0.1
Total formal votes		70,686	93.4	+0.2
Informal votes		5,012	6.6	−0.2
Turnout		75,698	89.5	−1.4
Party total votes
Liberal		35,198	49.8	+4.2
Labor		16,763	23.7	−1.0
Independent	Craig Garland	7,277	10.2	+5.1
Greens		5,240	7.4	+0.8
Shooters, Fishers, Farmers		2,355	3.3	+0.4
Group B Independent		1,586	2.2	+2.2
National		1,124	1.6	+1.6
Independent	Joel Badcock	501	0.7	+0.7
Independent	Matthew Morgan	145	0.2	+0.2
Independent	Jennifer Hamilton	126	0.2	+0.2
Independent	Dami Wells	119	0.2	+0.2
Independent	Gatty Burnett	90	0.1	−0.1
Independent	Ernst Millet	70	0.1	+0.1
Liberal gain from Lambie Network				

=== Clark ===

2025 Tasmanian state election: Clark
Party	Candidate	Votes	%	±%
Quota		8,006		
Liberal	Marcus Vermey (elected 6)	5,870	9.2	+3.7
Liberal	Simon Behrakis	5,122	8.0	−0.1
Liberal	Madeleine Ogilvie (elected 7)	4,452	7.0	−0.3
Liberal	Marilena di Florio	1,372	2.1	+2.1
Liberal	Jessica Barnett	1,154	1.8	+1.8
Liberal	Edwin Johnstone	1,007	1.6	+1.6
Liberal	David Wan	647	1.0	+1.0
Labor	Ella Haddad (elected 3)	5,627	8.8	−2.1
Labor	Josh Willie (elected 4)	5,552	8.7	−0.2
Labor	Luke Martin	1,997	3.1	+3.1
Labor	John Kamara	1,826	2.9	+0.2
Labor	Tessa McLaughlin	898	1.4	+1.4
Labor	Liam McLaren	793	1.2	+1.2
Labor	Craig Shirley	605	0.9	+0.9
Greens	Vica Bayley (elected 2)	5,793	9.0	−0.9
Greens	Helen Burnet (elected 5)	4,469	7.0	+1.6
Greens	Janet Shelley	1,250	2.0	+0.3
Greens	Peter Jones	898	1.4	+0.1
Greens	Nathan Volf	657	1.0	0.0
Greens	Angus Templeton	542	0.9	+0.9
Greens	Pat Caruana	518	0.8	+0.8
Independent	Kristie Johnston (elected 1)	9,629	15.0	+7.3
Independent	Elise Archer	2,141	3.3	+3.3
Independent	Steven Phipps	564	0.9	+0.9
Independent	Jags Goldsmith	359	0.6	+0.6
Independent	John MacGowan	300	0.5	+0.5
Total formal votes		64,042	95.4	+0.8
Informal votes		3,115	4.6	−0.8
Turnout		67,157	90.3	−0.3
Party total votes
Liberal		19,624	30.6	+3.5
Labor		17,298	27.0	−3.5
Greens		14,127	22.0	+1.1
Independent	Kristie Johnston	9,629	15.0	+7.3
Independent	Elise Archer	2,141	3.3	+3.3
Independent	Steven Phipps	564	0.9	+0.9
Independent	Jags Goldsmith	359	0.6	+0.6
Independent	John MacGowan	300	0.5	+0.5

=== Franklin ===

2025 Tasmanian state election: Franklin
Party	Candidate	Votes	%	±%
Quota		9,126		
Liberal	Eric Abetz (elected 2)	9,109	12.5	+3.3
Liberal	Jacquie Petrusma (elected 6)	5,835	8.0	−0.5
Liberal	Nic Street	3,719	5.1	−1.6
Liberal	Dean Young	2,241	3.1	−1.2
Liberal	Josh Garvin	1,611	2.2	+0.9
Liberal	Michele Howlett	1,293	1.8	+1.8
Liberal	Natasha Miller	1,282	1.8	+1.8
Labor	Dean Winter (elected 5)	8,241	11.3	+0.1
Labor	Meg Brown (elected 7)	3,196	4.4	+0.6
Labor	Jess Munday	2,169	3.0	+3.0
Labor	Kaspar Deane	1,416	1.9	−0.6
Labor	Amelia Meyers	687	0.9	+0.9
Labor	Chris Hannan	524	0.7	−1.3
Labor	Traycee di Virgilio	396	0.5	+0.5
Group C	Peter George (elected 1)	11,499	15.8	+15.8
Group C	Kirsten Bacon	231	0.3	+0.3
Group C	Andrew Jenner	191	0.3	+0.3
Group C	Anthony Houston	179	0.2	+0.2
Group C	Louise Cherrie	146	0.2	+0.2
Group C	Rayne Allinson	143	0.2	+0.2
Group C	Chrissie Materia	110	0.2	+0.2
Greens	Rosalie Woodruff (elected 3)	7,124	9.8	−3.9
Greens	Owen Fitzgerald	811	1.1	+0.2
Greens	Carly Allen	600	0.8	+0.8
Greens	Gideon Cordover	384	0.5	−0.6
Greens	Brian Chapman	375	0.5	+0.5
Greens	Mark Donnellon	333	0.5	+0.5
Greens	Adi Munshi	257	0.4	+0.4
Independent	David O'Byrne (elected 4)	8,223	11.3	+2.5
Independent	Hans Jurriaan Willink	352	0.5	+0.5
Independent	Sarah Gibbens	330	0.5	+0.5
Total formal votes		73,007	95.2	+0.6
Informal votes		3,738	4.8	−0.6
Turnout		76,745	91.4	−1.0
Party total votes
Liberal		25,090	34.4	+0.4
Labor		16,629	22.8	−4.5
Group C		12,499	17.1	+17.1
Greens		9,884	13.5	−6.3
Independent	David O'Byrne	8,223	11.3	+2.5
Independent	Hans Jurriaan Willink	352	0.5	+0.5
Independent	Sarah Gibbens	330	0.5	+0.5
Independent gain from Liberal				

=== Lyons ===

2025 Tasmanian state election: Lyons
Party	Candidate	Votes	%	±%
Quota		9,257		
Liberal	Guy Barnett (elected 1)	9,975	13.3	+2.2
Liberal	Jane Howlett (elected 2)	9,346	12.5	+3.3
Liberal	Mark Shelton (elected 6)	4,698	6.3	−0.7
Liberal	Stephanie Cameron	2,793	3.7	−0.2
Liberal	Richard Hallett	2,129	2.8	+0.3
Liberal	Poppy Lyne	1,544	2.1	+2.1
Liberal	Bree Groves	996	1.3	+1.3
Labor	Jen Butler (elected 4)	6,445	8.6	+5.4
Labor	Brian Mitchell (elected 5)	5,400	7.2	+7.2
Labor	Richard Goss	2,674	3.6	+1.2
Labor	Casey Farrell	2,640	3.5	+1.9
Labor	Sharon Campbell	1,732	2.3	+2.3
Labor	Edwin Batt	1,428	1.9	+0.5
Labor	Saxon O'Donnell	990	1.3	+1.3
Greens	Tabatha Badger (elected 3)	5,507	7.3	+1.8
Greens	Hannah Rubenach-Quinn	1,053	1.4	−0.1
Greens	Alistair Allan	932	1.2	+0.4
Greens	Isabel Shapcott	813	1.1	+1.1
Greens	Craig Brown	776	1.0	+0.0
Greens	Mitch Houghton	563	0.8	+0.1
Greens	Joey Cavanagh	514	0.7	+0.7
Shooters, Fishers, Farmers	Carlo Di Falco (elected 7)	5,050	6.7	+5.9
National	John Tucker	1,608	2.1	−1.0
National	Andrew Jenner	833	1.1	−1.8
National	Lesley Pyecroft	273	0.4	−2.1
National	Rick Mandelson	1,841	0.4	+0.4
National	Francis Haddon-Cave	200	0.3	+0.3
Independent	Angela Offord	941	1.3	+1.0
Independent	Michelle Dracoulis	845	1.1	+1.1
Independent	Jiri Lev	498	0.7	+0.7
Independent	John Hawkins	475	0.6	+0.6
Independent	Phillip Bigg	364	0.5	−0.5
Independent	Ray Broomhall	256	0.3	+0.3
Independent	Tenille Murtagh	193	0.3	+0.3
Independent	Paul Dare	189	0.3	+0.3
Total formal votes		74,936	63.4	+1.0
Informal votes		5,293	6.6	−1.0
Turnout		80,229	89.7	−1.3
Party total votes
Liberal		31,481	42.0	+4.4
Labor		21,309	28.4	−4.3
Greens		10,158	13.6	+2.7
Shooters, Fishers, Farmers		5,050	6.7	+2.0
National		3,177	4.2	+4.2
Independent	Angela Offord	941	1.3	+1.0
Independent	Michelle Dracoulis	845	1.1	+1.1
Independent	Jiri Lev	498	0.7	+0.7
Independent	John Hawkins	475	0.6	+0.6
Independent	Phillip Bigg	364	0.5	−0.5
Independent	Ray Broomhall	256	0.3	+0.3
Independent	Tenille Murtagh	193	0.3	+0.3
Independent	Paul Dare	189	0.3	+0.3
Shooters gain from Lambie Network				
