= Candidates of the 2025 Tasmanian state election =

Candidates for the 2025 Tasmanian state election can be found below.

Sitting members are shown in bold text. Successful candidates as of 1 August 2025 are indicated by an asterisk (*).

== Retiring MPs ==
=== Labor ===
- Michelle O'Byrne (Bass) – announced retirement 10 June 2025

== House of Assembly ==
=== Bass ===
Greens candidates	National candidates	Labor candidates	Liberal candidates	Group E candidates	SFF candidates
**Cecily Rosol***; Charlene McLennan; Jack Fittler; Lauren Ball; Tom Hall; Anne Layton-Bennett; Eric March	Angela Armstrong; Carl Cooper	**Janie Finlay***; Geoff Lyons; Jess Greene*; Luke Moore; Melissa Anderson; Peter Thomas; Will Gordon	**Michael Ferguson***; **Simon Wood**; **Rob Fairs***; Bridget Archer*; Chris Gatenby; Sarah Quaile; Julie Sladden	George Razay*	Michal Frydrych
Ungrouped candidates
Jack Davenport; Fenella Edwards; Daniel Groat	Caroline Larner; **Rebekah Pentland**; Tim Walker				

=== Braddon ===
Greens candidates	Group B candidates	Group C candidates	Group D candidates	Labor candidates	Liberal candidates
Vanessa Bleyer; Scott Jordan; Erin Morrow; Petra Wilden; Susanne Ward; Thomas Kingston; Haru Fergus	Claudia Baldock; Andrea Courtney; Cristale Harrison; Adam Martin; James Redgrave; Malcolm Ryan	Joel Badcock	**Craig Garland***	**Anita Dow***; **Shane Broad***; Adrian Luke; Amanda Diprose; Cheryl Fuller; Kelly "Hooch" Hunt; Tara Woodhouse	**Felix Ellis***; **Roger Jaensch***; **Jeremy Rockliff***; Gavin Pearce*; Giovanna Simpson; Stephen Parry; Kate Wylie
National candidates	SFF candidates	Ungrouped candidates			
**Miriam Beswick**; Andrew Roberts	Adrian Pickin	Dami Barnes; Gatty Burnett; Jennifer Hamilton	Ernst Millet; Matthew Morgan; Melissa Jane Wells		

=== Clark ===
Labor candidates	Greens candidates	Group C candidates	Group D candidates	Liberal candidates	Ungrouped candidates
**Ella Haddad***; **Josh Willie***; Craig Shirley; John Kamara; Liam McLaren; Luke Martin; Tessa McLaughlin	**Vica Bayley***; **Helen Burnet***; Janet Shelley; Nathan Volf; Pat Caruana; Angus Templeton; Peter Jones	**Kristie Johnston***	Elise Archer	**Simon Behrakis**; **Madeleine Ogilvie***; Marcus Vermey*; Marilena Di Florio; David Wan; Edwin Johnstone; Jess Barnett	Jags Goldsmith; John Macgowan; Steven Phipps

=== Franklin ===
Labor candidates	Group B candidates	Group C candidates	Liberal candidates	Greens candidates	Ungrouped candidates
**Dean Winter***; **Meg Brown***; Amelia Meyers; Chris Hannan; Jess Munday; Kaspar Deane; Traycee Di Virgilio	**David O'Byrne***	Rayne Allinson; Kirsten Bacon; Louise Cherrie; Peter George*; Anthony Houston; Andrew Jenner; Chrissie Materia	**Nic Street**; **Jacquie Petrusma***; **Eric Abetz***; Dean Young; Natasha Miller; Michele Howlett; Josh Garvin	**Rosalie Woodruff***; Owen Fitzgerald; Gideon Cordover; Carly Allen; Adi Munshi; Mark Donnellon; Brian Chapman	Sarah Gibbens; Hans Jurriaan Willink

=== Lyons ===
SFF candidates	National candidates	Greens candidates	Group D candidates	Labor candidates	Liberal candidates
Carlo Di Falco*	**Andrew Jenner**; John Tucker; Francis Haddon-Cave; Rick Mandelson; Lesley Pyecroft	**Tabatha Badger***; Alistair Allan; Hannah Rubenach-Quinn; Isabell Shapcott; Mitch Houghton; Craig Brown; Joey Cavanagh	Angela Offord	**Casey Farrell**; **Jen Butler***; Brian Mitchell*; Edwin Batt; Richard Goss; Saxon O'Donnell; Shannon Campbell	**Guy Barnett***; **Mark Shelton***; **Jane Howlett***; Stephanie Cameron; Bree Groves; Richard Hallett; Poppy Lyne
Ungrouped candidates
Phillip Bigg; Ray Broomhall; Paul Dare; Michelle Dracoulis	John Hawkins; Jiri Lev; Tennille Murtagh				
