= Results of the 2024 Tasmanian state election =

This is a list of House of Assembly results for the 2024 Tasmanian state election.

== Results summary ==
Party	Votes	%	+/–	Seats	+/–
Liberal	127,837	36.67	▼12.05	14	▲1
Labor	101,113	29.00	▲0.80	10	▲1
Greens	48,430	13.89	▲1.51	5	▲3
Lambie Network	23,260	6.67	▲6.67	3	▲3
Shooters, Fishers and Farmers	8,126	2.33	▼0.71	0	Steady
Animal Justice	5,283	1.52	▲0.11	0	Steady
Local Network	1,028	0.29	▲0.29	0	Steady
Independents	33,535	9.62	▲3.40	3	▲2
Total	348,612	100.00	–	35	▲10
Valid votes	348,612	93.69			
Invalid/blank votes	23,465	6.31	▲1.18		
Total votes	372,077	100.00	–		
Registered voters/turnout	408,197	91.15	▼0.07		
Source: TEC, ABC

=== New MPs ===
The Expansion of House of Assembly Act 2022 enabled the change of total seats in the lower house from 25 seats to 35 seats. This has resulted in thirteen new MPs being elected (ten to the new seats, and three replacing Lara Alexander, John Tucker and Dean Young who were defeated at the election).

Name	Party	Seat	Notes
Eric Abetz	Liberal	Franklin	Former Senator for Tasmania
Jacquie Petrusma	Liberal	Franklin	Former MHA for Franklin
Jane Howlett	Liberal	Lyons	Former MLC for Prosser
Rob Fairs	Liberal	Bass	Radio broadcaster and non-profit executive
Meg Brown	Labor	Franklin	Electorate officer
Josh Willie	Labor	Clark	Former MLC for Elwick
Tabatha Badger	Greens	Lyons	Environmental activist
Cecily Rosol	Greens	Bass	Counsellor/nurse
Helen Burnet	Greens	Clark	Deputy Lord Mayor of Hobart City Council
Rebekah Pentland	Lambie	Bass	Pharmaceutical consultant
Andrew Jenner	Lambie	Lyons	Former mayor of the RBWM
Miriam Beswick	Lambie	Braddon	Small business owner/carer
Craig Garland	Independent	Braddon	Fisherman

== Results by electoral division ==
=== Bass ===
Vote totals given here are first round vote tallies.

2024 Tasmanian state election: Bass
Party	Candidate	Votes	%	±%
Quota		8,491		
Liberal	Michael Ferguson (elected 1)	12,294	18.1	+12.4
Liberal	Rob Fairs (elected 4)	5,727	8.4	+8.4
Liberal	Simon Wood (elected 7)	1,949	2.9	+1.8
Liberal	Julie Sladden	1,747	2.6	+2.6
Liberal	Chris Gatenby	1,504	2.2	+2.2
Liberal	Sarah Quaile	1,448	2.1	+2.1
Liberal	Richard Trethewie	1,148	1.7	+1.7
Labor	Michelle O'Byrne (elected 2)	8,073	11.9	+0.3
Labor	Janie Finlay (elected 3)	7,337	10.8	+2.1
Labor	Geoff Lyons	1,698	2.5	+2.5
Labor	William Gordon	1,112	1.6	+1.6
Labor	Melissa Anderson	852	1.3	+1.3
Labor	Adrian Hinds	735	1.1	−1.4
Labor	Roshan Dhingra	443	0.7	+0.7
Greens	Cecily Rosol (elected 5)	4,283	6.3	+5.3
Greens	Lauren Ball	838	1.2	+1.2
Greens	Carol Barnett	787	1.2	+1.2
Greens	Tom Hall	711	1.0	−0.3
Greens	Anne Layton-Bennett	665	1.0	−0.6
Greens	Jack Fittler	441	0.6	+0.6
Greens	Calum Hendry	431	0.6	+0.6
Lambie	Rebekah Pentland (elected 6)	2,409	3.5	+3.5
Lambie	Angela Armstrong	2,033	3.0	+3.0
Lambie	Ludwig Johnson	1,088	1.6	+1.6
Shooters, Fishers, Farmers	Michal Frydrych	1,616	2.4	+2.4
Independent	Lara Alexander	1,518	2.2	+1.5
Independent	Greg (Tubby) Quinn	1,513	2.2	+2.2
Independent	George Razay	1,247	1.8	+1.8
Animal Justice	Ivan Davis	994	1.5	+1.5
Independent	Tim Walker	571	0.8	+0.8
Independent	Mark Brown	436	0.6	+0.6
Independent	Jack Davenport	278	0.4	−4.0
Total formal votes		67,926	93.5	−1.5
Informal votes		4,706	6.5	+1.5
Turnout		72,632	90.6	−0.0
Party total votes
Liberal		25,817	38.0	−21.9
Labor		20,250	29.8	+3.8
Greens		8,156	12.0	+2.8
Lambie		5,530	8.1	+8.1
Shooters, Fishers, Farmers		1,616	2.4	–0.1
Independent	Lara Alexander	1,518	2.2	+1.5
Independent	Greg (Tubby) Quinn	1,513	2.2	+2.2
Independent	George Razay	1,247	1.8	+1.8
Animal Justice		994	1.8	–0.4
Independent	Tim Walker	571	0.8	+0.8
Independent	Mark Brown	436	0.6	+0.6
Independent	Jack Davenport	278	0.4	–4.0

=== Braddon ===
2024 Tasmanian state election: Braddon
Party	Candidate	Votes	%	±%
Quota		8,875		
Liberal	Jeremy Rockliff (elected 1)	19,573	27.6	+0.1
Liberal	Felix Ellis (elected 2)	5,163	7.3	−1.6
Liberal	Roger Jaensch (elected 4)	2,704	3.8	−3.1
Liberal	Giovanna Simpson	1,852	2.6	+2.6
Liberal	Vonette Mead	1,467	2.1	+2.1
Liberal	Patrick Fabian	858	1.2	+1.2
Liberal	Sarina Laidler	787	1.1	+1.1
Labor	Anita Dow (elected 3)	5,816	8.2	+0.1
Labor	Shane Broad (elected 5)	4,589	6.5	−2.2
Labor	Chris Lynch	2,319	3.3	+3.3
Labor	Amanda Diprose	1,504	2.1	+0.2
Labor	Samantha Facey	1,319	1.9	+1.9
Labor	Adrian Luke	1,017	1.4	+1.4
Labor	Danielle Kidd	969	1.4	+1.4
Lambie	Miriam Beswick (elected 6)	2,951	4.2	+4.2
Lambie	James Redgrave	2,776	3.9	+3.9
Lambie	Craig Cutts	2,352	3.3	+3.3
Greens	Darren Briggs	2,493	3.5	+0.9
Greens	Sarah Kersey	411	0.6	+0.6
Greens	Susanne Ward	403	0.6	+0.6
Greens	Leeya Lovell	364	0.5	+0.5
Greens	Petra Wilden	359	0.5	+0.5
Greens	Michael McLoughlin	357	0.5	+0.5
Greens	Erin Morrow	314	0.4	+0.4
Independent	Craig Garland (elected 7)	3,638	5.1	−0.9
Shooters, Fishers, Farmers	Dale Marshall	890	1.3	+1.3
Shooters, Fishers, Farmers	Brenton Jones	706	1.0	−1.4
Shooters, Fishers, Farmers	Kim Swanson	452	0.6	−0.8
Independent	Peter Freshney	1,281	1.8	+1.8
Animal Justice	Julia M King	866	1.2	+1.2
Independent	Andrea Courtney	168	0.2	+0.2
Independent	Liz Hamer	149	0.2	−0.3
Independent	Gatty Burnett	127	0.2	+0.2
Total formal votes		70,994	93.2	−1.5
Informal votes		5,220	6.8	+1.5
Turnout		76,214	90.9	−0.2
Party total votes
Liberal		32,404	45.6	−11.6
Labor		17,533	24.7	−1.8
Lambie		8,079	11.4	+11.4
Greens		4,701	6.6	+1.1
Independent	Craig Garland	3,638	5.1	–0.9
Shooters, Fishers, Farmers		2,048	2.9	–0.9
Independent	Peter Freshney	1,281	1.8	+1.8
Animal Justice		866	1.2	+1.2
Independent	Andrea Courtney	168	0.2	+0.2
Independent	Liz Hamer	149	0.2	–0.3
Independent	Gatty Burnett	127	0.2	+0.2

=== Clark ===
2024 Tasmanian state election: Clark
Party	Candidate	Votes	%	±%
Quota		7,951		
Labor	Ella Haddad (elected 1)	6,944	10.9	−1.6
Labor	Josh Willie (elected 3)	5,670	8.9	+8.9
Labor	Stuart Benson	1,929	3.0	+3.0
Labor	John Kamara	1,689	2.7	+2.7
Labor	Rebecca Prince	1,441	2.3	+2.3
Labor	Simon Davis	852	1.3	−1.8
Labor	Susan Wallace	850	1.3	+1.3
Liberal	Simon Behrakis (elected 6)	5,168	8.1	+2.3
Liberal	Madeleine Ogilvie (elected 7)	4,623	7.3	+1.0
Liberal	Marcus Vermey	3,513	5.5	+5.5
Liberal	Jon Gourlay	1,434	2.3	+2.3
Liberal	Mohammad Aldergham	878	1.4	+1.4
Liberal	Catherine Searle	828	1.3	+1.3
Liberal	Emma Atterbury	800	1.3	+1.3
Greens	Vica Bayley (elected 2)	6,313	9.9	+7.8
Greens	Helen Burnet (elected 5)	3,422	5.4	+5.4
Greens	Janet Shelley	1,076	1.7	+1.7
Greens	Peter Jones	821	1.3	+1.3
Greens	Nathan Volf	629	1.0	+0.3
Greens	Trenton Hoare	545	0.9	+0.9
Greens	James Zalotockyj	459	0.7	+0.7
Independent	Kristie Johnston (elected 4)	4,925	7.7	−3.2
Independent	Sue Hickey	3,117	4.9	−4.9
Independent	Ben Lohberger	1,702	2.7	+2.7
Independent	Louise Elliot	1,160	1.8	+1.8
Animal Justice	Casey Davies	1,088	1.7	+1.7
Shooters, Fishers, Farmers	Adrian Pickin	521	0.8	+0.8
Shooters, Fishers, Farmers	Lorraine Bennett	408	0.6	+0.2
Local Network	David Nunn	147	0.2	+0.2
Local Network	Frank Formby	129	0.2	+0.2
Local Network	Sam Campbell	112	0.2	+0.2
Local Network	Ranae Zollner	88	0.1	+0.1
Independent	Stefan Vogel	162	0.3	+0.3
Independent	Angela Triffitt	90	0.1	+0.1
Independent	John Michael Forster	70	0.1	+0.1
Total formal votes		63,603	94.6	−0.4
Informal votes		3,655	5.4	+0.4
Turnout		67,258	90.6	−0.1
Party total votes
Labor		19,375	30.5	+8.4
Liberal		17,244	27.1	−4.7
Greens		13,265	20.9	+0.8
Independent	Kristie Johnston	4,925	7.7	−3.2
Independent	Sue Hickey	3,117	4.9	−4.9
Independent	Ben Lohberger	1,702	2.7	+2.7
Independent	Louise Elliot	1,160	1.8	+1.8
Animal Justice		1,088	1.7	+1.7
Shooters, Fishers, Farmers		929	1.5	+0.1
Local Network		476	0.7	+0.7
Independent	Stefan Vogel	162	0.3	+0.3
Independent	Angela Triffitt	90	0.1	+0.1
Independent	John Michael Forster	70	0.1	+0.1

=== Franklin ===
2024 Tasmanian state election: Franklin
Party	Candidate	Votes	%	±%
Quota		9,006		
Liberal	Eric Abetz (elected 6)	6,661	9.2	+9.2
Liberal	Jacquie Petrusma (elected 3)	6,093	8.5	−12.6
Liberal	Nic Street (elected 7)	4,811	6.7	−1.7
Liberal	Dean Young	3,078	4.3	−0.3
Liberal	Jock McGregor	1,463	2.0	+2.0
Liberal	Aldo Antolli	1,449	2.0	+2.0
Liberal	Josh Garvin	972	1.3	+1.3
Labor	Dean Winter (elected 2)	8,055	11.2	−0.2
Labor	Meg Brown (elected 4)	3,613	5.0	+5.0
Labor	Toby Thorpe	2,908	4.0	+1.5
Labor	Kaspar Deane	1,808	2.5	+2.5
Labor	Ebony Altimira	1,736	2.4	+2.4
Labor	Simon Bailey	946	1.3	+1.3
Labor	Philip Pregnell	613	0.9	+0.9
Greens	Rosalie Woodruff (elected 1)	9,879	13.7	−1.0
Greens	Jade Darko	1,008	1.4	+1.4
Greens	Christine Campbell	810	1.1	+1.1
Greens	Gideon Cordover	776	1.1	+0.2
Greens	Jenny Cambers-Smith	762	1.1	+1.1
Greens	Owen Fitzgerald	614	0.9	+0.9
Greens	Lukas Mrosek	412	0.6	+0.6
Independent	David O'Byrne (elected 5)	6,312	8.8	−2.1
Lambie	Chris Hannan	1,418	2.0	+2.0
Lambie	Marshall Callaghan	1,063	1.5	+1.5
Lambie	Conor Hallahan	1,025	1.4	+1.4
Independent	Clare Glade-Wright	1,154	1.6	+1.6
Animal Justice	Jehni Thomas-Wurth	1,122	1.6	+1.6
Independent	Tony Mulder	597	0.8	+0.8
Local Network	Martine Delaney	552	0.8	+0.8
Independent	Bob Elliston	186	0.3	+0.3
Independent	Tamar Cordover	144	0.2	+0.2
Total formal votes		72,040	94.6	−1.2
Informal votes		4,115	5.4	+1.2
Turnout		76,155	92.4	+0.1
Party total votes
Liberal		24,527	34.0	−8.2
Labor		19,679	27.3	−5.9
Greens		14,261	19.8	+0.8
Independent	David O'Byrne	6,312	8.8	−2.1
Lambie		3,506	4.9	+4.9
Independent	Clare Glade-Wright	1,154	1.6	+1.6
Animal Justice		1,122	1.6	−0.2
Independent	Tony Mulder	597	0.8	+0.8
Local Network		552	0.8	+0.8
Independent	Bob Elliston	186	0.4	+0.4
Independent	Tamar Cordover	144	0.2	+0.2

=== Lyons ===
2024 Tasmanian state election: Lyons
Party	Candidate	Votes	%	±%
Quota		9,257		
Liberal	Guy Barnett (elected 2)	8,252	11.1	−9.7
Liberal	Jane Howlett (elected 3)	6,843	9.2	+9.2
Liberal	Mark Shelton (elected 5)	5,184	7.0	−5.1
Liberal	Stephanie Cameron	2,865	3.9	−0.6
Liberal	Richard Hallett	1,867	2.5	+2.5
Liberal	Justin Derksen	1,483	2.0	+2.0
Liberal	Gregory Brown	1,353	1.8	+1.8
Labor	Rebecca White (elected 1)	15,607	21.1	−1.9
Labor	Jen Butler (elected 4)	2,363	3.2	−0.5
Labor	Richard Goss	1,790	2.4	+2.4
Labor	Ben Dudman	1,491	2.0	+2.0
Labor	Casey Farrell	1,182	1.6	+1.6
Labor	Edwin Batt	1,063	1.4	−0.2
Labor	Carole McQueeney	780	1.1	+1.1
Greens	Tabatha Badger (elected 7)	4,044	5.5	+5.5
Greens	Hannah Rubenach-Quinn	1,117	1.5	+1.5
Greens	Craig Brown	741	1.0	+1.0
Greens	Alistair Allan	620	0.8	+0.8
Greens	Glenn Millar	520	0.7	−0.0
Greens	Mitch Houghton	516	0.7	+0.7
Greens	Gary Whisson	489	0.7	+0.7
Lambie	Andrew Jenner (elected 6)	2,177	2.9	+2.9
Lambie	Troy Pfitzner	2,127	2.9	+2.9
Lambie	Lesley Pyecroft	1,841	2.5	+2.5
Shooters, Fishers, Farmers	Ray Williams	953	1.3	+1.3
Shooters, Fishers, Farmers	Shane Broadby	755	1.0	+1.0
Shooters, Fishers, Farmers	Phillip Bigg	715	1.0	+1.0
Shooters, Fishers, Farmers	Carlo Di Falco	599	0.8	−3.7
Shooters, Fishers, Farmers	Wayne Turale	511	0.7	+0.7
Independent	John Tucker	2,309	3.1	−3.4
Animal Justice	Anna Megan Gralton	1,213	1.6	+1.6
Independent	Angela Offord	214	0.3	+0.3
Independent	Loueen (Lou) Triffitt	175	0.2	+0.2
Independent	Andrew Roberts	130	0.2	+0.2
Independent	Jenny Branch-Allen	92	0.1	+0.1
Independent	Fraser Miller	70	0.1	+0.1
Total formal votes		74,051	92.8	−1.2
Informal votes		5,769	7.2	+1.2
Turnout		79,820	91.0	−0.1
Party total votes
Liberal		27,847	37.6	−13.6
Labor		24,276	32.8	+0.2
Greens		8,047	10.9	+2.0
Lambie		6,145	8.3	+8.3
Shooters, Fishers, Farmers		3,533	4.8	+0.3
Independent	John Tucker	2,309	3.1	−3.4
Animal Justice		1,213	1.6	+1.6
Independent	Angela Offord	214	0.3	+0.3
Independent	Loueen (Lou) Triffitt	175	0.2	+0.2
Independent	Andrew Roberts	130	0.2	+0.2
Independent	Jenny Branch-Allen	92	0.1	+0.1
Independent	Fraser Miller	70	0.1	+0.1

== See also ==
- 2024 Tasmanian state election
- Candidates of the 2024 Tasmanian state election
- Members of the Tasmanian House of Assembly, 2024–2028
