= Members of the Tasmanian House of Assembly, 2024–2025 =

List of Tasmanian House Assembly elected in the 2021 election

This is a list of members of the Tasmanian House of Assembly, elected at the 2024 state election.

Name	Party	Electorate	Years in office
Hon Eric Abetz	Liberal	Franklin	2024–present
Tabatha Badger	Greens	Lyons	2024–present
Hon Guy Barnett	Liberal	Lyons	2014–present
Vica Bayley	Greens	Clark	2023–present
Simon Behrakis	Liberal	Clark	2023–2025
Miriam Beswick^{1} ^{4}	Lambie/Independent/National	Braddon	2024–2025
Dr Shane Broad	Labor	Braddon	2017–present
Meg Brown	Labor	Franklin	2024–present
Helen Burnet	Greens	Clark	2024–present
Jen Butler	Labor	Lyons	2018–present
Anita Dow	Labor	Braddon	2018–present
Hon Felix Ellis	Liberal	Braddon	2020–2021, 2021–present
Rob Fairs	Liberal	Bass	2024–present
Casey Farrell^{2}	Labor	Lyons	2025
Hon Michael Ferguson	Liberal	Bass	2010–present
Janie Finlay	Labor	Bass	2021–present
Craig Garland	Independent	Braddon	2024–present
Ella Haddad	Labor	Clark	2018–present
Hon Jane Howlett	Liberal	Lyons	2024–present
Hon Roger Jaensch	Liberal	Braddon	2014–present
Andrew Jenner^{3}	Lambie/National	Lyons	2024–2025
Kristie Johnston	Independent	Clark	2021–present
David O'Byrne	Independent	Franklin	2010–2014, 2018–present
Michelle O'Byrne	Labor	Bass	2006–2025
Hon Madeleine Ogilvie	Liberal	Clark	2014–2018, 2019–present
Rebekah Pentland^{1}	Lambie/Independent	Bass	2024–2025
Hon Jacquie Petrusma	Liberal	Franklin	2010–2022, 2024–present
Hon Jeremy Rockliff	Liberal	Braddon	2002–present
Cecily Rosol	Greens	Bass	2024–present
Mark Shelton	Liberal	Lyons	2010–present
Hon Nic Street	Liberal	Franklin	2016–2018, 2020–2025
Rebecca White^{2}	Labor	Lyons	2010–2025
Josh Willie	Labor	Clark	2024–present
Hon Dean Winter	Labor	Franklin	2021–present
Simon Wood	Liberal	Bass	2022–2025
Dr Rosalie Woodruff	Greens	Franklin	2015–present

^{1} Braddon MHA Miriam Beswick and Bass MHA Rebekah Pentland were expelled from the Jacqui Lambie Network on 24 August 2024, and sat as independents.
^{2} Lyons MHA Rebecca White resigned on 12 February 2025. She was replaced on a recount by Casey Farrell.
^{3} Lyons MHA Andrew Jenner joined the National Party on 14 June 2025 after the snap election was called as the Jacqui Lambie Network had previously announced that it was no longer endorsing candidates in the following state election in August 2024.
^{4} Independent Braddon MHA Miriam Beswick joined the National Party on 16 June 2025 after the snap election was called.

== Distribution of seats ==
Electorate	Seats won
Bass	
Braddon	
Clark	
Franklin	
Lyons	

Liberal
Labor
Greens
Lambie
Independent

== See also ==
- List of past members of the Tasmanian House of Assembly
