= Opinion polling for the 2025 Tasmanian state election =

In the lead-up to the 2025 Tasmanian state election, a number of polling companies conducted opinion polls. These polls collect data on parties' primary vote, leaders' favourability, and individual electoral division results.

== Graphical summary ==
Local regression of primary vote opinion polling for the 2025 Tasmanian state election

== Voting intention ==
Date	Firm	Sample size	Margin of error	Primary vote								2PP vote (Note: While Tasmania's Hare–Clark electoral system does use semi-optional preferential voting, a two-party-preferred count is generally not provided as the House of Assembly electorates are multi-member, not single-member.)	
Date	Firm	Sample size	Margin of error	LIB	ALP	GRN	NAT	SFF	JLN	IND	OTH	LIB	ALP
20 Jul 2025	2025 election			39.9%	25.9%	14.4%	1.6%	2.9%	—	15.3%	—	—	
7–18 Jul 2025	YouGov	931	±3.2%	31%	30%	16%	2%	1%	—N/a	20%	—N/a	45%	55%
Mid-Jul 2025	EMRS (Note: Commissioned by the Liberal Party.)	500		37%	26%	14%	—N/a	—N/a	—N/a	19%	—N/a	—N/a	
6–10 Jul 2025	DemosAU	3,421	±2.1%	34.9%	24.7%	15.6%	2.7%	1.8%	—N/a	20.3%	—N/a	—N/a	
6–8 Jul 2025	EMRS	518		37%	26%	15%	3%	—N/a	—N/a	18%	0%	—N/a	
29 Jun–1 Jul 2025	EMRS	550		34.5%	28.2%	13.9%	2.1%	—N/a	—N/a	17.8%	3.5%	—N/a	
19–26 Jun 2025	DemosAU	4,289		34.0%	27.3%	15.1%	2.3%	3.0%	—N/a	19.3%	—N/a	—N/a	
12–24 Jun 2025	YouGov	1,287	±3.4%	31%	34%	13%	—N/a	—N/a	—N/a	18%	4%	—N/a	
15–17 Jun 2025	EMRS	550		32.3%	28.7%	14%	1.8%	—N/a	—N/a	19.2%	3.9%	—N/a	
11 Jun 2025	The 2025 Tasmanian state election is called for 19 July												
5 Jun 2025	No-confidence motion against Premier Jeremy Rockliff passes												
13–17 May 2025	EMRS	1,000	±3.1%	29%	31%	14%	—N/a	—N/a	6%	—N/a	17%	—N/a	
11–18 Feb 2025	EMRS	1,000	±3.1%	34%	30%	13%	—N/a	—N/a	8%	—N/a	12%	—N/a	
5–14 Nov 2024	EMRS	1,000	±3.1%	35%	31%	14%	—N/a	—N/a	6%	—N/a	14%	—N/a	
2–11 Oct 2024	EMRS	500		28%	26%	17%	—N/a	—N/a	5%	—N/a	1% (Note: 8% unsure/prefer not to say)	—N/a	
29 Aug 2024	Jacqui Lambie Network announces it won't run candidates in next state election												
14–21 Aug 2024	EMRS	1,000		36%	27%	14%	—N/a	—N/a	8%	—N/a	15%	—N/a	
6–29 Aug 2024	Wolf & Smith	786	±3.5%	32%	23%	14%	—N/a	—N/a	11%	—N/a	20%	—N/a	
16–23 May 2024	EMRS	1,000		35%	28%	15%	—N/a	—N/a	7%	—N/a	15%	—N/a	
23 March 2024	2024 election			36.7%	29.0%	13.9%	—	2.3%	6.7%	9.6%	1.8%	—	

== Bass ==
=== Voting intention ===
Date	Firm	Sample size	Margin of error	Primary vote							
Date	Firm	Sample size	Margin of error	LIB	ALP	GRN	NAT	SFF	JLN	IND	OTH
6–10 Jul 2025	DemosAU	723	±4.5%	37.6%	26.0%	20.0%	3.5%	0.5%	—N/a	12.4%	—N/a
19–26 Jun 2025	DemosAU			33.5%	27.5%	18.8%	5.1%	4.0%	—N/a	11.1%	—N/a
12–24 Jun 2025	YouGov	253	±6%	36%	34%	12%	—N/a	—N/a	—N/a	15%	2%
21 May 2024	2024 election			38.0%	29.8%	12.0%	—	2.4%	8.1%	8.2%	1.8%

=== Liberal candidates ===
Date	Firm	Liberal candidates							
Date	Firm	Archer	Fairs	Ferguson	Gatenby	Quaile	Sladden	Wood	OTH
6–10 Jul 2025	DemosAU	19.6%	4.1%	7.5%	1.8%	1.0%	1.5%	2.2%	—N/a
21 May 2024	2024 election	—	8.4%	18.1%	2.2%	2.1%	2.6%	2.4%	1.7%

=== Labor candidates ===
Date	Firm	Labor candidates							
Date	Firm	Anderson	Finlay	Gordon	Greene	Lyons	Moore	Thomas	OTH
6–10 Jul 2025	DemosAU	2.1%	9.4%	1.5%	5.1%	3.5%	2.7%	1.7%	—N/a
21 May 2024	2024 election	1.3%	10.8%	1.6%	2.5	2.5%	—	—	13.7%

=== Independent candidates ===
Date	Firm	Independent candidates		
Date	Firm	Razay	Pentland	Other independents
6–10 Jul 2025	DemosAU	5.1%	4.3%	3.0%
21 May 2024	2024 election	1.8%	3.5% (Note: As a Jacqui Lambie Network candidate.)	6.2%

== Braddon ==
=== Voting intention ===
Date	Firm	Sample size	Margin of error	Primary vote							
Date	Firm	Sample size	Margin of error	LIB	ALP	GRN	NAT	SFF	JLN	IND	OTH
6–10 Jul 2025	DemosAU	623	±4.7%	40.8%	23.5%	9.5%	3.2%	1.8%	—N/a	21.2%	—N/a
6–8 Jul 2025	EMRS			44%	24%	10%	—N/a	—N/a	—N/a	—N/a	—N/a
19–26 Jun 2025	DemosAU			44.0%	25.2%	9.3%	2.6%	3.3%	—N/a	15.6%	—N/a
12–24 Jun 2025	YouGov	250	±6%	35%	34%	5%	—N/a	—N/a	—N/a	19%	7%
21 May 2024	2024 election			45.6%	24.7%	6.6%	—	2.9%	11.4%	7.5%	1.2%

=== Liberal candidates ===
Date	Firm	Liberal candidates							
Date	Firm	Ellis	Jaensch	Parry	Pearce	Rockliff	Simpson	Wylie	OTH
6–10 Jul 2025	DemosAU	5.4%	2.4%	0.9%	5.8%	24.6%	1.0%	0.6%	—N/a
21 May 2024	2024 election	7.3%	3.8%	—	—	27.6%	2.6%	—	2.3%

=== Labor candidates ===
Date	Firm	Labor candidates							
Date	Firm	Broad	Diprose	Dow	Fuller	Hunt	Luke	Woodhouse	OTH
6–10 Jul 2025	DemosAU	3.4%	3.0%	10.4%	1.7%	2.3%	1.6%	1.1%	—N/a
21 May 2024	2024 election	6.5%	2.1%	8.2%	—	—	1.4%	—	6.6%

=== Independent candidates ===
Date	Firm	Independent candidates		
Date	Firm	Garland	Martin	Other independents
6–10 Jul 2025	DemosAU	13.7%	3.2%	4.3%
21 May 2024	2024 election	5.1%	—	2.4%

== Clark ==
=== Voting intention ===
Date	Firm	Sample size	Margin of error	Primary vote					
Date	Firm	Sample size	Margin of error	ALP	LIB	GRN	SFF	IND	OTH
6–10 Jul 2025	DemosAU	647	±5.1%	25.6%	28.1%	22.7%	—N/a	23.6%	—N/a
19–26 Jun 2025	DemosAU			23.6%	26.2%	22.7%	—N/a	27.5%	—N/a
12–24 Jun 2025	YouGov	251	±6%	27%	24%	17%	—N/a	30%	2%
21 May 2024	2024 election			30.5%	27.1%	20.9%	1.5%	17.6%	2.4%

=== Labor candidates ===
Date	Firm	Labor candidates							
Date	Firm	Haddad	Kamara	Martin	McLaren	McLaughlin	Shirley	Willie	OTH
6–10 Jul 2025	DemosAU	7.0%	1.8%	2.0%	1.2%	2.6%	1.8%	9.3%	—N/a
21 May 2024	2024 election	10.9%	2.7%	—	—	—	—	8.9%	7.9%

=== Liberal candidates ===
Date	Firm	Liberal candidates							
Date	Firm	Barnett	Behrakis	Di Florio	Johnstone	Ogilvie	Vermey	Wan	OTH
6–10 Jul 2025	DemosAU	1.0%	6.8%	3.4%	1.5%	6.2%	8.3%	0.8%	—N/a
21 May 2024	2024 election	—	8.1%	—	—	7.3%	5.5%	—	6.3%

=== Greens candidates ===
Date	Firm	Greens candidates		
Date	Firm	Bayley	Burnet	Other Greens candidates
6–10 Jul 2025	DemosAU	7.1%	10.4%	5.2%
21 May 2024	2024 election	9.9%	5.4%	5.6%

=== Independent candidates ===
Date	Firm	Independent candidates		
Date	Firm	Archer	Johnston	Other independents
6–10 Jul 2025	DemosAU	4.3%	17.3%	2.1%
21 May 2024	2024 election	—	7.7%	9.4%

== Franklin ==
=== Voting intention ===
Date	Firm	Sample size	Margin of error	Primary vote					
Date	Firm	Sample size	Margin of error	LIB	ALP	GRN	JLN	IND	OTH
6–10 Jul 2025	DemosAU	804	±4.4%	31.7%	22.4%	10.7%	—N/a	35.2%	—N/a
19–26 Jun 2025	DemosAU			29.1%	22.6%	12.9%	—N/a	35.4%	—N/a
12–24 Jun 2025	YouGov	266	±6%	31%	38%	9%	—N/a	20%	2%
21 May 2024	2024 election			34.0%	27.3%	19.8%	4.9%	11.8%	2.4%

=== Liberal candidates ===
Date	Firm	Liberal candidates							
Date	Firm	Abetz	Garvin	Howlett	Miller	Petrusma	Street	Young	OTH
6–10 Jul 2025	DemosAU	10.8%	4.6%	1.3%	2.0%	7.6%	4.4%	1.0%	—N/a
21 May 2024	2024 election	9.2%	1.3%	—	—	8.5%	6.7%	4.3%	4.0%

=== Labor candidates ===
Date	Firm	Labor candidates							
Date	Firm	Brown	Deane	Di Virgilio	Hannan	Meyers	Munday	Winter	OTH
6–10 Jul 2025	DemosAU	4.0%	2.0%	0.6%	0.8%	0.6%	4.2%	10.1%	—N/a
21 May 2024	2024 election	5.0%	2.5%	—	—	—	—	11.2%	8.6%

=== Independent candidates ===
Date	Firm	Independent candidates		
Date	Firm	George	O'Byrne	Other independents
6–10 Jul 2025	DemosAU	18.2%	13.7%	3.4%
21 May 2024	2024 election	—	8.8%	3.0%

== Lyons ==
=== Voting intention ===
Date	Firm	Sample size	Margin of error	Primary vote							
Date	Firm	Sample size	Margin of error	LIB	ALP	GRN	NAT	SFF	JLN	IND	OTH
6–10 Jul 2025	DemosAU	624	±5.2%	35.5%	26.2%	16.3%	6.1%	4.1%	—N/a	11.8%	—N/a
19–26 Jun 2025	DemosAU			35.9%	31.9%	13.1%	3.7%	7.0%	—N/a	8.4%	—N/a
12–24 Jun 2025	YouGov	267	±6%	34%	34%	13%	—N/a	—N/a	—N/a	15%	4%
21 May 2024	2024 election			37.6%	32.8%	10.9%	—	4.8%	8.3%	4.0%	1.6%

=== Liberal candidates ===
Date	Firm	Liberal candidates							
Date	Firm	Barnett	Cameron	Groves	Hallett	Howlett	Lyne	Shelton	OTH
6–10 Jul 2025	DemosAU	8.5%	3.9%	0.7%	3.0%	13.5%	1.1%	4.9%	—N/a
21 May 2024	2024 election	11.1%	3.9%	—	2.5%	9.2%	—	7.0%	3.8%

=== Labor candidates ===
Date	Firm	Labor candidates							
Date	Firm	Batt	Butler	Campbell	Farrell	Goss	Mitchell	O'Donnell	OTH
6–10 Jul 2025	DemosAU	1.6%	11.1%	1.5%	2.8%	2.5%	5.3%	1.4%	—N/a
21 May 2024	2024 election	1.4%	3.2%	—	1.6%	2.4%	—	—	24.2%

=== Nationals candidates ===
Date	Firm	Nationals candidates		
Date	Firm	Jenner	Tucker	Other Nationals candidates
6–10 Jul 2025	DemosAU	1.1%	3.8%	0.9%
21 May 2024	2024 election	2.9%	3.1% (Note: As an independent candidate.)	—

=== Independent candidates ===
Date	Firm	Independent candidates	
Date	Firm	Offord	Other independents
6–10 Jul 2025	DemosAU	6.2%	5.6%
21 May 2024	2024 election	0.3%	3.7%

== Leadership polling ==
=== Preferred premier ===
Date	Firm	Sample size	Margin of error	Party leaders		
Date	Firm	Sample size	Margin of error	Rockliff	Winter	Unsure
7–18 Jul 2025	YouGov (Note: Respondents were asked who their preferred premier was in the event of a hung parliament.)	931	±3.2%	45%	55%	—N/a
Mid-Jul 2025	EMRS			44%	29%	27%
6–10 Jul 2025	DemosAU	3,421	±2.1%	40.7%	31.1%	28.2%
6–8 Jul 2025	EMRS	500		43%	30%	27%
29 Jun–1 Jul 2025	EMRS	550		44%	32%	24%
19–26 Jun 2025	DemosAU	4,289		41%	32%	27%
12–24 Jun 2025	YouGov	1,287	±3.4%	43%	36%	21%
13–17 May 2025	EMRS	1,000	±3.1%	44%	32%	23%
11–18 Feb 2025	EMRS	1,000	±3.1%	44%	34%	21%
5–14 Nov 2024	EMRS	1,000	±3.1%	43%	37%	19%
14–21 Aug 2024	EMRS	1,000		45%	30%	25%
16–23 May 2021	EMRS	1,000		40%	32%	26%

=== Favourability ratings ===
Date	Firm	Sample size	Margin of error	Rockliff					Winter				
Date	Firm	Sample size	Margin of error	Fav	Neutral	Unfav	Unsure	Net	Fav	Neutral	Unfav	Unsure	Net
11–18 Feb 2025	EMRS	1,000	±3.1%	36%	29%	25%	3%	+10%	18%	34%	11%	10%	+6%
5–14 Nov 2024	EMRS	1,000	±3.1%	37%	36%	22%	3%	+15%	25%	38%	11%	8%	+14%
