= Tasmanian Greens Spokespeople =

2024 shadow ministry in Tasmania, Australia

Frontbench of the Tasmanian Greens of Rosalie Woodruff
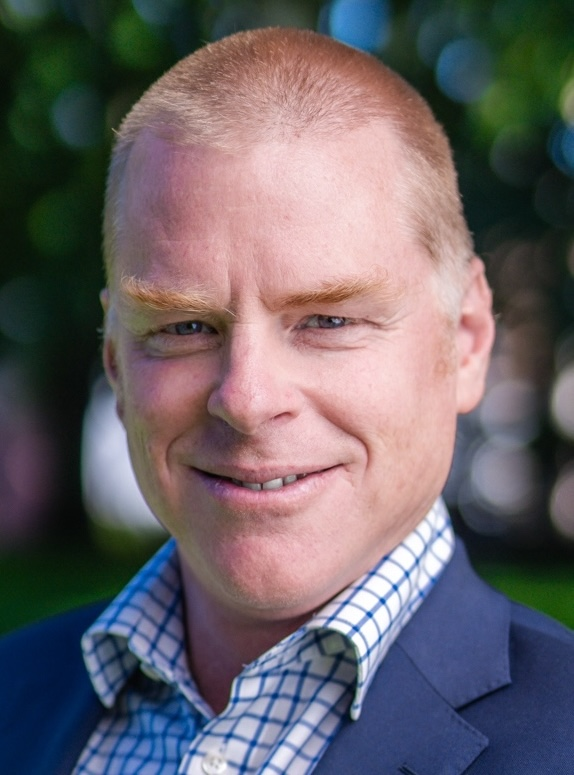
- Vica Bayley (Deputy Leader)

People and organisations
- Leader: Rosalie Woodruff
- Leader's history: Tasmanian State MP
- Deputy Leader: Vica Bayley
- No. of ministers: 5
- Member party: Tasmanian Greens
- Status in legislature: Crossbench 5 / 50 (10%)

History
- Election: 2024 · 2024 · 2025

The Tasmanian Greens appoint members of their party to specific portfolios to shadow cabinet ministers actions, and represent their views on specific issues in the Tasmanian Parliament.

The Greens have not been in cabinet since 2014, when the Labor-Greens coalition collapsed.

The current Frontbench of the Tasmanian Greens is that of Rosalie Woodruff. Her frontbench has contested 3 elections in which they succeeded in at least one seat: 2024 state; 2024 Legco; and 2025 state.

== Woodruff composition ==
Party	Ministry Member	Portrait	Portfolio	Notes
Greens	Rosalie Woodruff	RosalieWoodruff (cropped)	Greens Leader; Aboriginal Affairs; Forests; LGBTIQA+ Animal Welfare; Marine Environment; Workplace Relations and Safety	Leader since 2023, MP for Franklin
Greens	Vica Bayley		Greens Deputy Leader; Leader of Greens Business; Treasury and Finance; Energy; Environment and Biodiversity; Housing and Consumer Protection; Multicultural Affairs; Sport and Events; Veterans Affairs; Arts	Deputy Leader since 2023, MP for Clark
Greens	Cecily Rosol		Health and Mental Wellbeing; Children and Young People; Corrections and Rehabilitation; Community Service; Ageing; Disability Services; Local Government; Women; Waste	MP for Bass
Greens	Tabatha Badger		National Parks and Public Land; Primary Industries; Water; Police, Fire and Emergency Management; Skills and Training; Prevention of Family Violence; Tourism and Hospitality; Small Business; Science and Information Technology; Mining	
Greens	Cassy O'Connor	Cassy-Oconnor-2017-Ross	Climate Change; Attorney-General and Justice; Democracy and Integrity; Education; Animal Rights; Infrastructure and Transport; Planning; Heritage	Former Leader of the Greens and MP for Clark, currently MLC for Hobart
