= Leader of the Tasmanian Greens =

- Incumbent; Rosalie Woodruff since 13 July 2023
- Style: The Honourable
- Member of: Tasmanian Parliament
- Appointer: Tasmanian Greens Caucus
- Constituting instrument: Tasmanian Greens Constitution; Constitution of Tasmania
- Formation: 1992
- First holder: Bob Brown
- Unofficial names: Greens Leader
- Salary: $140,185
- Website: https://greens.org.au/tas

The Leader of the Tasmanian Greens is the highest parliamentary role of the Tasmanian Greens. Its role is to be the main spokesperson of the party, and be held responsible for the party's actions. The role is elected by the party caucus. The incumbent is Rosalie Woodruff, who has held the office since 2023, after former leader Cassy O'Connor resigned from the parliament to begin her campaign for the 2024 Tasmanian Legislative Council Election.
