= Peter George (politician) =

Australian politician (born 1951)

Peter George MHA
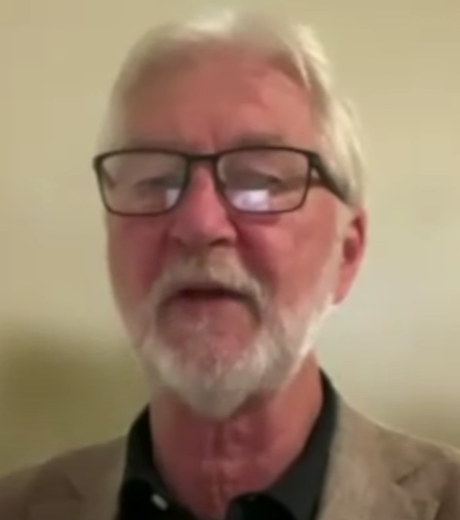
- George in 2025

Member of the Tasmanian House of Assembly for Franklin
- Incumbent
- Assumed office 19 July 2025 Serving with 6 others
- Preceded by: Nic Street

Personal details
- Born: Peter Antony George; 1951 (age 74–75)
- Party: Independent
- Profession: Journalist

Peter Antony George (born 1951) is an Australian politician and member for Franklin in the Tasmanian House of Assembly. He received the highest primary vote of all Franklin candidates at the 2025 Tasmanian state election.

George had previously contested the 2025 federal election as an independent candidate for the federal seat of Franklin. He received 42.2% of the two-candidate-preferred vote.

== Personal life ==
George was born in 1951 to an Australian mother and British father. After living in several countries, his family settled in Sydney when he was 15. He had a long-term, close personal relationship with fellow journalist Susan Curran, with whom he had children. He later worked across Australia, New Zealand, and internationally as a journalist, eventually spending several years sailing the Pacific with his wife Jessica, a former Four Corners editor.

George settled in Cygnet, Tasmania in recent years, following his retirement. He became a prominent voice in local opposition to salmon farming, taking on the role of President of Neighbours of Fish Farming (NOFF). His environmental advocacy gained attention after a major salmon die-off in 2025, prompting his decision to run for federal parliament as an independent in the seat of Franklin.

== Journalistic career ==
Peter George worked for both public and commercial news organizations, beginning his career as a reporter for The Sydney Morning Herald. He is primarily known for his work at the Australian Broadcasting Corporation as a Foreign Correspondent, and he also worked for the commercial network show Page One, which featured current affairs and pop culture, and was involved with the ABC investigative program Four Corners. George's time in commercial television at Page One ended abruptly due to a clash with management. After submitting a report on the Intifada, he refused to make management-demanded changes, believing they would utterly alter its balance. He attributed the pressure to managerial concern about offending owners, the Lowy family.

George reported from a range of critical international flashpoints, including the Iran-Iraq War, the Falklands War, and the Soviet troop pullout from Afghanistan. He engaged with political figures like Yasser Arafat, Khalil al-Wazir, Intissar al-Wazir, Margaret Thatcher and Shimon Peres.

George wrote about his experience as a Foreign Correspondent in his book Behind the Lines: The Personal Story of an ABC Foreign Correspondent.

His work for the Four Corners documentary "The Palestinians" which focused on the conflict from the Palestinian perspective, was criticised in Australia. George acknowledged that critics complained the report was propaganda for the PLO and anti-Semitic. The report was based on a contentious opinion poll and included an interview with Khalil al-Wazir, who, when asked to condemn attacks on Israeli civilians, offered a careful but widely criticised refusal to do so. George's opinion of al-Wazir was multifaceted: he considered him a "quiet, hospitable man" whom he grew to "personally like and admire," yet he simultaneously recognised him as the "hard man of the Palestinian revolution" whose commands inevitably led to bloodshed.

== Political positions ==
After being successfully elected on 19 July 2025, George described three main priorities for the next political term. George is against a proposal to build the Macquarie Point Stadium, required in the current agreement with the AFL for Tasmania to gain their own team. On election night, he stated that, "We cannot afford a stadium that will end up at 2 billion dollars... We cannot be bullied by the AFL. We can have two teams — men's and women's teams — without a stadium".

George is strongly opposed to salmon farming in Tasmania, citing the environmental damage they allegedly cause and the risk to endangered species. On election night, he explained, "We have to stop the decimation of our waterways by the multinational salmon farms. We have to stop supporting them, and we have to stop the expansion into our waters". Protecting native forests from logging companies is another of George's priorities.

Another focus was modification to Tasmania's Integrity Commission, which he views as ineffective in its current state. George believes, "We all need to agree on a properly financed Integrity Commission that's able to do its job and restore Tasmanians' faith in their government".

George opposed the Falklands War, suggesting the conflict was one that "need never had started in the first place".

George supports reducing the quantity of Tasmanians on the waitlist for urgent housing.

George has been critical of both of the Tasmanian Liberal and Labor parties, who he sees as both having caused the early 2025 election due to their unwillingness to cooperate with the Greens and other crossbenchers to form minority government. "If neither of the [two major parties] can speak to the crossbench, that is their problem, it is not the problem of the crossbench, nor will it be the problem of the Greens."
