= Miriam Beswick =

Australian politician

Member of the Tasmanian House of Assembly for Braddon
- In office 23 March 2024 – 19 July 2025
- Succeeded by: Gavin Pearce

Personal details
- Party: National (2025)
- Other political affiliations: Jacqui Lambie Network (until 2024); Independent (2024–2025)

Miriam Beswick is a former Australian politician who represented the Division of Braddon in the Tasmanian House of Assembly from 2024 to 2025. She was one of three MPs elected in 2024 representing the Jacqui Lambie Network, the others being Rebekah Pentland and Andrew Jenner.

In August 2024, she and Rebekah Pentland were expelled from the Jacqui Lambie Network.

Beswick announced on 16 June 2025 that she had joined the National Party and would seek preselection for the 2025 state election. She ran for re-election in Braddon as the top candidate for the Nationals, but was defeated, with her seat assumed by former federal Liberal MP Gavin Pearce.
