= George Razay =

Australian politician

Professor Cr. George Razay MP

Member of the Tasmanian House of Assembly for Bass
- Incumbent
- Assumed office 19 July 2025 Serving with 6 others
- Preceded by: Rebekah Pentland

Councillor for Launceston
- Incumbent
- Assumed office October 2022

Personal details
- Born: 21 March 1956 (age 70) Al-Malkieh, Al Hassaka, Second Syrian Republic
- Citizenship: Australian; Syrian (Note: Wishes to renounce but cannot without returning to the country); British (1992–2022)
- Party: Independent
- Profession: Medical doctor

George Razay (Arabic: جورج رضائي; born 21 March 1956) is a Syrian-born Australian politician and medical practitioner. He was elected to the Tasmanian House of Assembly at the 2025 state election, running as an independent in the Division of Bass in the Tasmanian House of Assembly at the 2025 state election. He was previously elected to Launceston City Council in 2022 and worked as a geriatrician at Launceston General Hospital.

During his time in parliament, he has focused on health issues.

== Personal life ==
George Razay was born on 21 March 1956 in the village of Al-Malkieh to an Assyrian family, in the Al-Hassaka region, of the Second Syrian Republic. His father Salim Razay (1926–1965) was born in Azekh, Turkey, and his mother Makboula (née Amno) was born in Derik, Al-Malkieh, First Syrian Republic in 1935. Both belonged to the Syriac Orthodox Church of Antioch.

He later moved to the United Kingdom and became a British citizen in 1992. He renounced his British citizenship prior to standing at the 2022 Australian federal election in accordance with section 44 of the constitution, but was unable to renounce his Syrian citizenship as he had not completed compulsory military service and did not wish to return to the country.

== Education ==
After completing a six-year medical degree at Aleppo University, George's father Salim Razay gathered £1,000 to aid George's move to England to further his studies, initially at Birmingham General Hospital and then Bristol Royal Infirmary Department of Medicine. As he had not completed a one-year internship before leaving Syria, he faced difficulties obtaining British medical registration. Thanks to his colleagues in Bristol, he was granted an exemption allowing him to take and pass the required examinations.

Razay would go on to pass the membership examination for the Royal College of Physicians in Glasgow, and began work as a medical registrar at Torbay Hospital.

== Medical career ==
Razay moved to Tasmania in the late 1990s, settling in Launceston and working as a geriatrician at Launceston General Hospital. He was director of the Wicking Dementia Research and Education Centre in Launceston and held the title of clinical professor at the University of Tasmania. He undertook research into dementia and Alzheimer's disease, including links between Alzheimer's and obesity and the treatment of idiopathic normal pressure hydrocephalus.

== Politics ==
Razay was an unsuccessful independent candidate for the House of Representatives at the 2022 and 2025 federal elections, running in the Division of Bass. He was elected to a four-year term on the Launceston City Council in October 2022.

At the 2025 state election, Razay was elected as an independent member of the Tasmanian House of Assembly in the seat of Bass, having previously run unsuccessfully at the 2024 state election. He polled 3.5 percent of primary votes in Bass but received strong preference flows. He stood on a platform which included opposition to the Macquarie Point Stadium and "improving the health, education and housing systems" in the state "to turn Tasmania from one of the sickest states in Australia, to one of the most healthy, happy and active communities".
