= Tabatha Badger =

Australian politician (born 1993)

Tabatha Badger MP
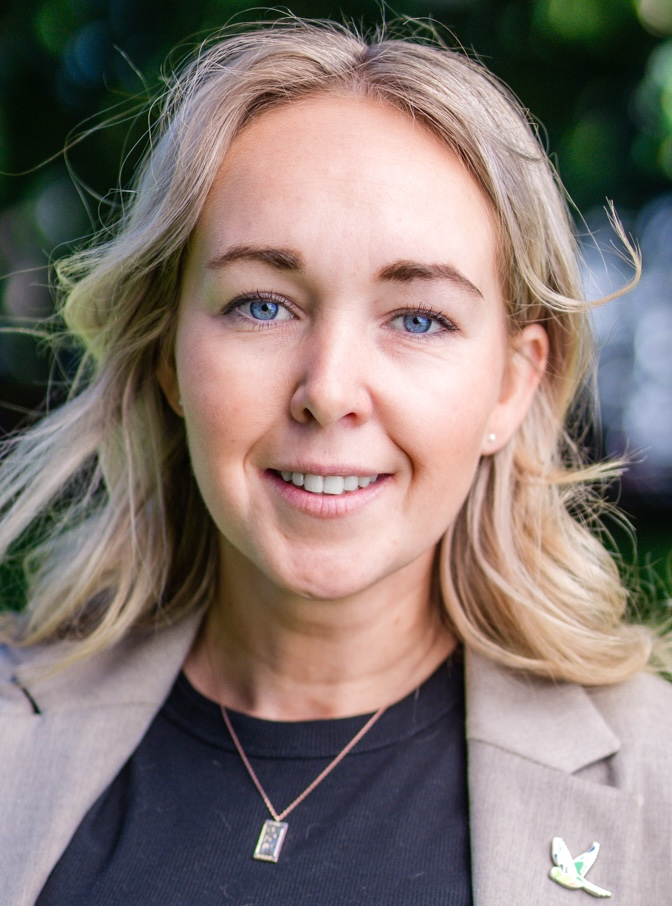

Member of the Tasmanian House of Assembly for Lyons
- Incumbent
- Assumed office 23 March 2024

Tasmanian Greens Spokesperson
- Incumbent
- Assumed office 23 March 2024
- Portfolios: Primary Industries, Police, Fire and Emergency Management, Parks and Public Land, Skills and Training, Tourism and Hospitality, Prevention of Family Violence, Small Business, Science and Information Technology, Mining

Personal details
- Born: 8 June 1993 (age 33) Burnie, Tasmania
- Party: Greens
- Education: Masters in Tourism
- Alma mater: University of Tasmania
- Website: https://tasgreensmps.org

Tabatha Anne Badger (born 8 June 1993) is an Australian politician who has represented the division of Lyons since 23 March 2024. Badger is a member of the Tasmanian Greens and is representing several portfolios for the party.

== Pre-politics ==
Tabatha studied at the a University of Tasmania, obtaining a Masters in Tourism. She soon started a small business in ecosystem management. In 2023, Badger was appointed Convenor of the Wilderness Society.

== Political career ==
In the 2022 Australian Senate election, she was the 3rd green candidate in Tasmania but was not elected.

=== 2024 state election ===
At the 2024 Tasmanian state election, Badger was the lead candidate for the Tasmanian Greens in Lyons. At the end of first-preference counting, she received the 5th highest vote count in Lyons, and the highest of a Greens candidate for the division, at 4,044 votes. This was not enough to be elected on first-preferences, however. As the Hare–Clark counting went on Badger, along with the Lambie candidates, received significant leakage from the Labor ticket, via Rebecca White's large surplus. This boosted Badger's own quota, and by the end of the counting after all the other Greens candidates were excluded, she had a total of 0.93 quotas, leading for her to be elected in the last spot for Lyons.

She is the youngest member of the 51st Parliament of Tasmania.

Badger was re-elected at the 2025 Tasmanian state election. At the parliamentary swearing-in after the 2025 election, Badger was the only member for Lyons who chose the affirmation of allegiance over the religious oath of allegiance.

== Personal life ==
Badger grew up around Table Cape before her family moved to Hobart where she attended New Town Primary School and later Ogilvie High School. Badger now lives in Ellendale, Tasmania .
