= 2025 Tasmanian state election =

State election in Australia

- 19 July 2025

All 35 seats in the House of Assembly 18 seats needed for a majority
- Opinion polls
- Turnout: 90.05% (▼1.10pp)
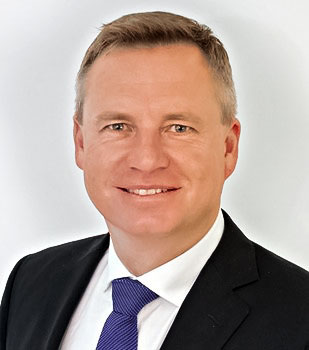

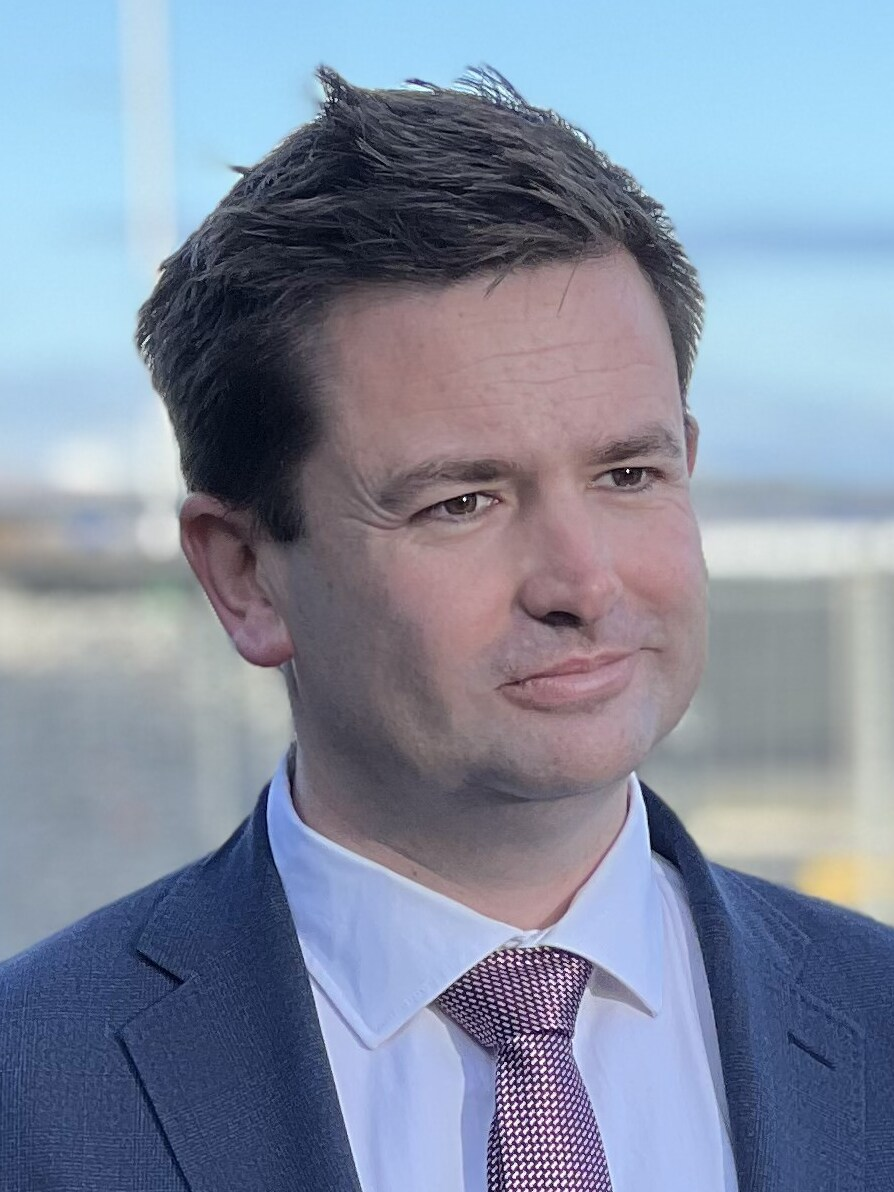

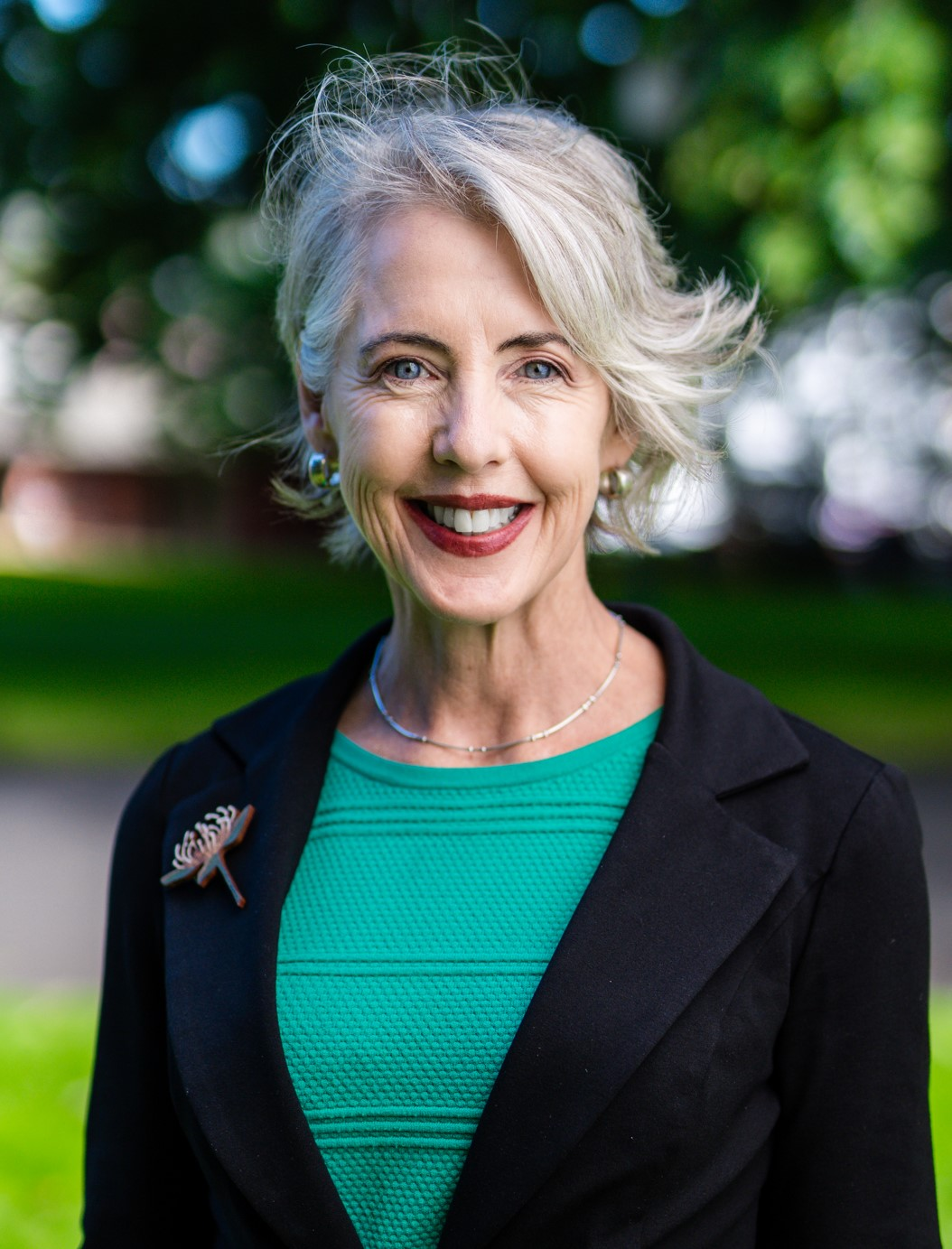
	First party	Second party
Leader	Jeremy Rockliff	Dean Winter
Party	Liberal	Labor
Leader since	8 April 2022	10 April 2024
Leader's seat	Braddon	Franklin
Last election	14 seats	10 seats
Seats before	14	10
Seats won	14	10
Seat change	Steady	Steady
Primary vote	139,586	90,563
Percentage	39.87%	25.87%
Swing	▲3.20pp	▼3.13pp
	Third party	Fourth party
		SFF
Leader	Rosalie Woodruff	Adrian Pickin
Party	Greens	Shooters
Leader since	13 July 2023	N/A
Leader's seat	Franklin	None (contested Braddon)
Last election	5 seats	0 seats
Seats before	5	0
Seats won	5	1
Seat change	Steady	▲1
Primary vote	50,545	10,159
Percentage	14.44%	2.90%
Swing	▲0.55pp	▲0.57pp
- Results per electorate
Premier before election
Jeremy Rockliff
Liberal
Subsequent Premier
Jeremy Rockliff
Liberal

The 2025 Tasmanian state election was held on 19 July 2025 to elect all 35 members of the Tasmanian House of Assembly.

The election was precipitated by a no-confidence motion in the Liberal government, led by state premier Jeremy Rockliff who had governed in minority since the preceding 2024 election. Rockliff sought to call a snap election in response, which was granted by state governor Barbara Baker on 11 June 2025. The election was conducted by the Tasmanian Electoral Commission and was held just 15 months after the previous election, the third consecutive Tasmanian state election to be held early.

The Liberal Party was attempting to win a fifth consecutive term against the Australian Labor Party (ALP) opposition led by Dean Winter, who was contesting his first election as opposition leader. Rockliff was the first premier to contest consecutive Tasmanian elections since Robin Gray in 1989.

The election resulted in a second consecutive hung parliament. The Liberals won the most seats and highest primary vote, winning 14 out of 35 seats, while the ALP opposition won 10 seats and recorded its lowest primary vote in over 100 years. Crossbenchers won the remaining 11 seats, with the Greens and independents winning five seats each and the Shooters, Fishers and Farmers Party winning its first seat in Tasmania.

Negotiations with the crossbenchers to form a new government began after the election, but neither Rockliff nor Winter were able to secure sufficient formal confidence and supply guarantees. Rockliff was ultimately recommissioned as premier as head of a Liberal minority government, with his ministry sworn in on 11 August 2025.

== Background ==
=== Previous election ===
The House of Assembly uses the proportional Hare-Clark system of voting, with the 35 members elected from five seven-member constituencies. The Assembly's size is governed by the provisions of the Expansion of House of Assembly Act 2022, assented to in December 2022. Elections for the 15-seat single-member district upper house, known as the Legislative Council, which use full-preference instant-runoff voting, are staggered each year and conducted separately from lower house state elections with the next to be held in 2026.

The Liberal Party won 14 of the 35 seats in the Assembly at the previous election, and formed a minority government with the support of three Jacqui Lambie Network members and two independents, namely Kristie Johnston and David O'Byrne. Labor remained in opposition with 10 members and the Greens won five seats. The new parliament was opened on 14 May 2024, and Labor member Michelle O'Byrne was elected unopposed to the position of Speaker of the Assembly.

=== Minority government arrangements and changes in parliament ===
On 24 August 2024, Jacqui Lambie Network (JLN) party leader Jacqui Lambie announced the party had expelled MPs Rebekah Pentland and Miriam Beswick over what she described as issues of accountability, transparency and integrity. Both MPs subsequently became independents in the parliament, briefly reducing the government's confidence and supply numbers to 17 out of 35 seats. Shortly thereafter Pentland and Beswick issued a joint statement clarifying they would remain in parliament as independents, and that both would sign a new confidence and supply agreement with the government. This agreement was confirmed on 27 August 2024.

Following the expulsion of Pentland and Beswick, Lambie announced she would not run candidates in Tasmanian state elections in the future. She also apologised to Rockliff for government instability after her party 'imploded'.

In September 2024, Andrew Jenner, the sole remaining JLN member, confirmed he was no longer party to the original confidence and supply agreement signed by the three original JLN members and the government, and that he would not sign up to a new confidence and supply arrangement. In an interview with WIN News, Jenner clarified he had provided the Premier with only a "verbal agreement" for confidence and supply.

Jenner and Beswick joined the National Party in June 2025.

==== Changes in the Tasmanian parliament after the 2024 election ====
Seat	Before		Change		After		
Seat	Member	Party	Type	Date	Date	Member	Party
Braddon	Miriam Beswick	Lambie Network	Expulsion from party	24 August 2024		Miriam Beswick	Independent
Bass	Rebekah Pentland	Lambie Network	Expulsion from party	24 August 2024		Rebekah Pentland	Independent
Lyons	Rebecca White	Labor	Resignation	12 February 2025	4 March 2025	Casey Farrell	Labor
Lyons	Andrew Jenner	Lambie Network	Party not contesting	14 June 2025		Andrew Jenner	National
Braddon	Miriam Beswick	Independent	Joined party	16 June 2025		Miriam Beswick	National

=== No-confidence motion and snap election ===
On 4 June 2025, opposition leader and Labor leader Dean Winter tabled a motion of no confidence to parliament. Winter moved the motion one week after the government released the state budget, which forecast four deficits and debt reaching $10.8 billion in the 2028–29 financial year, and labelled it "the worst budget in the state's history". Other issues pertinent to debate on the motion in the parliament included turmoil and delays regarding replacement ferries for TT-Line (more commonly known as Spirit of Tasmania), the Macquarie Point Stadium project in Hobart, and the slated privatisation of some of Tasmania's state-owned assets. The motion specifically sought no confidence in Premier Jeremy Rockliff, as opposed to the government, though Rockliff stated he would request a snap election if the motion was passed.

On 5 June 2025, the no-confidence motion passed 18–17, attracting the support of all 10 Labor MPs (including the Speaker Michelle O'Byrne who provided the casting vote in favour of the motion), 5 Greens MPs, 2 independents (Kristie Johnston and Craig Garland) and Andrew Jenner of the Jacqui Lambie Network. Until the motion, Johnston had provided confidence and supply to the government, whilst Jenner had previously characterised himself as having given a "verbal agreement" to the government. Among the negative votes were all 14 Liberal MPs and 3 independents (Miriam Beswick, Rebekah Pentland and former Labor leader turned independent David O'Byrne).

Following the motion's passage, Rockliff visited Lieutenant-Governor Christopher Shanahan to request a special recall of parliament for the following Tuesday, at which parliament considered and passed emergency supply extension bills, to ensure government employees continued to be paid beyond 30 June 2025, when the previous year's budget expires. Shortly after the passage of the supply bills, Rockliff visited Governor Barbara Baker to ask for an election to be called. Following this meeting the Governor released a statement noting she was "taking the time necessary to give due consideration to all available options", which could include requesting another Liberal MP try and form a minority government or ask Labor to form one. The next day the Governor met with Labor leader Dean Winter, where Winter reaffirmed his party would not form a government with support from the Greens. Later that evening the Governor released a statement granting Rockliff's request for a snap election to be held on 19 July, finding "there is no real possibility that an alternative government can be formed".

The gap between the July 2025 election and the preceding March 2024 election was the shortest gap between Australian state elections since the 1956 and 1957 Queensland state elections.

== Election timetable ==
Important dates in relation to the election were:

- Wednesday 18 June: Issue of the writs, close of rolls and opening of candidate nominations
- Thursday 26 June: Candidate nominations close
- Friday 27 June: Announcement of nominations
- Monday 30 June: Early voting opens
- Friday 11 July: Postal voting applications close
- Wednesday 16 July: Sky News–Mercury Leaders' Debate
- Saturday 19 July: Polling day

== Retiring MPs ==
=== Labor ===
- Michelle O'Byrne (Bass) – announced retirement 10 June 2025

== Candidates ==
Parties who were registered with the Tasmanian Electoral Commission (TEC) were eligible to contest the election. Seven parties were registered at the time the election was called:

- Animal Justice (not endorsing candidates)
- Labor
- Liberal
- Shooters, Fishers and Farmers
- Greens
- Jacqui Lambie Network (not endorsing candidates)
- The Nationals

== Opinion polling ==
Local regression of primary vote opinion polling for the 2025 Tasmanian state election

== Results ==
Party	Votes	%	+/–	Seats	+/–
Liberal	139,586	39.87	▲3.20	14	Steady
Labor	90,563	25.87	▼3.13	10	Steady
Greens	50,545	14.44	▲0.55	5	Steady
Shooters, Fishers and Farmers	10,159	2.90	▲0.57	1	▲1
National	5,668	1.62	▲1.62	0	Steady
Independents	53,600	15.31	▲5.69	5	▲2
Total	350,121	100.00	–	35	–
Valid votes	350,121	94.16			
Invalid/blank votes	21,701	5.84	▼0.47		
Total votes	371,822	100.00	–		
Registered voters/turnout	412,905	90.05	▼1.10		
Source: ABC, TEC

Newly-elected MPs
New MP		Division	Predecessor		Ref.
Independent	George Razay	Bass	Independent	Rebekah Pentland (Lambie-turned-independent)	
Liberal	Bridget Archer	Bass	Liberal	Simon Wood	
Labor	Jess Greene	Bass	Labor	Michelle O'Byrne (retired)	
Liberal	Gavin Pearce	Braddon	Nationals	Miriam Beswick (Lambie-turned-independent-turned-National)	
Liberal	Marcus Vermey	Clark	Liberal	Simon Behrakis	
Independent	Peter George	Franklin	Liberal	Nic Street	
SFF	Carlo Di Falco	Lyons	Nationals	Andrew Jenner (Lambie-turned-National)	
Labor	Brian Mitchell	Lyons	Labor	Casey Farrell	

=== Distribution of seats ===
Electorate	Seats won						
Bass	Janie Finlay	Jess Greene	Cecily Rosol	George Razay	Bridget Archer	Michael Ferguson	Rob Fairs
Braddon	Anita Dow	Shane Broad	Craig Garland	Jeremy Rockliff	Gavin Pearce	Felix Ellis	Roger Jaensch
Clark	Ella Haddad	Josh Willie	Vica Bayley	Helen Burnet	Kristie Johnston	Marcus Vermey	Madeleine Ogilvie
Franklin	Dean Winter	Meg Brown	Rosalie Woodruff	David O'Byrne	Peter George	Eric Abetz	Jacquie Petrusma
Lyons	Jen Butler	Brian Mitchell	Tabatha Badger	Carlo Di Falco	Guy Barnett	Jane Howlett	Mark Shelton

Liberal
Labor
Greens
Independent
Shooters

== Aftermath ==
On election night speaking at the tally room, incumbent Premier Jeremy Rockliff claimed victory for his party; Dean Winter did not concede defeat for Labor; and Greens leader Rosalie Woodruff expressed a willingness to form a minority government with Labor. Winter's words on election night were seen as a retraction of his prior pledges which completely ruled out forming government with the Greens.

Rockliff was recommissioned as Premier following the election by convention; however his confidence in parliament was tested on 19 August, when Labor also sought to form a government. Labor's joint no-confidence motion in Rockliff's government and confidence motion in Dean Winter was voted down in a landslide, with 24 "No" votes to Labor's 10 "Aye" votes.

In the weeks following the election, Labor and the Liberals sought crossbench support for their respective government bids. The Labor party announced that if they were successful at forming a government, Ruth Forrest would be appointed as Treasurer. The Liberals reversed a prior commitment to expand native forestry, announced a ban on greyhound racing starting from 2029, announced a pause to the expansion of salmon farming until an independent review into the industry is completed and appointed independent Tania Rattray to lead the government in the upper house.
