= Gavin Pearce =

Australian politician (born 1967)

The Honourable Gavin Pearce MP
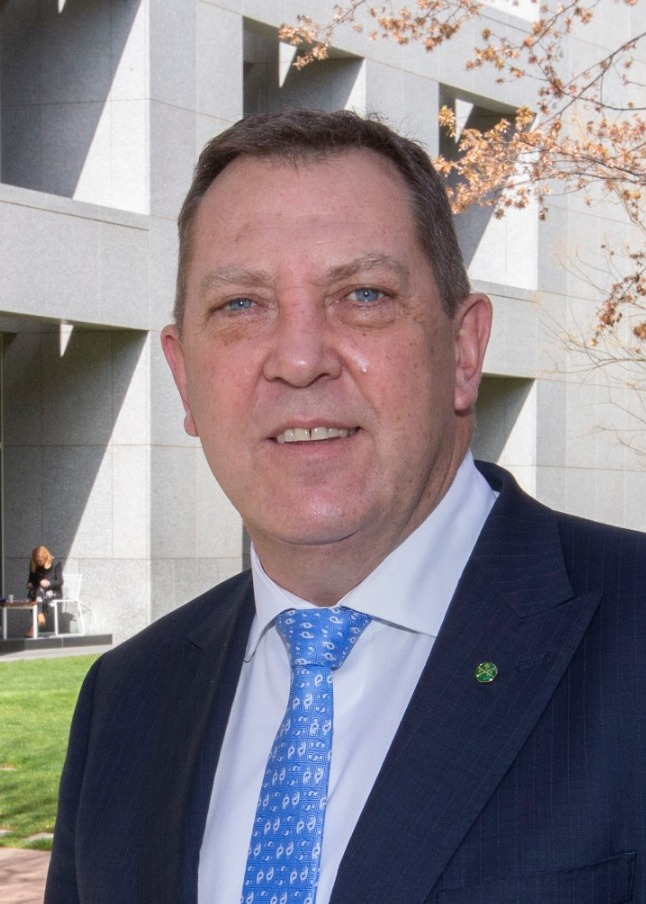

Minister for Primary Industries and Water
- Incumbent
- Assumed office 11 August 2025
- Premier: Jeremy Rockliff
- Preceded by: Jane Howlett

Minister for Veterans' Affairs
- Incumbent
- Assumed office 11 August 2025
- Premier: Jeremy Rockliff
- Preceded by: Roger Jaensch

Member of the Tasmanian House of Assembly for Braddon
- Incumbent
- Assumed office 19 July 2025 Serving with 6 others
- Preceded by: Miriam Beswick

Member of the Australian Parliament for Braddon
- In office 18 May 2019 – 28 March 2025
- Preceded by: Justine Keay
- Succeeded by: Anne Urquhart

Personal details
- Born: 21 December 1967 (age 58) Wynyard, Tasmania, Australia
- Party: Liberal
- Occupation: Soldier and Farmer

Gavin Bruce Pearce (born 21 December 1967) is an Australian politician who has served as a Liberal member of the Tasmanian House of Assembly for Braddon since the 2025 Tasmanian state election. He had previously served as the member for Braddon in the House of Representatives from 2019 until his retirement at the 2025 federal election.

He has served as a minister in the third Rockliff ministry since 11 August 2025.

== Early life ==
Pearce was born in Tasmania to a family which has "lived and farmed in the Sisters Creek region since the 1850s". He served in the army for 20 years, and was stationed in East Timor for a period. He later became the president of the Wynyard RSL branch. Prior to entering politics, Pearce farmed beef cattle at Lapoinya. He was vice-chair of the Yolla Producers Cooperative Society, based in Wynyard.

== Politics ==
=== Federal Politics ===
In October 2018, Pearce won Liberal preselection for the Division of Braddon. He had previously stood for preselection at the 2018 Braddon by-election, but was defeated by former Liberal MP Brett Whiteley.

At the 2019 federal election, Pearce defeated the incumbent Labor MP Justine Keay with a five-point swing on the two-party-preferred count. It was the third consecutive federal election in which the incumbent MP has been defeated in Braddon.

Pearce is a member of the National Right faction of the Liberal Party.

Pearce was re-elected at the 2022 Australian Federal Election with a +6.22% swing in the primary vote as well a +4.94% in the two-party-preferred result, despite the Liberal Party facing significant seat losses across Australia.

After the 2022 Federal Election and subsequent election of Peter Dutton as leader of the Liberal Party, Pearce was appointed to the Shadow ministry of Peter Dutton as Assistant Shadow Minister for Health, Aged Care and Indigenous Health Services which he has served in since 5 June 2022.

On 11 June 2024, Pearce announced that he would retire at the 2025 Australian federal election, to spend more time with his family.

=== State Politics ===
Pearce was elected as a Liberal member for state division of Braddon at the 2025 Tasmanian Election, picking up an extra seat for the party in the seven member electorate. Pearce joins former federal colleagues Bridget Archer and Labor's Brian Mitchell in moving from Federal to State politics at the 2025 election.

== Personal life ==
Pearce met his first wife Amanda-Jane while they were both in the military. They had one son together before her death from lymphoma in 2009, aged 32. As of 2019, he was engaged to Megan McGinty with whom he has one daughter.

Pearce lives in Lapoinya in Tasmania. He owns multiple agriculture properties in Tasmania.

Parliament of Australia
Preceded by Justine Keay	Member for Braddon; 2019–2025	Succeeded by Anne Urquhart
