= Tasmanian National Party =

Tasmanian Nationals
- Founded: 1922 (Country Party); 1962 (re-established); 1994 (re-established); 2013 (re-established); 2018 (re-established)
- Headquarters: 59 Wellington St, Longford, Tasmania 7301
- Youth wing: Young Nationals
- Ideology: Conservatism; Agrarianism
- Political position: Centre-right
- Colours: Green and yellow
- House of Representatives: 0 / 5 (Tas. seats)
- Senate: 0 / 12 (Tas. seats)
- House of Assembly: 0 / 35
- City of Devonport: 1 / 9
- City of Hobart: 1 / 12

Website
- tasnationals.org.au

The Tasmanian Nationals (officially registered as The National Party of Australia – Tasmania) are the affiliate of the National Party of Australia in the state of Tasmania.

The party has a history in Tasmania dating back to 1922, and has previously used the names Country Party, Centre Party, and National Country Party. It has had limited electoral success and has dissolved itself or disappeared on a number of occasions, sometimes for a few decades. The party was briefly re-established in 2018, after independent senator Steve Martin became the first member of the party in federal parliament since the 1920s. The party was re-registered with the Tasmanian Electoral Commission in January 2025.

== History ==
=== Formation and early years ===
No state Country Party organisation existed in Tasmania before 1922, although in the 1919 federal election former MP Norman Cameron sought to regain the Division of Wilmot as a Country candidate. In 1920, members of the Australian House of Representatives elected from other state Country parties came together to form the Country Party, with long-serving Tasmanian MP William McWilliams, the sitting member for the Division of Franklin, assisting in the formation of the party and serving as its initial leader. The party was also joined by Llewellyn Atkinson, the sitting member for Wilmot. McWilliams was replaced as leader in 1921 and defeated in the 1922 election, but the Country Party gained Darwin with Joshua Whitsitt.

1922 saw the creation of a state party by the Tasmanian Farmers, Stockowners and Orchardists' Association. It was joined by several sitting members of the Tasmanian House of Assembly including Nationalists Ernest Blyth (Division of Lyons) William Dixon (Franklin), Edward Hobbs (Darwin), and independent Joshua Whitsitt (Darwin). At the 1922 state election Whitsitt stood down to transfer to federal politics and Dixon was defeated but Blyth led the party to gain three further members Richard Franks (Darwin, holding Whitsitt's seat), John Piggott (Franklin, taking Dixon's seat) and Albert Bendall (Wilmot). The overall result gave the Country Party the balance of power and they were able to force the replacement of Premier Walter Lee with John Hayes at the head of a coalition with Blyth as minister for lands and mines.

However the party was to soon fall apart during the Assembly's term, with Piggott sitting as an Independent, Blyth and Bendall moving to the Nationalists and Hobbs joining a "Liberal" grouping based on Lee. Franks retired at the 1925 election. At the federal level Whitsitt retired in 1925 with no Country Party candidate defending Darwin. Atkinson continued to sit for the Country Party as late as at least 1926, but by the 1928 election he had joined the Nationalists. The Country Party ceased to exist in the state.

=== Late 20th century ===
For the next few decades there was virtually no Country Party electoral activity in the state bar a single candidacy in Franklin in the 1934 federal election.

In 1962 a new Country Party organisation was formed in the state which would last until 1975. In November 1962, the appointments were announced of independent MLC Charles Best as provisional state chairman and former Liberal Party organiser H. S. Huntington as state director. The party established its headquarters in Launceston and was admitted as a fully affiliated state branch of the Country Party in December 1962. The Country Party contested the 1964 state election but won no seats.

In October 1966, the Tasmanian branch of the Country Party changed its name to the Australian Centre Party. Kevin Lyons, a former Liberal turned independent member of the Assembly for Braddon, became the party's leader. Lyons retained his seat at the 1969 state election, which resulted in a hung parliament. He threw his support to his former Liberal colleagues, and served as Deputy Premier under Angus Bethune until 1972 when Lyons withdrew support, collapsing the coalition. The Centre Party did not contest the resulting election.

The party contested the Senate in the 1974 federal election and then stood for both the Senate and House in the 1975 federal election (by now as the National Country Party) but had no success. The party disappeared that year.

The party was formed again in 1994 and in 1996 contested the state election, and the federal election in both the House and Senate but once again secured only a small vote with rural interests preferring the Liberals instead. The party was registered federally with the Australian Electoral Commission (AEC) from October 1995 to April 1998, under the name "National Party of Australia – Tasmania".

=== 21st century ===
The party reorganised and registered in the state in 2013 and were subsequently joined by former Labor minister Allison Ritchie. However disagreements with the federal party over strategy led to the latter distancing itself. Scott Mitchell, the federal director of the Nationals, stated in January 2014 that "we don't want them using our brand and promoting policies that people could see as Nationals' policies". Following poor results in the 2014 state election, some members decided to rename the party, the Tasmania Party. However it was instead deregistered in the state.

In May 2018, independent senator Steve Martin joined the Nationals, giving them their first federal representative in the state in ninety years. He had originally stood for the Senate as a Jacqui Lambie Network candidate, before being declared elected on a countback after Jacqui Lambie was found ineligible for election. Martin declared he was seeking to relaunch the party in the state. In October 2018, the re-established party held its first state conference in Launceston, which was attended by the party's federal leader Michael McCormack. At the conference, Martin announced that he would stand for re-election at the 2019 federal election and stated that the party hoped to field additional candidates.

In January 2019, the National Party announced it would field candidates in Bass, Braddon and Lyons at the 2019 election. Martin failed in his bid to win re-election to the Senate, polling just over one percent of the statewide vote. The Nationals performed best in Lyons, where they received 15.7% of the vote following the disendorsement of the Liberal candidate.

The Tasmanian Nationals re-registered with the Tasmanian Electoral Commission in early 2025, with the party's former federal president Christine Ferguson appointed as state secretary. Victorian senator Bridget McKenzie supported the party's revival. In the lead-up to the 2025 Tasmanian state election, it was reported that the Nationals would stand candidates in three out of the five House of Assembly electorates, running on a platform that included opposition to the proposed Macquarie Point Stadium supported by the ALP and Liberal Party. McKenzie launched the party's state election campaign on 12 June 2025, with former Liberal MP John Tucker announced as one of the party's candidates. Former Jacqui Lambie Network MP Andrew Jenner also announced his intention to seek National Party preselection for the seat of Lyons. Miriam Beswick joined the party soon after Jenner. The Party recorded a total vote of 1.6% at the 2025 election, and failed to win any seats.

In September 2025, Hobart City Councillor Louise Elliot joined the Nationals, after being elected in 2022 as an independent member.

== Electoral performance ==
=== House of Assembly ===
Election	Leader	Votes	%	Seats	+/–	Position	Status
1922	Ernest Blyth	9,498	13.98	5 / 30	▲5	▲3rd	Coalition
Did not contest elections between 1925 and 1959
1964		9,280	5.26	0 / 35	Steady	▲3rd	No seats
1969	Kevin Lyons	8,160	4.31	1 / 35	▲1	3rd	Coalition
Did not contest elections between 1972 and 1992
1996		6,476	2.20	0 / 35	Steady	▲4th	No seats
Did not contest elections between 1998 and 2010
2014		2,655	0.81	0 / 25	Steady	▲5th	No seats
Did not contest elections between 2018 and 2024
2025		4,450	1.62	0 / 35	Steady	▲5th	No seats

== See also ==
- Category:National Party of Australia members of the Parliament of Tasmania

== Bibliography ==
- Davey, Paul. Ninety Not Out – The Nationals 1920-2010 (2010)
- Petrow, Stefan: Country Party, The Companion to Tasmanian History (University of Tasmania).
