= David O'Byrne =

Australian politician and trade unionist

The Honourable David O'Byrne MP
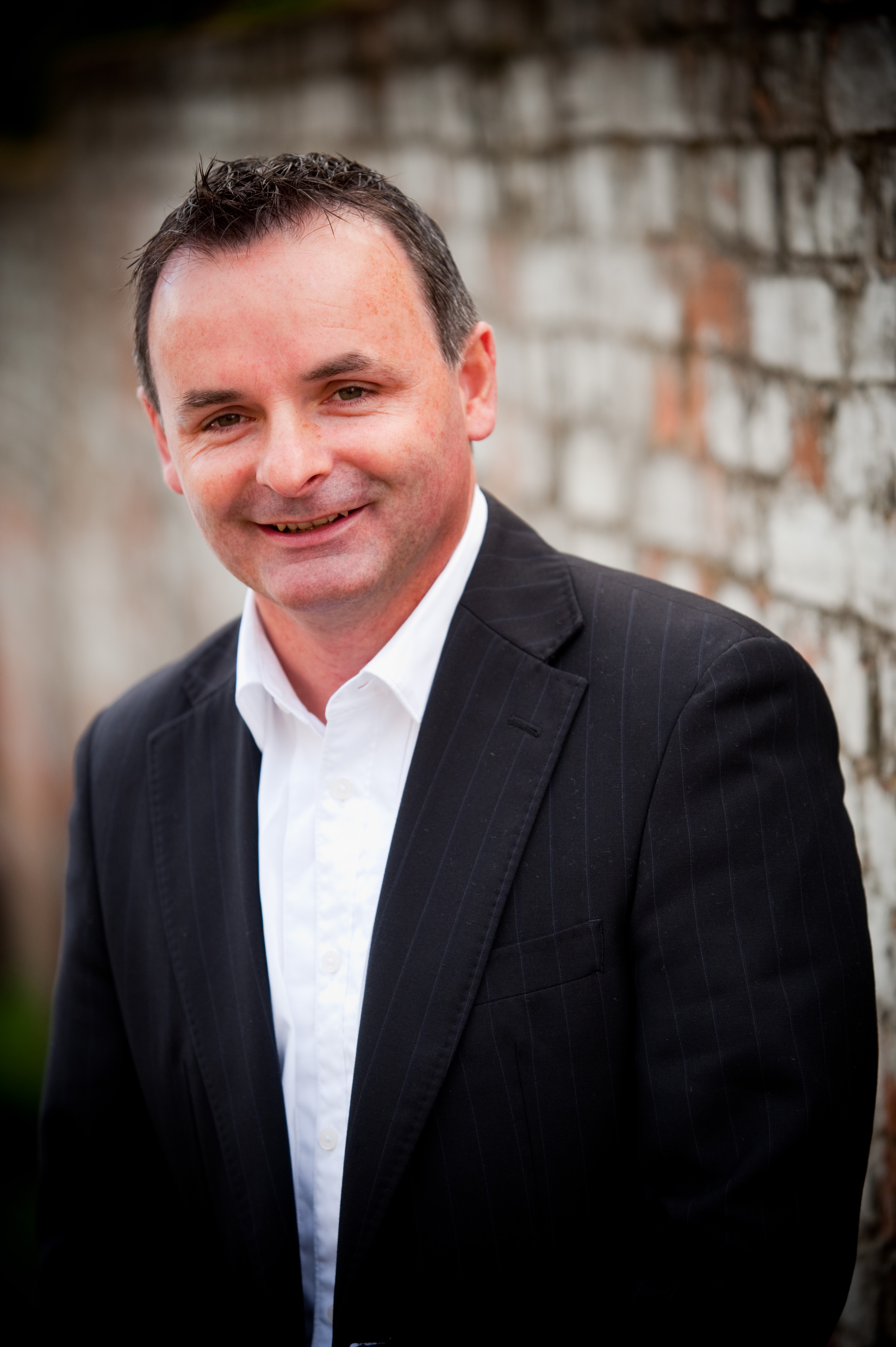

52nd Leader of the Opposition of Tasmania
- In office 15 June 2021 – 7 July 2021
- Premier: Peter Gutwein
- Deputy: Anita Dow
- Preceded by: Rebecca White
- Succeeded by: Rebecca White

Leader of the Tasmanian Labor Party
- In office 15 June 2021 – 7 July 2021
- Deputy: Anita Dow
- Preceded by: Rebecca White
- Succeeded by: Rebecca White

Member of the Tasmanian House of Assembly for Franklin
- Incumbent
- Assumed office 3 March 2018 Serving with 6 others
- Preceded by: Nic Street
- In office 20 March 2010 – 15 March 2014
- Preceded by: Ross Butler
- Succeeded by: Paul Harriss

Personal details
- Born: 17 March 1969 (age 57) Launceston, Tasmania, Australia
- Party: Independent (2024−present)
- Other political affiliations: Labor (2001−2024); Independent Labor (2021−2024); Rockliff government (confidence-and-supply) (2024–)
- Relations: Michelle O’Byrne (sister)
- Education: University of Adelaide
- Website: www.davidobyrne.net

David O'Byrne (born 17 March 1969) is an Australian trade unionist and politician. A prominent union leader prior to entering politics and the brother of former politician Michelle O'Byrne, he has been an independent member of the Tasmanian House of Assembly since 2024, after previously serving as a Labor member from 2010 to 2014 and from 2018 to 2024, representing the electorate of Franklin. He has supported the premiership of Jeremy Rockliff by means of confidence and supply since 2024.

In 2018 O'Byrne was re-elected to the House of Assembly with a strong personal vote, topping the Labor ticket. In May 2021, he was re-elected. In June 2021, O'Byrne replaced Rebecca White as the leader of Tasmanian Labor, winning 74 percent of the vote as against 26 percent for the right-aligned Braddon MP Shane Broad.

In July 2021, O’Byrne resigned the leadership following an allegation of sexual harassment levelled against him by a former union staffer, relating to alleged events in 2007 and 2008.

An independent investigation conducted by Barbara Deegan, a commissioner of the Commonwealth industrial tribunals from 1996 to 2014, found that his actions were "inappropriate" and “wrong”, but did not constitute sexual harassment. No further action was taken, but O'Byrne resigned from the leadership nonetheless, and Rebecca White was elected to succeed him.

From August 2021, O'Byrne sat on the crossbench as an Independent Labor member, until resigning his Labor membership after Labor leader Rebecca White vetoed his preselection. He announced his candidacy as an independent on 4 February 2024.

== Early life & education ==
O'Byrne was born in Launceston, where his father was a painter, and his mother worked as a cleaner. Both his parents were also shop stewards for their unions. O'Byrne studied at the University of Adelaide where he gained a degree in labour studies. He moved to Hobart in 1994.

== Unionism ==
O'Byrne was initially employed by the Health and Community Services Union, and then the Liquor, Hospitality and Miscellaneous Union (LHMU).

He was elected as Tasmanian secretary of the LHMU in 2001 and was re-elected unopposed in 2002 and 2006. He also served as national vice president of the union between 2008 and 2010.

O'Byrne's leadership was marked by successful outcomes of campaigns to get better wages and conditions for childcare workers, casino workers and cleaners. He fought for job security for public school cleaners and grounds-people, as well as for greater recognition for early years professionals. He also played a lead role in the Your Rights at Work Campaign.

While with the LHMU, O'Byrne led the union's campaign to make Tasmania the first state to protect hospitality workers and the public by introducing a ban on smoking in enclosed areas of bars and casinos.

O'Byrne also served as state president of Tasmanian Labor from 2004 to 2006, and senior vice president of Unions Tasmania between 2001 and 2009.

O'Byrne has made significant contributions to the community through his roles as chair of Smoke Free Tasmania, a member of the Ministerial Advisory Council on Child Care, a member of the State Facilitating Group Anti-Poverty Week Organising Committee, as co-chair of the Anti-Poverty Week Organising Committee, as a founding member and chair of the Peace Coalition, a group established to protest against the 2003 invasion of Iraq, and as treasurer of the Tasmanian Peace Trust.

He held leadership positions of national vice president of the LHMU since 2007, senior vice president of Unions Tasmania 2001–2008, ALP state president 2004–2006 and ALP vice president 2001–2004.

=== United Voice national secretary ===
In May 2014, it was announced that O'Byrne would take on the role of national secretary of his former union United Voice. O'Byrne was acting national secretary until September, when it was expected he would be formally elected into the role. He was elected to national secretary at the union's national council meeting held in September.

After commuting from his home in Hobart to Sydney for the role for over a year, with a young family based in Hobart, he made the decision to resign from the position of national secretary to return to live permanently in Tasmania.

== Labor tenure (2010–2014, 2018–2023) ==
O'Byrne was preselected as an endorsed Labor candidate for the Tasmanian House of Assembly electorate of Franklin on 21 July 2009. He was subsequently elected at the 20 March 2010 state election, polling second on the Labor ticket to defeat incumbent Labor MHAs Ross Butler and Daniel Hulme.

O'Byrne's ministerial responsibilities originally encompassed environment, parks and heritage; workplace relations; arts; sport and recreation and the newly created hospitality portfolio. Following a ministerial reshuffle in December 2010, he was promoted to the portfolios of economic development and of infrastructure, whilst retaining the portfolio of workplace relations. In February 2011 he was granted the additional portfolio of innovation, science and technology upon the resignation of Premier David Bartlett, who had held that portfolio. He also assumed the portfolio of police and emergency management shortly thereafter.

O'Byrne lost his seat at the March 2014 election, but was returned to parliament in 2018.

=== Leader of the Opposition (2021) ===
Following the 2021 state election, O'Byrne nominated to lead the Labor Party. Dual nominations for the leadership position sparked a contested ballot of members. On 15 June 2021, O'Byrne was declared to be the successful candidate, with 74% of the vote.

==== Sexual harassment allegations ====
In July 2021, O’Byrne resigned the leadership of the Labor party following an allegation of sexual harassment, relating to alleged events in 2007 and 2008, which was levelled at him by a former union staffer. O’Byrne participated in an investigation conducted by Barbara Deegan, a commissioner of the Commonwealth industrial tribunals from 1996 to 2014. O’Byrne publicly admitted to sending sexually explicit texts to a young staff member, and kissing her. The investigation found that his actions were “inappropriate” and “wrong” but did not constitute sexual harassment. O’Byrne's loss of the Labor leadership made him the shortest-serving Labor leader in Tasmania's history. Much media attention ensued, with former Labor premiers Lara Giddings and Paul Lennon calling for his resignation from parliament.

== Independent tenure (2023–present) ==
O’Byrne's position in the Parliamentary Labor Caucus became untenable after calls for his resignation from Rebecca White, who had resumed the Labor leadership after O'Byrne's departure from the role. Accordingly, O’Byrne resigned from the Parliamentary Labor Caucus on 23 August and moved to the crossbench. However, in 2023, O'Byrne announced he would seek Labor preselection for Franklin at the next election, despite White letting it be known that he would be not welcome in caucus as long as she led the party. The Tasmanian preselection process was being managed by Labor's federal executive following federal intervention in 2022. On 1 December 2023, O'Byrne announced that he had been refused pre-selection by the ALP National Executive, describing it as "devastating news for me."

In August 2023, while in the parliament as an independent on the cross-bench, O'Byrne introduced a private member's bill to amend the Residential Tenancy Act to provide minimum rental standards for social housing tenants in Tasmania. The bill passed through the Legislative Council in October 2023 and represents one of only a handful private members bills originating in the House of Assembly to pass through the Tasmanian Parliament.

O'Byrne was reelected as an independent Member in his own right at the 2024 Tasmanian State Election.

Citing a need for the parliament to be stable in the minority government situation that emerged after the 2024 state election, O'Byrne agreed to provide supply and confidence to premier Jeremy Rockliff by committing to passing the government's budget bills and agreed not to support frivolous no confidence motions. O'Byrne said the understanding that had been reached between himself and premier Jeremy Rockliff would not change or compromise his position on any policy matter, telling the media he would "...still freely vote on all matters based on my values, and in line with the commitments I made to the people of Franklin."

O'Byrne was successfully reelected at the snap 2025 Tasmanian state election, again contesting as an independent member. He offered confidence-and-supply to Jeremy Rockliff for a second parliamentary term on 17 August 2025. He stated that he had tried his hardest to support Labor, but he did not believe that Labor could form a stable and workable government from 10 seats, requiring himself, the Greens, and at least 2 other independents to form a thin majority. It was reported that Rockliff had offered him a position within the executive government cabinet, but O'Byrne turned it down as it would likely be viewed as transactional.

== Not-for-profit role ==
In July 2015, O'Byrne was appointed chief operating officer for the not for profit Beacon Foundation. The foundation, whilst founded and based in Hobart, works with disadvantaged communities in every state across Australia, working to assist schools and industry work together to help young Australians on a positive pathway post secondary education.

== Personal life ==
O'Byrne lives in Hobart with his wife and two daughters.

== See also ==
- Political families of Australia

Political offices
Preceded by Anita Dow (interim)	Leader of the Opposition; 2021	Succeeded by Rebecca White
Party political offices
Preceded by Anita Dow (interim)	Leader of the Labor Party in Tasmania; 2021	Succeeded by Rebecca White
