= Michelle O'Byrne =

Australian politician

The Honourable Ambassador Michelle O'Byrne
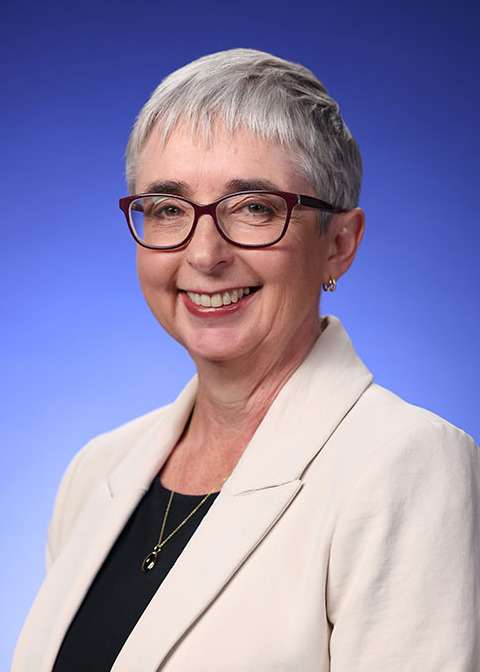

Ambassador for Gender Equality
- Incumbent
- Assumed office 18 August 2025
- Minister: Penny Wong (Foreign Affairs); Katy Gallagher (Women)
- Preceded by: Stephanie Campbell

35th Speaker of the Tasmanian House of Assembly
- In office 14 May 2024 – 19 July 2025
- Premier: Jeremy Rockliff
- Preceded by: Mark Shelton

Deputy Leader of the Tasmanian Labor Party
- In office 31 March 2014 – 15 May 2021
- Leader: Bryan Green; Rebecca White
- Preceded by: Bryan Green
- Succeeded by: Anita Dow

Member of the Tasmanian House of Assembly for Bass
- In office 18 March 2006 – 11 June 2025

Member of the Australian Parliament for Bass
- In office 3 October 1998 – 9 October 2004
- Preceded by: Warwick Smith
- Succeeded by: Michael Ferguson

Personal details
- Born: Michelle Anne O'Byrne; 6 March 1968 (age 58) Launceston, Tasmania, Australia
- Party: Labor
- Spouse: Priam Arumugam
- Relations: David O'Byrne (brother)
- Education: University of Tasmania
- Occupation: Trade unionist, political adviser, Member of State Parliament
- Website: taslabor.org.au/people/michelle-o-byrne/

Michelle Anne O'Byrne (born 6 March 1968) is an Australian politician representing the Labor Party and from 2024 until 2025, served as speaker of the Tasmanian House of Assembly. O'Byrne was elected in the 2006 state election to the Tasmanian House of Assembly in the division of Bass. Prior to her election to state parliament she was a member of the Australian House of Representatives from 1998 to 2004, representing the Division of Bass. Since 2025, she has served as Ambassador for Gender Equality within the federal Department of Foreign Affairs and Trade.

In the 2024 Tasmanian state election, O'Byrne was the second most successful candidate across the state for the Labor Party, receiving 0.95 quotas in her own right in the first preferences alone, only outdone by then-leader, Rebecca White.

O'Byrne announced her retirement from parliament in the 2025 state election.

== Early life ==
O'Byrne was born in Launceston, Tasmania, a grand-niece of a former Labor senator and President of the Senate, Justin O'Byrne. She graduated from the University of Tasmania in 1992, with a Bachelor of Arts in General Studies. She was an organiser for the Liquor, Hospitality and Miscellaneous Union, and electorate officer to Senator Kerry O'Brien before entering politics.

== Federal MP for Bass ==
She won the federal seat of Bass in 1998 (by 78 votes), and again in 2001, but was defeated by her Liberal opponent Michael Ferguson in the 2004 election.

Many put this down to concern about loss of forestry jobs under Labor's environment policy, which had the potential to adversely affect O'Byrne's electorate.

== State MP for Bass ==
After more than a year out of politics, O'Byrne ran as a Labor candidate in the 2006 state election and was easily elected for the state seat of Bass, which covers the same territory as the federal seat. She topped the poll in the five-member electorate, receiving 23.3% of first preferences, helping ensure that Bass was the only seat to record a swing to Labor.

Until the defeat of the Labor government in the 2014 state election, she served in the Tasmanian cabinet as Minister for Health, Children and Sport & Recreation. She served in cabinet with her brother David O'Byrne, one of a very few pairs of siblings to have served in cabinet together anywhere in the world.

Prior to the 2010 election, O'Byrne was Minister for Environment, Parks, Heritage and the Arts, Minister for Tourism and Minister for Sport and Recreation in the Bartlett government.

After 17 years in state parliament, O'Byrne announced in June 2025 she would not seek preselection to contest the 2025 Tasmanian state election “whether it be in weeks or months to come.”

=== Speaker of the House of Assembly ===
O'Byrne was re-elected in Bass at the 2024 election and was elected unopposed to the position of Speaker of the House of Assembly on 14 May 2024, the new parliament's opening day. Her elevation to the position came despite the Labor Party winning only 10 seats at the election and remaining in opposition.

In June 2025, O'Byrne exercised her casting vote as speaker to secure the passage of a no-confidence motion in Premier Jeremy Rockliff, precipitating a snap state election. In parliament she stated "when I was elected to this position, it was made clear to this house and the public that despite no longer attending the caucus and strategy meetings of the Labor Party, that I would always vote with them [...] no-one in this chamber could realistically expect me to provide confidence to a Liberal government".

O'Byrne announced her retirement in 2025.

== Political interests ==
A former National co convener of EMILY's List Australia, O’Byrne worked to increase the number of women in Parliament, and has been responsible for delivering significant legislative reform for women.

O'Byrne is currently the Australian Chair of the Commonwealth Women Parliamentarians who work to increase women's participation in political processes globally.

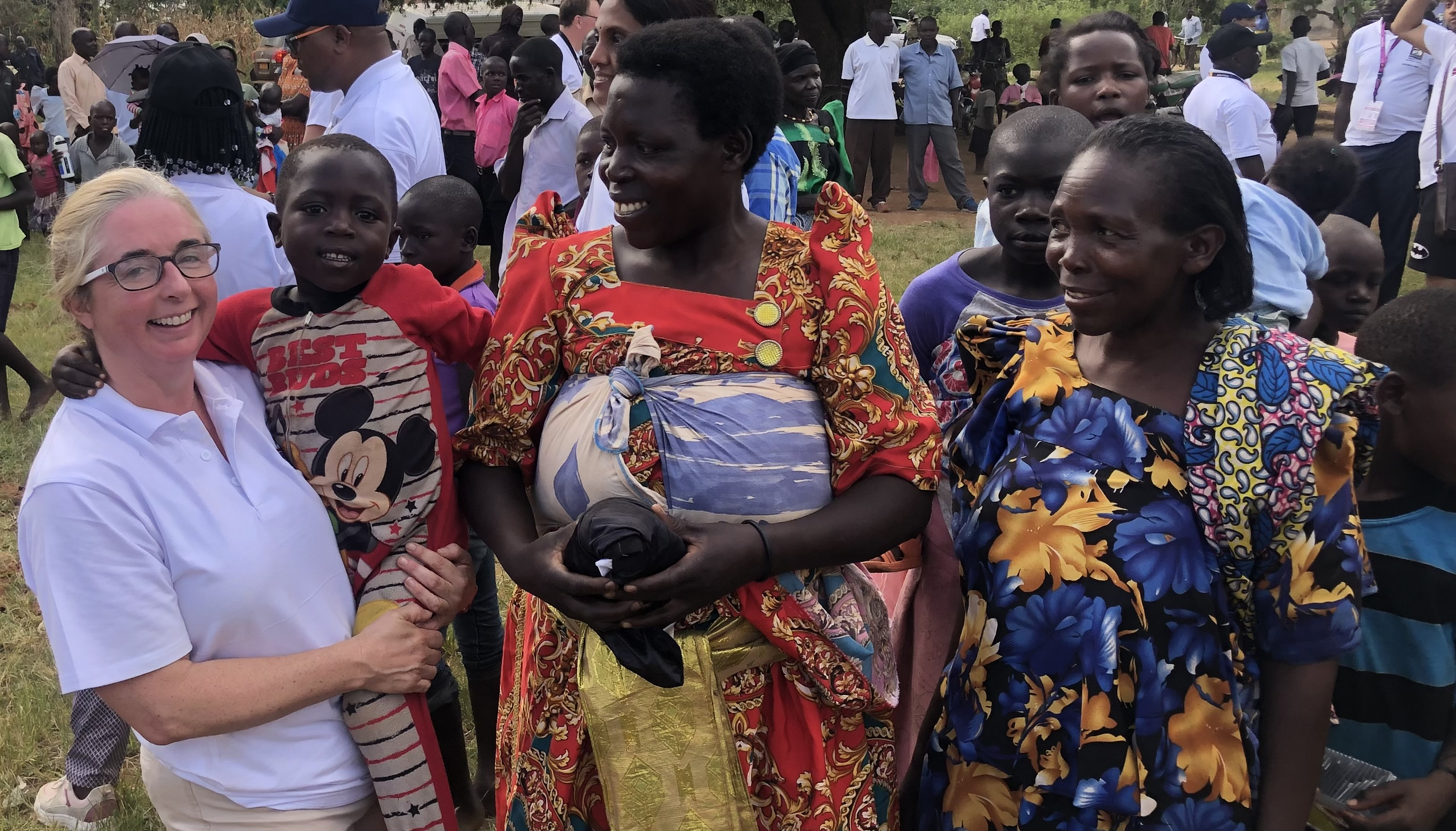

== Personal life ==
She is a Parkrunner, who has taken part in Launceston runs.

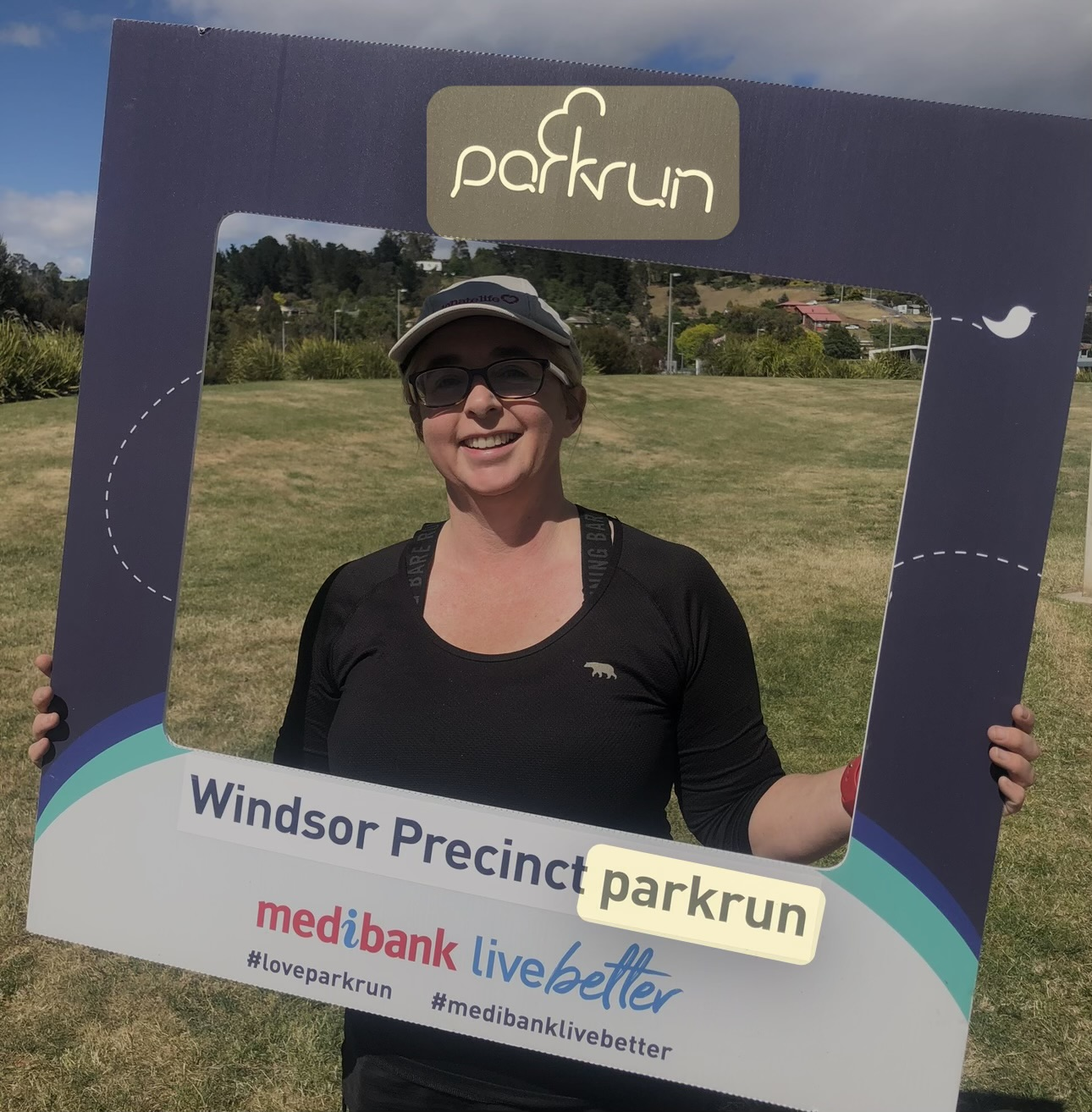
Park Run

O'Byrne and her partner, Priam Arumugam, live in Launceston with their two teenage daughters.

== See also ==
- Political families of Australia

Parliament of Australia
Preceded by Warwick Smith	Member for Bass; 1998–2004	Succeeded by Michael Ferguson
Parliament of Tasmania
Preceded by Mark Shelton	Speaker of the Tasmanian House of Assembly; 2024–2025	Succeeded by Jacquie Petrusma
