= Jacqui Lambie Network =

Australian political party

- Abbreviation: JLN
- President: Jacqui Lambie
- Leader: Jacqui Lambie
- Secretary: Chris Hannan
- Founded: 14 May 2015; 11 years ago
- Split from: Palmer United Party
- Headquarters: Shop 4, 22 Mount Street, Burnie, Tasmania
- Ideology: Populism; Social conservatism
- Political position: Big tent
- Colours: Gold
- House of Representatives: 0 / 5 (Tas. seats)
- Senate: 1 / 12 (Tas. seats)
- Circular Head Council: 1 / 9

Website
- lambienetwork.com.au

The Jacqui Lambie Network (JLN) is an Australian political party founded in 2015 by Jacqui Lambie, at the time sitting as an independent senator for Tasmania.

The JLN has contested multiple federal and Tasmanian state elections since its creation, running candidates in support of Lambie's populist stances and advocacy for working class "battlers", especially welfare recipients. Lambie was re-elected to the Senate at the 2016, 2019 and 2025 federal elections.

Lambie's former staffer Tammy Tyrrell was also elected to the Senate on the JLN ticket at the 2022 election, but resigned to sit as an independent in 2024 after falling out with Lambie. The party also elected three members of the Tasmanian House of Assembly at the 2024 state election, but they also left or were expelled from the party within a short period.

== History ==
=== Federal politics ===
The JLN was formed to allow Lambie to re-contest her Senate seat at the 2016 federal election, after she resigned from the Palmer United Party in November 2014. It gained 8.3% of the Senate popular vote in Tasmania in 2016, slightly increasing its vote share to 8.9% at the 2019 election.

In November 2017, Lambie was revealed to hold Australian-British dual citizenship, having inherited British citizenship from her Scottish-born father. As part of the parliamentary eligibility crisis, she announced her resignation on 14 November 2017. After a recount, she was replaced by Devonport Mayor Steve Martin, who had been second on the JLN ticket in the 2016 federal election.

He survived a challenge to his own eligibility, on a different constitutional ground, but refused to step down so as to create a casual Senate vacancy to which Lambie could be appointed. Lambie later expelled him from the party for disloyalty.

Tammy Tyrrell was selected as the lead candidate on the Jacqui Lambie Network's Senate ticket for the 2022 federal election, and was elected at that election. On 28 March 2024, Tyrrell announced she would resign from the JLN to sit as an independent, saying that Lambie was "not happy" with the way she was representing the party. On 1 August 2024, after an interview on ABC Radio Hobart where Jacqui Lambie stated she did not know why Tyrrell left, Tyrrell stated that Lambie had told her to leave.

=== Tasmanian state politics ===
==== 2018 election ====
The JLN ran 12 candidates in the 2018 Tasmanian state election, in the electorates of Lyons, Braddon and Bass.

After a pre-election refusal from Tasmanian Labor and the Tasmanian Liberals to negotiate with minor parties to form government in a possible hung parliament scenario, Lambie called the matter a 'slap in the face.'

After the election no JLN candidate won a seat, with the highest-first-preference candidate, Mayor of Spring Bay Michael Kent winning around 2,000 first-preference votes, being eliminated in one of the final counts. Kent's preferences largely benefited Liberal candidates.

==== 2021 election ====
The Jacqui Lambie Network chose not to contest the 2021 Tasmanian state election, despite being a registered state party.

==== 2024 election ====
Jacqui Lambie announced that she would be putting forward candidates for the 2024 Tasmanian state election. In this election, the JLN won seats in the Tasmanian House of Assembly for the first time, with the party contested all seats except for Clark. Three candidates were elected; Andrew Jenner in Lyons, Rebekah Pentland in Bass, and Miriam Beswick in Braddon.

On 10 April 2024, a confidence and supply agreement was reached with the minority Liberal government. This deal was criticised by current and former state MPs for rendering the party incapable of being independent.

The three elected JLN state members were reported to have issued a "butt out" legal notice to Jacqui Lambie in July 2024. It was claimed she was directing them how to vote.

On 16 August 2024, Jacqui Lambie issued a statement demanding Michael Ferguson resigns from the Tasmanian executive government, despite her MPs keeping the party in government. On 20 August 2024, JLN Members Rebekah Pentland and Andrew Jenner were interviewed on ABC Hobart's morning programme, where Andrew Jenner agreed with Jacqui Lambie's call to remove Michael Ferguson as treasurer. In the same interview, Rebekah Pentland stated she found Jacqui Lambie's interference in Tasmanian State Parliament, "not very helpful'.

On 24 August 2024, Rebekah Pentland and Miriam Beswick were expelled from the party, remaining in parliament as independents . The party then had one MP, Andrew Jenner.

Following the expulsion of Pentland and Beswick, In August 2024, Lambie announced she would not run candidates in Tasmanian state elections in the future. She also apologised to Premier Jeremy Rockliff for government instability after her party 'imploded'. As a result, sole JLN MP Jenner, who intended to run in the July 2025 snap election, had to run as an independent candidate, before later joining the Tasmanian National Party.

== Policies ==
While announcing the formation of the party, Lambie revealed the party's 12 "core beliefs", including establishing a national apprentice, trade and traineeship system incorporating both the Australian Defence Force and TAFEs, dedicated Indigenous seats in parliament, and supporting the introduction of a carbon tax.

=== Nationalism and views on Islam ===
Early in her political career, Lambie promoted firm nationalist sentiments, first in opposition to Sharia law, and more recently about "Chinese foreign interference". In an interview with ABC News in 2018, Lambie distanced herself from her previous views on Sharia law, stating she did not want to "cause division", and was influenced by "a previous advisor that was really driving that in".

On 22 August 2024, Lambie was accused by fellow Senator Mehreen Faruqi of vilifying Muslims during a parliamentary debate over Australia's granting of visas for Gazans. "I had to sit here and listen to Senator [Jacqui] Lambie attack and vilify Muslims and she couldn’t even pronounce my name", she claimed on SBS News.

=== Royal commission into veteran suicide ===
In response to a Change.org petition organised by Julie-Ann Finney, whose son David Finney killed himself after a crippling battle with post-traumatic stress injury, Lambie has called for a royal commission into veteran suicide.

The Morrison Government announced their intention to appoint a National Commissioner for Defence and Veteran Suicide Prevention to inquire into the deaths by suicide of serving and former ADF members.

Lambie criticised the Government's plan in a dissenting report, noting that "The families of veterans who have taken their own lives support a Royal Commission. The institutions who are being blamed for those suicides support a National Commissioner."

On 8 July 2021, a Royal Commission into Defence and Veteran Suicide in Australia was established.

=== Political donations ===
Lambie introduced a bill to the Australian Senate in February 2020 that proposes to tighten political donations laws. The bill seeks to amend current laws that permit political donations under $14,300 to not be disclosed. Lambie has proposed lowering this threshold to $2,500. The bill also proposes to introduce electoral expenditure accounts for organisations that run political campaigns.

=== Australian manufacturing ===
In early 2020, Lambie started a campaign to support Australian manufacturing with concerns about Australia's reliance on foreign imported products; she believes these concerns are a threat to Australia's economic sovereignty; magnified with the advent of COVID-19.

=== Foreign interference ===
Lambie has said on her website "It’s about time that the people in Parliament woke up to China’s attempts to infiltrate our economy and our democracy."

=== Taxation ===
Upon its application to register as a political party in 2015, it was described that the party would "favour the introduction of a financial transactions tax".

=== Macquarie Point Stadium ===
The Jacqui Lambie Network does not support the construction of the planned $1bn stadium at Macquarie Point – instead supporting further upgrades to a Launceston stadium. Lambie has demanded that Premier Jeremy Rockliff resign over the issue.

== Board ==
The party's board was unknown until 1 August 2024, when it was disclosed by Lambie in an interview on ABC Radio Hobart.

Lambie has served as party president since July 2024, while former Tasmanian state election candidate Chris Hannan is the secretary, former RSL New South Wales chief executive and JLN NSW senate candidate Glenn Kolomeitz is treasurer and Ian Basckin also serves on the board.

== Elected representatives ==
=== Current ===
==== Federal ====
- Jacqui Lambie, Senator for Tasmania (2015–2017; 2019–present)

==== Local ====
- Rodney Flowers, Councillor for the Circular Head (2022–present)

=== Former ===
==== Federal ====
- Steve Martin, Senator for Tasmania (2018–2019; left JLN in 2018)
- Tammy Tyrrell, Senator for Tasmania (2022–present; left JLN in 2024)

==== State ====
- Miriam Beswick, Member for Braddon (March–August 2024; expelled from the JLN in August 2024)
- Rebekah Pentland, Member for Bass (March–August 2024; expelled from the JLN in August 2024)
- Andrew Jenner, Member for Lyons (2024–2025; left JLN in 2025)

==== Local ====
- Michael Kent AM, Mayor of Glamorgan-Spring Bay (2014–2018; died in 2018)

== Election results ==
At the 2016 federal election, the Jacqui Lambie Network fielded 10 candidates for the Senate (three each in Tasmania and New South Wales, and two each in Queensland and Victoria) but no candidates for seats in the House of Representatives.

The Jacqui Lambie Network selected candidates from SA, NSW and Queensland to run in the 2025 Australian federal election.

=== Federal Parliament ===
Senate
Election year	# of overall votes	% of overall vote	# of overall seats won	# of overall seats	+/–	Status
2016	69,074	0.50 (#17)	1 / 76	1 / 76	▲1	Crossbench
2019	31,383	0.21 (#28)	1 / 40	1 / 76	Steady	Crossbench
2022	23,273	0.27 (#28)	1 / 40	2 / 76	▲1	Crossbench
2025	166,085	1.05 (#9)	1 / 40	1 / 76	Steady	Crossbench

=== Tasmanian Parliament ===
House of Assembly
Election year	# of overall votes	% of overall vote	# of overall seats won	# of overall seats	+/–	Status
2018	10,579	3.16 (#4)	0 / 25	0 / 25	Steady	Extra-parliamentary
2021	Did not contest					
2024	21,378	6.75 (#4)	3 / 35	3 / 35	▲3	Crossbench (With confidence and supply)
2025	Did not contest					

== See also ==
- Personalist party
- Valence populism
