= Rebekah Pentland =

Australian politician

Member of the Tasmanian House of Assembly for Bass
- In office 23 March 2024 – 19 July 2025

Personal details
- Born: 20 February 1978 (age 48) Sydney, New South Wales, Australia
- Party: Independent (since 2024)
- Other political affiliations: Jacqui Lambie Network (until 2024)
- Website: lambienetwork.com.au/pages/rebekahpentland

Rebekah Samantha Pentland (born 20 February 1978) is a former Australian politician, having served as one of seven members for Bass in the Tasmanian House of Assembly, and was defeated in the 2025 state election.

== Career ==
Pentland is a pharmaceutical business consultant.

== Political career ==
In the 2024 Tasmanian state election she was elected in Bass.

In August 2024, she and Miriam Beswick were expelled from the Jacqui Lambie Network.

In the 2025 Tasmanian state election, she stood as an independent, and was defeated.

== Personal life ==
Pentland lives in Youngtown with her three children.
