= Rosalie Woodruff =

Australian politician and epidemiologist

Rosalie Woodruff MP
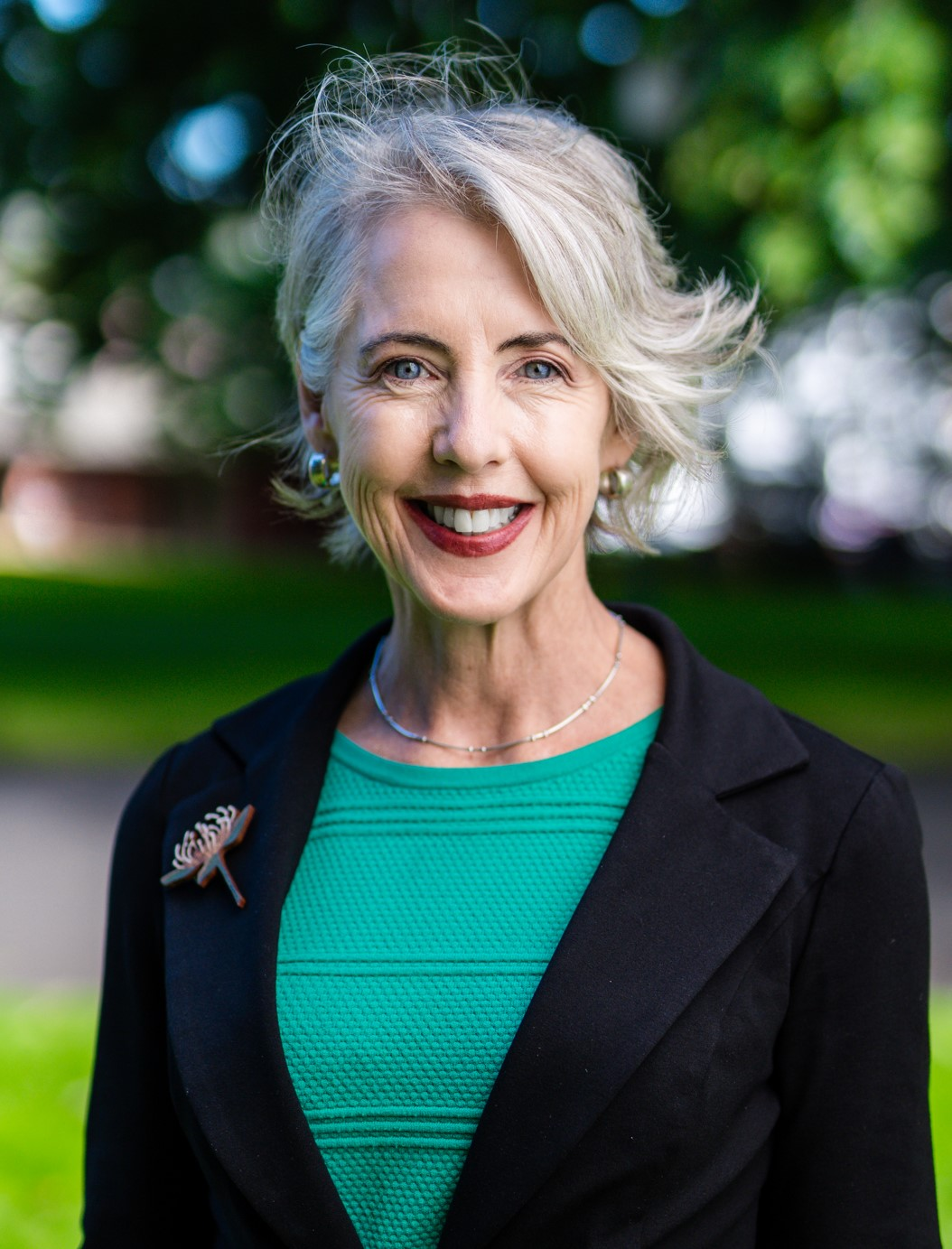
- Woodruff in 2023

Leader of the Tasmanian Greens
- Incumbent
- Assumed office 13 July 2023
- Deputy: Vica Bayley
- Preceded by: Cassy O'Connor

Member of the Tasmanian House of Assembly for Franklin
- Incumbent
- Assumed office 17 August 2015 Serving with 6 others
- Preceded by: Nick McKim

Personal details
- Born: 1964 or 1965 (age 61–62)
- Party: Greens
- Domestic partner: Paul Gibson
- Children: Two daughters
- Education: Australian National University; University of Canberra
- Profession: Epidemiologist
- Website: https://tasgreensmps.org

Rosalie Ellen Woodruff is an Australian epidemiologist and politician who serves as the current leader of the Tasmanian Greens. She has represented Franklin in the Tasmanian House of Assembly since 17 August 2015, when she was elected in a count back to replace Nick McKim.

== Education ==
Woodruff holds a Bachelor of Arts in professional writing from the University of Canberra, as well as a Master of Public Health and PhD in epidemiology from the Australian National University, on the topic of climate and environment as predictors for Ross River Virus.

After living in the ACT, she relocated to Tasmania with her partner in 2007.

== Political career ==
Woodruff has previously contested the federal seat of Franklin for the Australian Greens at the 2013 federal election, and again, at the state level in the 2014 Tasmanian election. Prior to entering parliament, she served as a councillor for the Huon Valley Council from 2009.

Woodruff was elected to state Parliament in 2015 following a Hare-Clark count back triggered by previous incumbent Nick McKim's resignation to fill a senate vacancy created by the retirement of Christine Milne.

=== Tasmanian Greens Leader ===
Following the resignation of Cassy O'Connor as leader of the Tasmanian Greens, and from the Tasmanian House of Assembly on 13 July 2023, Woodruff became acting Greens Leader. With the election of Vica Bayley on 1 August 2023 to the seat of Clark for the Greens via a count back, Woodruff was confirmed as leader of the Tasmanian Greens.

Woodruff lead the party to the 2024 Tasmanian State Election, the first held after the House of Assembly was restored to its original size of 35 seats, up from 25. Under her leadership, the party increase its representation in the House Of Assembly from two to five members. Woodruff was re-elected at the snap 2025 Tasmanian state election.

Woodruff moved a censure motion on Liberal Premier Jeremy Rockliff, which passed the House of Assembly on 17 June 2026 with support of the Labor Opposition, and several independent members. With the motion passing, Rockliff is the first Tasmanian Premier to be censured by parliament.

In October 2026, Woodruff announced she planned on contesting the next Tasmanian State Election in the seat of Clark, following the redistribution of Tasmania’s five electorates.

Party political offices
Preceded by Cassy O'Connor	Leader of the Tasmanian Greens; 2023–present	Incumbent
