= Andrew Jenner =

Australian politician

Member of the Tasmanian House of Assembly for Lyons
- In office 23 March 2024 – 19 July 2025

Member of the Windsor and Maidenhead Borough Council for Maidenhead Riverside Ward
- In office 2000–2016

Mayor of the Royal Borough of Windsor and Maidenhead
- In office 2013–2014

Deputy Mayor of the Royal Borough of Windsor and Maidenhead
- In office 2012–2013

Personal details
- Party: National (2025–present)
- Other political affiliations: Conservative Party (UK) (until 2016); Independent (2016–24); Jacqui Lambie Network (2024–25)
- Website: lambienetwork.com.au/pages/andrewjenner

Andrew Jenner is a former British-Australian politician, having represented the division of Lyons in the Tasmanian House of Assembly. From 2024 to 2025, he represented the Jacqui Lambie Network, before joining the Tasmanian National Party prior to the 2025 election.

Jenner was defeated at the 2025 Tasmanian state election.

== Political career ==
Jenner served as mayor of the Royal Borough of Windsor and Maidenhead in Berkshire, England from 2013 to 2014 and Deputy Mayor from 2012 before that. Jenner was the owner of Jenner's Cafe in Maidenhead. In England, he also served as a magistrate (a volunteer role unlike legally qualified magistrates in Australia). Jenner was a Conservative Party councillor for Maidenhead Riverside ward. In 2016, he resigned as councillor to emigrate to Australia.

In the 2022 Tasmanian local elections, Jenner was an independent candidate for Clarence City Council. In the 2024 Tasmanian state election he was elected in Lyons for the Jacqui Lambie Network.

On 16 September 2024, the sole remaining member of the JLN in parliament, Andrew Jenner, confirmed he was not signing a confidence and supply deal with the Liberal government after the last one fell through. In 2025, Jenner voted with the Labor opposition in the vote of no confidence on premier Jeremy Rockliff, which resulted in a snap election.

JLN announced in August 2024 that they would not be endorsing candidates in the following state election. When a snap election was called to be held in July 2025, Jenner stated he intended to run in the election but could not run under the JLN banner. He announced on 14 June 2025 that he had joined the National Party and would seek preselection for the state election.
