= Nic Street =

Australian politician

The Honourable Nic Street

Member of the Tasmanian House of Assembly for Franklin
- In office 6 February 2020 – 19 July 2025
- Preceded by: Will Hodgman
- Succeeded by: Peter George
- In office 3 March 2016 – 3 March 2018
- Preceded by: Paul Harriss

Personal details
- Born: Nicholas Adam Street; 1979 (age 46–47) Tasmania, Australia
- Party: Liberal Party
- Education: University of Tasmania
- Occupation: Supermarket operator

For the Canadian road, see Nicholas Street Nicholas Adam Street (born 1979) is an Australian politician. He was elected to the Tasmanian House of Assembly in a countback conducted on 1 March 2016, to fill a vacancy caused by the resignation of Paul Harriss, and served until his defeat at the 2018 state election. He was then re-elected on 6 February 2020, filling a vacancy caused by the resignation of Will Hodgman.

Street graduated from the University of Tasmania in 2001 with a Bachelor of Commerce degree, and then operated his family's business, an IGA supermarket in Blackmans Bay. In November 2011, he was elected to Kingborough Council.

In February 2015 and again in February 2016, Street apologised for a post on Twitter made in November 2014 in which he called a fellow passenger on a flight from Hobart to Melbourne a "bitch" for reclining her seat, and included a hashtag "#shouldhavegotasmacktothehead". Street had deleted the tweet after a complaint from a Kingborough ratepayer, and undertook to work hard for the people of Franklin to demonstrate he was "better than one regrettable tweet".

Street contested the Legislative Council seat of Nelson for the Liberals at the 2019 periodic election. He received the highest number of first-preference votes (23.7 per cent), but was defeated on preferences by third-placed independent candidate Meg Webb. On 6 February 2020, Street was re-elected to Franklin in a countback to fill the vacancy caused by the resignation of Will Hodgman.

Street was appointed Minister for Sport and Recreation, Minister for Heritage, Minister for Science and Technology and Minister for Community Services and Development in February 2022.
