= Macquarie Point Stadium =

Proposed stadium in Hobart, Tasmania, Australia

- Render of the proposed Macquarie Point Stadium.
- Interactive map of Macquarie Point Stadium
- Address: Macquarie Point, Hobart, Tasmania, Australia
- Coordinates: 42°52′46.17″S 147°20′11.05″E
- Owner: Tasmanian Government
- Operator: Stadiums Tasmania
- Capacity: 24,500 (sports mode; including 1,500 standing room); 31,500 (concerts)
- Type: Multi-purpose stadium
- Roof: Domed
- Surface: Grass
- Field shape: Oval
- Public transit: Buses Ferries

Construction
- Groundbreaking: 27 July 2026
- Opened: 2031 (scheduled)
- Cost: $1.13 billion AUD

Tenants
- Tasmania Football Club (AFL/AFLW) (2031-onwards); Hobart Hurricanes (BBL) (2031-onwards); Hobart Hurricanes (WBBL) (2031-onwards); Australia Men's National Cricket Team (2031-onwards); Australia Women's National Cricket Team (2031-onwards)

Website
- www.macpoint.com/stadium

Macquarie Point Stadium is a multi-purpose domed stadium to be constructed at Macquarie Point in Hobart, the capital city of Tasmania, Australia. The stadium will be primarily used for Australian rules football and cricket as the home ground of the Tasmania Football Club in the Australian Football League (AFL) and the Hobart Hurricanes in the Big Bash League (BBL). The stadium is likely to host other sports such as rugby league, rugby union and soccer, as well as multi-sporting events.

The stadium forms part of an agreement between the Tasmanian Government and the Australian Football League (AFL) to establish a Tasmanian-based AFL team. The stadium will have a reported construction cost of $1.13 billion AUD and begun construction in July 2026. Originally scheduled for completion in 2029, the stadium is expected to be completed in late 2030 or early 2031.

== AFL deal and site selection ==
The original proposal for a new AFL stadium in Hobart was announced by Premier Peter Gutwein during his March 2022 State of the State address, positioning it as a key requirement in securing a Tasmanian-based Australian Football League (AFL) team. However, in a 2023 interview with ABC News, Gutwein stated there was no pressure from the AFL to build a stadium.

Gutwein's proposal located the stadium at Regatta Point with a $750 million price tag, and envisioned a venue with a retractable roof, permanent seating for 27,000 spectators, and a total capacity of 30,000 for major events and concerts.

The proposal to construct a stadium at Macquarie Point emerged from negotiations between the AFL and the Tasmanian Government as part of the establishment of a Tasmanian AFL team. In 2022, the AFL agreed to work with the state on a model for a team, with the expectation that it would include the development of a new stadium.

The Tasmanian Government subsequently commissioned a site selection study. The primary sites considered were Regatta Point and Macquarie Point, with Macquarie Point confirmed as the preferred location in September 2022.

AFL CEO Gillon McLachlan formally announced the team's admission to the AFL at North Hobart Oval on 3 May 2023, with the men's team joining the Australian Football League from its 2028 season, and the timeline for its AFL Women's team to be developed later. On the same day, the Tasmanian Government signed a Club Funding and Development Agreement with the AFL, containing a financial pathway in establishing the Tasmanian-based AFL and AFLW Club, (Note: The AFL has pledged $358 million toward the establishment of a Tasmanian team. This includes $210 million over 12 years in direct club funding for the Tasmania Devils, covering men’s and women’s player payments as well as general club operations. An additional $123 million over 15 years will support game development in Tasmania (a 60% increase on the AFL's current investment) targeting community football, Auskick programs, and talent pathways. The funding package also includes $10 million for the Kingborough High Performance Centre and a $15 million contribution to the construction of the Macquarie Point Stadium.) as well as requirements surrounding the construction of a new purpose-built stadium at Macquarie Point including:

- Seating of 23,000, expandable to 30,000 and adaptable to different types of events, including both circular and rectangular configurations.
- A fixed, translucent roof.
- AFL standard and contemporary media facilities.

The agreement outlines financial contributions toward the stadium construction and operations:

- $15m from the AFL toward the construction of the stadium.
- $460m from the Tasmanian Government. (Note: The Tasmanian Government's total funding commitment to the stadium is $460 million, comprising $375 million in direct investment and an additional $85 million to be raised through borrowings secured against the sale or lease of land for commercial development.)
- $240m from the Federal Government.
- Ongoing funding of $12m annually over 12 years by the Tasmanian Government.

The agreement further outlines that the Tasmanian Government is solely responsible for any cost overruns associated with the stadium construction, as well as penalties for failure to meet 2 to 3 staged completion dates of $4.5m each time paid to the AFL. The AFL retains the right to terminate the Tasmanian licence or waive the stadium requirement if the government withdraws stadium funding.

== Stadium design ==
In July 2024, Cox Architecture released concept designs for a 23,000-seat multipurpose stadium at Macquarie Point in Hobart. The design includes a 1,500-person conference facility and prioritises universal accessibility, with a continuous internal concourse providing step-free access throughout the venue. The project team comprises Cox Architecture in partnership with local practice Cumulus Studio, engineering firms Aecom and Schlaich Bergermann Partner, and the Macquarie Point Development Corporation. Construction is expected to commence in late 2025, with the stadium scheduled to open ahead of the 2029 AFL season.

=== Roof ===
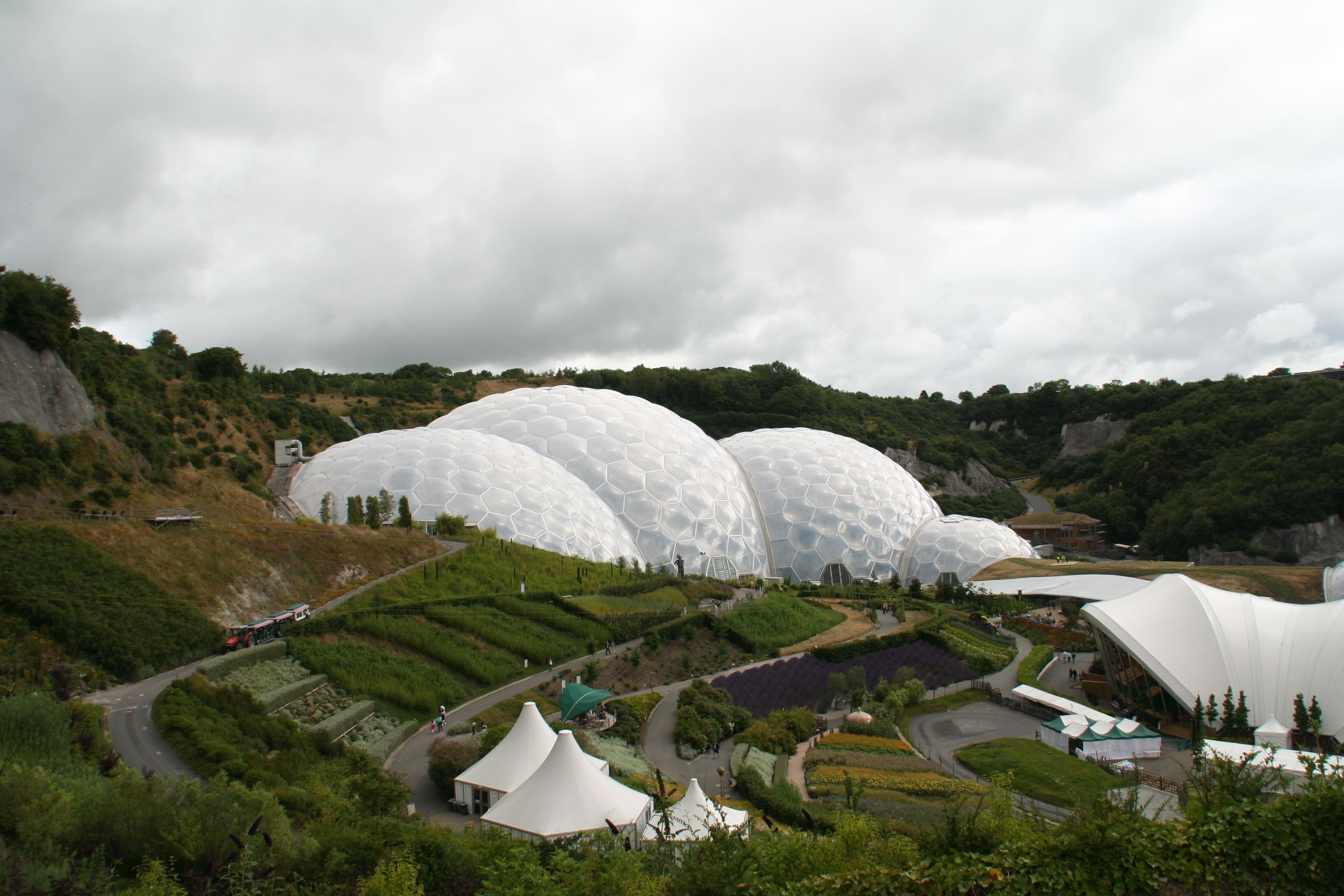
The Eden Project in England, whose biomes use ETFE cushions similar to those proposed at Macquarie Point.

The roof design for the Macquarie Point Stadium is conceived as a translucent, fully enclosed dome, using ETFE (ethylene tetrafluoroethylene) as the primary cladding material. It is supported by a hybrid structural system of steel and Tasmanian-sourced laminated timber (glulam), intended to showcase local materials and sustainable construction practices. The roof is the most expensive component of the stadium development. Initially budgeted at $190 million, its cost was later revised to $207 million in early 2025.

The structure's transparent form is also intended to soften the stadium's visual impact on the Hobart waterfront, particularly in relation to the nearby Hobart Cenotaph and Queen's Domain. In practical terms, the enclosed roof is designed to allow the stadium to host events in all weather conditions.

If completed as planned, the stadium will be the largest timber-roofed sporting venue in the world. The roof height is designed to peak at 51 m (167 ft) and taper to 22.5 m (74 ft), with a final internal clearance of 54 m (177 ft) (RL) to accommodate international cricket.

==== Test cricket play ====
Cricket has previously been played under a roof at Melbourne's Docklands Stadium, which has hosted domestic Twenty20 and One Day International fixtures. (Note: Venue-specific constraints at Docklands Stadium have required rule modifications, including a 2023 change in the Big Bash League that removed the automatic six for roof strikes, instead allowing umpires to determine the outcome.) However, the venue is not approved for Test cricket due to lighting conditions and fixed roof height limitations.

These limitations informed the approach taken in the design of Macquarie Point Stadium. Its roof geometry and internal volume were developed in consultation with Cricket Tasmania and tested using Hawk-Eye ball-tracking technology to ensure the vertical trajectory of a cricket ball could be accommodated, with the goal of enabling indoor Test cricket for the first time.

Despite these efforts, in early 2025 both Cricket Australia and Cricket Tasmania expressed "significant concerns" about the proposed fixed roof, including the potential for shadows to impact visibility and the conduct of play. In May, Cricket Australia formally rejected the enclosed roof design, indicating a preference for a roofless or retractable alternative and stating that national matches would continue at Ninja Stadium unless the design is altered.

In June 2025, the Tasmanian Premier announced a "heads of agreement" with cricket authorities to explore a revised roof solution, aiming to ensure the stadium can host future cricket matches at the national level.

=== Exterior ===
The stadium's façade design incorporates woven patterns inspired by Palawa (Tasmanian Aboriginal) cultural traditions, referencing the region's Indigenous heritage. It also draws on the site's maritime and industrial history through its materials and form.

== Proposed events ==
=== Sports events ===
The proposed anchor tenant for Macquarie Point Stadium is the Tasmania Football Club. Under the stadium's usage model, the club's AFL (Men's) team is expected to play seven home matches per season at the venue, with four additional matches hosted at York Park in Launceston. The financial model assumes an average attendance of 20,825. The stadium is also expected to host three AFL Women's (AFLW) matches annually, with projected crowds of approximately 4,900.

The venue is also intended to accommodate cricket during the summer season. (Note: During the design phase, Cricket Australia and Cricket Tasmania raised concerns about potential shading on the pitch from roof supports. These concerns were addressed through design modifications aimed at reducing shadow impacts and maintaining suitability for professional-level play.) Cricket fixtures proposed in the financial model include one annual Test match (played over five days), one men's and one women's ODI or Twenty20 match, four Big Bash League games, and four Women's Big Bash League games. The venue is under consideration as a future home ground for the Hobart Hurricanes men's and women's teams, and may also serve as a summer venue for the Tasmanian Tigers in domestic competitions such as the Sheffield Shield and national one-day tournaments.

Earlier concept plans included movable lower-tier seating to accommodate rectangular field sports such as rugby and soccer, aiming to improve sightlines and spectator experience. This feature was not retained in the final design. Nonetheless, planning documents include a variety of rugby and soccer events, including matches from the National Rugby League, NRL Women's Premiership, State of Origin, and Super Rugby Pacific, as well as potential international fixtures featuring the Wallabies and Wallaroos. Discussions have also included the possibility of hosting A-League Men's and A-League Women's matches, along with international matches for the Socceroos and Matildas.

Event type	Frequency	Expected average attendance	Notes
AFL matches	7 per season	20,825	Home games for the Tasmania Football Club.
AFLW matches	3 per season	4,900	Home games for the Tasmania Football Club (AFLW).
BBL & WBBL matches	4 per season	10,413	Potential home ground for the Hobart Hurricanes men's and women's teams, subject to approval from Cricket Australia.
Test cricket	1–4 years	14,088	
Men's ODI & T20 cricket	1–2 years	15,313	
Women's ODI & T20 cricket	1–2 years	15,313	
A-League match	1 per season	8,575	
Socceroos match	1–4 years	22,050	
Matildas match	1–4 years	22,050	
NRL match	1 per season	17,763	
NRLW match	1 per season	17,763	
State of Origin match	1–5 years	–	
Super Rugby Pacific match	1 per season	–	
Wallabies match	1–4 years	–	
Wallaroos match	1–4 years	–	

=== Concerts and live music ===
The stadium is also intended to serve as a premier venue for concerts and live music events. The plans indicate a concert capacity of 31,500 (including tiered seating and the field area) as well as a dedicated stage pocket and outside broadcast area in the northern stand. The planning application suggests the venue could hold 1-2 "full stadium" concerts, and 1-4 smaller "arena" concerts annually.

Geoff Jones, CEO of Ticketek parent company TEG, said the venue could "easily" draw 15,000 attendees and support tours from acts like Iron Maiden. Brendan Self of Vandemonian Tours suggested it would fill a long-standing gap in Tasmania's concert infrastructure as Tasmania is often overlooked for international tours.

Leigh Carmichael, then the creative director of Dark Mofo, noted that it was difficult to attract major international artists to the festival due to Hobart's lack of suitably scaled facilities. He stressed that transport and tourism infrastructure, like light rail to Hobart's northern suburbs, should accompany the stadium to support large-scale events.

Former promoter Charles Touber warned that attracting global artists without significant financial support is "an exercise in fantasy."

=== Conferences and other events ===
The stadium's design includes a 1,500-seat function and conference room within the western stand, offering views of both the playing field and externally towards Mount Wellington.

Business Events Tasmania CEO Marnie Craig highlighted that Hobart's current largest conferencing venue accommodates 1,100 delegates, and the new stadium would increase this capacity to 1,500, enabling the city to attract larger national and international conferences and bid for an additional 110 conferences per year. The stadium's proximity to Hobart's waterfront further enhances its appeal for event organisers.

The economic impact assessment projects the venue will host 40 major conferences and 260 smaller functions, contributing an estimated $2.2 million in annual profits.

== Economics ==
Stadium projects are often compared to other forms of public infrastructure, such as roads or bridges, which may not generate direct revenue but are argued to contribute to broader economic activity and community benefit.

The Tasmanian Government's economic case for the Macquarie Point Stadium centres on its potential role in catalysing urban renewal, expanding the visitor economy, and supporting employment growth, alongside meeting the conditions required to secure an AFL team licence. Premier Jeremy Rockliff described the stadium as a foundational element for broader development, stating: “When it comes to the visitor economy, when it comes to hotels, pubs, clubs, cafés, you need the enabler… And the enabler is the stadium.”

An economic impact assessment commissioned by Hobart City Council and prepared by AEC Group projected that the stadium would stimulate A$143,300,000 in economic activity during construction, contribute A$65,400,000 to gross regional product (GRP), and generate A$44,700,000 in household incomes alongside 385 full-time equivalent (FTE) jobs. Following completion, it was estimated the stadium would generate A$178,900,000 annually in economic output, support A$87,200,000 in GRP, contribute A$62,800,000 in incomes, and sustain 813 FTE jobs.

According to Stadiums Tasmania CEO James Avery, the stadium could potentially host more than 300 events annually and deliver operating surpluses of up to A$2,000,000 per year.

However, maintenance costs are projected to average approximately A$5,700,000 per year and no government or independent analysis has projected that the stadium would be financially self-sustaining or capable of directly repaying its capital cost.

A cost–benefit analysis (CBA) prepared by KPMG in 2023 estimated the project would result in a negative net economic outcome, returning a benefit–cost ratio (BCR) of 0.69. (Note: CBAs measure direct and indirect effects of a project over its lifetime by comparing total discounted benefits and costs. While KPMG identified qualitative benefits such as civic pride and regional identity, these were not monetised in the final BCR.) An independent planning panel later estimated a lower BCR of 0.53, reflecting a broader set of assumptions relating to infrastructure, site constraints, and planning risks. Economist Nicholas Gruen's review similarly estimated a BCR of 0.513 in its “optimistic case”.

In response, the Tasmanian Government argued that many Australian stadium projects deliver BCRs below 1.0 but are still pursued for strategic or social reasons. Examples cited include the Sydney Football Stadium (2022) (BCR of 0.62) and Queensland Country Bank Stadium in Townsville (BCR of 0.21). As such, the Government did not make the stadium's approval conditional on a positive BCR, stating that its value lies in non-monetised economic, social, and reputational outcomes.

Some assumptions within the KPMG model were later revised or clarified. For example:

- The Northern Access Road, initially attributed to the stadium, had already been proposed under the 2019 Hobart City Deal and is now separately funded.
- Additional bus services are not expected to be required; existing services will operate with event-day surcharges, consistent with practices at other venues such as Western Sydney Stadium.
- The proposed Collins Street footbridge, included in some cost estimates, remains unfunded and is not currently part of the stadium scope.

== Controversies ==
=== Project of State Significance and planning process ===
In October 2023, the Tasmanian Government declared the stadium a Project of State Significance. This designation allowed the state government to override local planning authorities, transferring final approval responsibilities to the Tasmanian Planning Commission. The decision was contentious, with critics arguing that it reduced community input and sidelined local governance. The development application, submitted in September 2024, identified a construction budget of $775 million. In November, the Planning Commission requested substantial additional documentation, which was provided in February 2025 as part of an integrated assessment process.

The decision to construct the Macquarie Point stadium has generated significant debate within the Tasmanian community. Concerns have been raised regarding the selection of the site, the projected costs and potential debt implications for the state, the project's timeline, and the transparency of governmental processes.

=== Political resignations and election fallout ===
On 12 May 2023, Members of Parliament Lara Alexander and John Tucker resigned from the Tasmanian Liberal Party to sit as independents, citing concerns over the proposed stadium project as a contributing factor. Their resignation contributed to the collapse of the government's majority, ultimately triggering the 2024 Tasmanian state election. Opposition Leader Rebecca White and the Tasmanian Labor Party campaigned on a platform to renegotiate the stadium agreement with the AFL; however, the party was defeated for a third consecutive time, and White subsequently stood down as leader. The opposition changed its position on the stadium shortly thereafter.

=== Hobart Cenotaph sightlines and RSL opposition ===
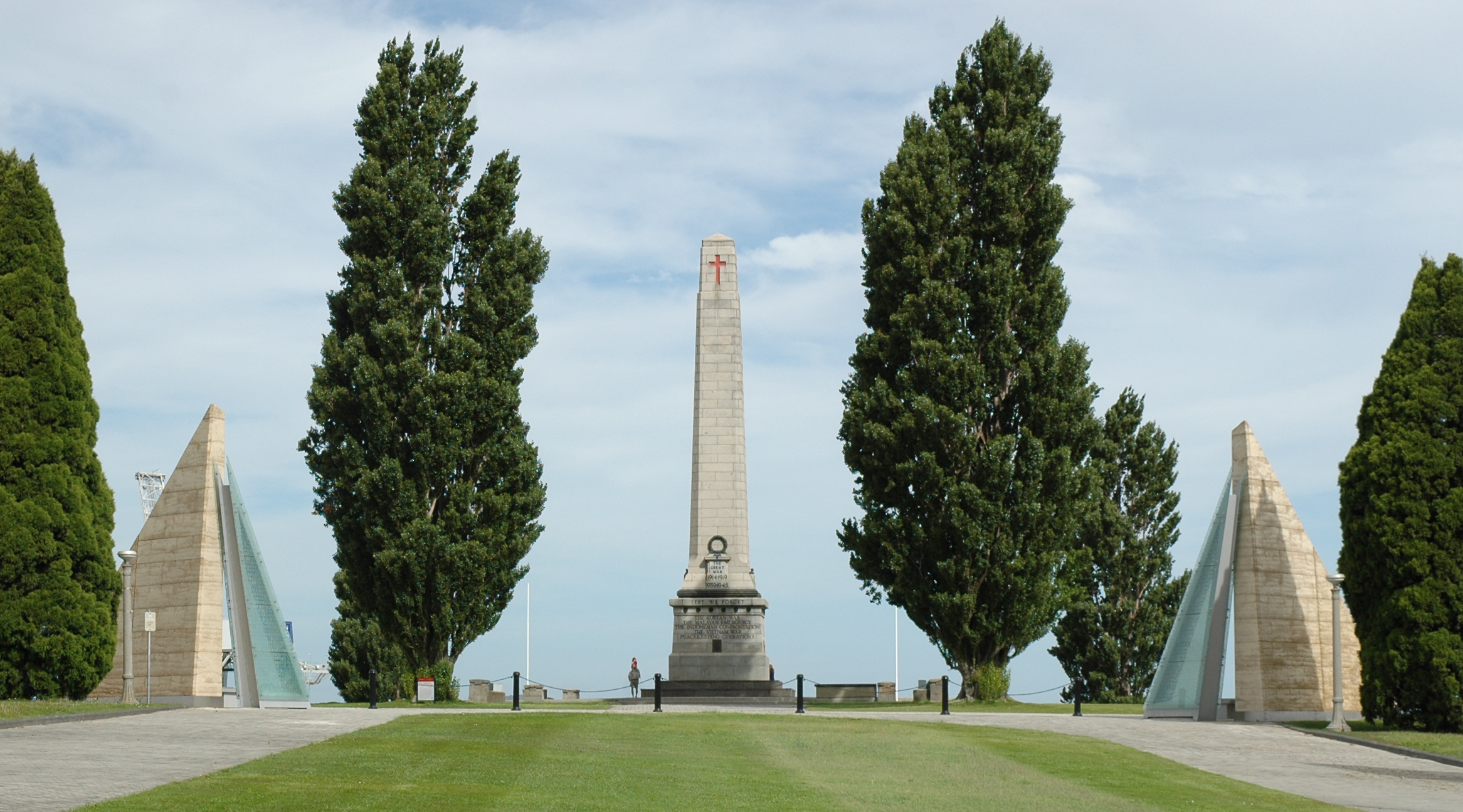
Hobart Cenotaph, c. 2007

The Tasmanian RSL has opposed the Macquarie Point stadium due to concerns it would diminish the prominence of the Hobart Cenotaph, a significant war memorial. The 51 m (167 ft) stadium structure is expected to disrupt key sightlines from the Cenotaph toward Battery Point and the River Derwent.

To mitigate the impact, RSL Tasmania submitted a list of requests to the state government. These included an on-site RSL museum, grandstand naming rights to honour Victoria Cross recipients, allocation of ANZAC Day profits to veteran services, discounted ticketing, and veteran-led business opportunities within the precinct.

On 10 November 2024, over 2,500 people attended a vigil at the Cenotaph, held in partnership with the Tasmanian Symphony Orchestra. Many attendees marched from the Elizabeth Street Mall under the banner of the 'No New Stadium / Our Place' campaign, lowering signs near the memorial in a gesture of respect. While RSL Tasmania described the event as apolitical and focused on remembrance, the Lenah Valley RSL sub-branch criticised it as an inappropriate protest timed to coincide with Remembrance Day commemorations.

In parallel, the Tasmanian Greens released a draft "Hobart Cenotaph Bill", which was developed in consultation with the RSL and aimed at protecting the site from intrusive development. RSL Tasmania continues to support an alternative "Stadium 2.0" proposal at Regatta Point, which includes a museum and avoids impacting Cenotaph sightlines.

=== Concerns from the Tasmanian Symphony Orchestra ===
The Tasmanian Symphony Orchestra (TSO) has raised objections to the stadium's proposed location, approximately 170 m (560 ft) from its home at the Federation Concert Hall. The TSO anticipates that construction and operational noise could disrupt performances and threaten the viability of its activities.

=== Public opinion ===
Public opinion surveys have indicated that support for the stadium is limited, with a majority of respondents to an 'opt in' newspaper based survey expressing opposition to the project. A poll released in February 2025 by EMRS found that 59% of voters were opposed to the stadium, 35% were supportive with 4% unsure.

=== Opposition from Adjacent Businesses and Institutions ===
Prior to the release of the Draft Integrated Assessment Report (DIAR) release by the Tasmanian Planning Commission (TPC) via the Project of State Significance (PoSS) process, the Returned and Services League of Australia (RSL - Tasmania Branch), the Tasmanian Symphony Orchestra (TSO), and Federal Group issued a joint public statement outlining shared concerns about the stadium proposal, citing the absence of resolution of key issues raised to date. The statement noted that the organisations collectively represent the closest physical neighbours to the project and raised concerns relating to planning process, heritage and cultural impacts, access and operational disruption, and the lack of substantive engagement with affected landholders and institutions.

Federal Group in particular participated in public and legislative discussions regarding the proposed Macquarie Point Stadium as a landholder and operator with significant interests in the Sullivans Cove waterfront precinct. The group owns and operates hospitality and tourism properties adjacent to the proposed stadium site, including MACq 01 and Henry Jones Art Hotel, and is also the custodian of several heritage-listed buildings within the precinct.

In its submission to government, Federal Group stated that its interest in the proposal arises from its proximity to the site, its heritage responsibilities, and the operational impacts on adjacent businesses that the Draft Integrated Assessment Report did not consider. The submission raised concerns regarding the planning and consultation process, including the extent to which impacts on access, parking, servicing, pedestrian movement, and heritage values for neighbouring properties had been assessed and mitigated. Federal Group also commented on governance and financial aspects of the proposal, including changes to the project's funding arrangements and the intention to progress the development outside the established Projects of State Significance planning framework. The group stated that its position was not opposition to urban renewal, sporting infrastructure, or a Tasmanian AFL team in principle, but related to the planning process, precinct integration, and long-term functionality of the waterfront heritage area.

As part of their submission, Federal commissioned a statewide poll in April 2025, which found strong public opposition to the project exceeding the A$375 million budget and being removed from the Projects of State Significance process.

=== Legislative attempts to block the project ===
The Tasmanian Greens introduced a bill in the Tasmanian Parliament aiming to halt the stadium project; however, the legislation was unsuccessful.

=== Opposition from independent politicians ===
Several independent Tasmanian politicians, including members of the Jacqui Lambie Network, Kristie Johnston, Craig Garland, Andrew Wilkie, and Meg Webb, have voiced opposition to the stadium. Senator Jacqui Lambie described the agreement with the AFL as a "dud," expressing concerns over financial implications and community division.

In January 2025 during a television appearance on The Project, Lambie proposed that the Tasmanian AFL team instead be based at UTAS Stadium in Launceston, where existing facilities could be upgraded to meet league requirements at a potentially lower cost.

=== Gruen report assessment ===
The economic review of the Macquarie Point Stadium project by economist Dr Nicholas Gruen attracted controversy upon its release, due to its sharply critical findings and parliamentary concerns about the independence of the assessment. Although commissioned as an independent analysis, it was later revealed that Dr Gruen had met with opponents of the stadium prior to his formal appointment. This disclosure, added after the report's publication, prompted concern from the Premier and several Members of Parliament, who argued that the report's impartiality may have been compromised. Dr Gruen described the omission of this detail from the initial publication as an administrative oversight and defended the independence of his findings.

Submitted to the Tasmanian Government on 1 January 2025, the report was highly critical of the project's economic foundations. It concluded that the stadium's proponents had significantly underestimated costs while overstating likely benefits. The report estimated a total project cost of $1.096 billion, including $785 million from the Tasmanian Government, with the remainder expected from the Commonwealth Government, the AFL, and land sales.

Dr Gruen also found that the Tasmanian Government's pledge to cap its investment at $375 million (a figure announced during the 2024 state election) was unlikely to be achievable. Over a projected 30-year period, he estimated the total cost to taxpayers would reach approximately $1.4 billion. The report also questioned the selection of the Macquarie Point site, arguing that alternative locations with lower costs and broader public support had not been sufficiently explored.

=== City of Hobart stance ===
In April 2025, the City of Hobart voted to formally oppose the stadium project to the Tasmanian Planning Commission, despite receiving an independent report that assessed the development as likely to generate $178.9 million in annual economic activity. Council's decision to oppose the development reflected broader concerns about public amenity, city character, and the stadium's overall integration into the urban fabric.

== Counter-proposals for Macquarie Point ==
In response to concerns about the stadium's location and use of public land, a number of unsolicited counter-proposals have been developed for the Macquarie Point site.

=== Our Place proposal ===
The Our Place initiative presented a counterproposal on 20 April 2023, launched by former Governor Kate Warner. The concept envisioned a nationally significant urban renewal precinct focused on housing, open space, culture, and public amenities, with an emphasis on community-led design.

=== Mac Point 2.0 ===
Unveiled on 18 October 2023, "Mac Point 2.0," was proposed by former Tasmanian Premier Paul Lennon and engineer Dean Coleman through the Stadia Precinct Consortium. This plan involved relocating the stadium to Regatta Point, a site originally shortlisted in the government's 2022 stadium feasibility study. The $2.3 billion proposal featured a 23,000-seat stadium with a retractable roof extending 250 metres into the River Derwent on reclaimed land. It also included residential apartments, a hotel, convention centre, private hospital, and retail precinct, to be delivered through a public–private partnership model.

Despite receiving in-principle support from the Hobart City Council, which agreed to consider land transfer if the proposal was accepted, the Tasmanian Government rejected the Mac Point 2.0 concept in January 2025. Ministers cited conflicts with the existing agreement with the AFL and concerns about the feasibility and scale of the development.

== Enabling parliamentary order ==
In October 2025 the state government released the draft order to enable the site to undergo construction for the stadium precinct. The order outlines the conditions the project must adhere to if it is approved by parliament. The order largely follows draft permit conditions submitted by the Macquarie Point Development Corporation to the state Planning Commission in July 2025 and incorporates other matters such as heritage, environmental and council conditions. The order permits an operational management plan to be put in place at least 18 months before the stadium starts operating. Unlike the abandoned enabling legislation which the government had planned to submit to parliament prior to the snap election called mid-year, the relevant minister does not have the power to amend the stadium permit or make changes to the site and instead states that the director of the Environment Protection Authority and Secretary of State Growth can sign off on certain changes.

The order was tabled in the House of Assembly on 4 November 2025. As the stadium had the support of the Liberal minority government and Labor opposition, the order comfortably passed the lower house by 25 votes to 9. The order was debated in the Legislative Council on 3 and 4 December 2025, and was approved by 9 votes to 5.

Details of 2025 parliamentary vote on order approving the stadium

STATE POLICIES AND PROJECTS (MACQUARIE POINT PRECINCT) ORDER 2025 STATUTORY RULES 2025, No. 49 Division on the motion to approve the order in the House of Assembly
Party	Votes for	Votes against	Did not vote
Liberal (14)	13: Eric Abetz; Bridget Archer; Guy Barnett; Felix Ellis; Rob Fairs; Michael Ferguson; Jane Howlett; Roger Jaensch; Madeleine Ogilvie; Gavin Pearce; Jeremy Rockliff; Mark Shelton; Marcus Vermey	–	1: Jacquie Petrusma
Labor (10)	10: Shane Broad; Meg Brown; Jen Butler; Anita Dow; Janie Finlay; Jess Greene; Ella Haddad; Brian Mitchell; Josh Willie; Dean Winter	–	–
Greens (5)	–	5: Tabatha Badger; Vica Bayley; Helen Burnet; Cecily Rosol; Rosalie Woodruff	–
Shooters (1)	1: Carlo Di Falco	–	–
Independent (5)	1: David O'Byrne	4: Craig Garland; Peter George; Kristie Johnston; George Razay	–
Total	25	9	1

STATE POLICIES AND PROJECTS (MACQUARIE POINT PRECINCT) ORDER 2025 STATUTORY RULES 2025, No. 49 Division on the motion to approve the order in the Legislative Council
Party	Votes for	Votes against	Did not vote
Liberal (3)	3: Nick Duigan; Kerry Vincent; Jo Palmer	–	–
Labor (3)	2: Luke Edmunds; Sarah Lovell	–	1: Craig Farrell
Greens (1)	–	1: Cassy O'Connor	–
Independent (8)	4: Dean Harriss; Casey Hiscutt; Tania Rattray; Bec Thomas	4: Rosemary Armitage; Ruth Forrest; Mike Gaffney; Meg Webb	–
Total	9	5	1

== Construction ==
The stadium's final designs were refined following the passage of the statutory order, with a roof test rig established at the site in March 2026. This was intended to test the proposed ETFE roof specifications of the stadium when hosting cricket matches. The first element of construction on the site commenced in July 2026, when Hazell Bros were engaged for the bulk earthworks and overall site preparation, including the excavation of around 100,000 cubic metres of soil. Expressions of interest for the main stadium contractor were subsequently called by the government, with BESIX Watpac and a joint venture consisting of Webuild, China Construction Oceania and McConnell Dowell submitting bids in August. BESIX Watpac were announced as the preferred builder by the government in October 2026, with a fixed-price contract to build the stadium expected be signed by the end of the year.

== Sources ==
=== Hobart City Council ===
- "Sullivans Cove Planning Scheme 1997" (PDF). City of Hobart. 21 December 1998. Archived from the original (PDF) on 25 April 2025.

=== Tasmanian Government ===
- "Club Funding and Development Agreement" (PDF). Department of State Growth. 3 May 2023. Archived from the original (PDF) on 5 May 2025.
- "Tasmanian Government's Proposed Hobart Stadium Feasibility Planning Process" (PDF). Parliament of Tasmania (16 ed.). 2023. Archived from the original (PDF) on 19 April 2025.
- "Macquarie Point Multipurpose Stadium: Landscape & Visual Impact Assessment". Department of State Growth, Tasmania. 25 June 2025. Archived from the original on 27 June 2025.
- "Macquarie Point Multipurpose Stadium: Enabling Legislation Report" (PDF) (Consultation Draft). Department of Premier and Cabinet, Tasmania. May 2025. Archived from the original (PDF) on 8 July 2025.
- "Draft Integrated Assessment Report – Macquarie Point Multipurpose Stadium Project of State Significance" (PDF) (Draft assessment report). Tasmanian Planning Commission. 31 March 2025. Archived from the original (PDF) on 27 May 2025.
- "Cricket-specific design elements and roof design testing" (PDF). Tasmanian Planning Commission. 7 July 2025. Archived from the original (PDF) on 12 July 2025.

=== External reports ===
- "Cost Benefit Analysis: Macquarie Point Multipurpose Stadium" (PDF) (Economic report). KPMG. 5 September 2024. Archived from the original (PDF) on 8 July 2025.
- Gruen, Nicholas (1 January 2025). "Independent Review of the Macquarie Point Stadium". Tasmanian Government. Archived from the original on 21 May 2025.
- "Macquarie Point Stadium Economic Impact Assessment" (PDF). Hobart City Council. AEC Group. 15 April 2025. Archived from the original (PDF) on 16 June 2025.
