= Winter shadow ministry =

Parliament of Tasmania's shadow cabinet

Winter Shadow Ministry
- Cabinet of Tasmania
- Date formed: 16 April 2024
- Date dissolved: 20 August 2025

People and organisations
- Governor: Barbara Baker
- Opposition Leader: Dean Winter
- Deputy Opposition Leader: Anita Dow
- No. of ministers: 13
- Member party: Labor
- Status in legislature: Opposition

History
- Election: 2024 Tasmanian state election
- Predecessor: White Shadow Ministry
- Successor: Willie shadow ministry

The Winter Shadow Ministry is the former shadow cabinet of the Parliament of Tasmania, led by opposition leader, Dean Winter. The ministry was composed entirely of members of Tasmanian Labor. It was succeeded on 20 August 2025 by the Willie shadow ministry as Winter was defeated by Willie as the party's leader.

Party	Minister	Portfolio
Labor	Dean Winter	Leader of the Opposition; Jobs, Workplace Relations and Safety; Trade and Major Investment; Tourism and Hospitality
Labor	Anita Dow	Deputy Leader of the Opposition; Infrastructure; TAFE, Skills and Training; Industry and Regional Development; Local Government; Small Business
Labor	Shane Broad	Leader of Opposition Business; Housing; Planning; Building and Construction; Consumer Affairs; Resources
Labor	Meg Brown	Opposition Whip; Transport; Prevention of Family and Sexual Violence; Heritage and Arts
Labor	Jen Butler	Police, Fire and Emergency Management; Corrections and Rehabilitation; Veterans' Affairs; Women
Labor	Luke Edmunds	Finance; Sport and Events; Racing
Labor	Janie Finlay	Energy and Renewables; Parks, Environment and Climate Change; Primary Industries and Water; Science and Technology
Labor	Ella Haddad	Health; Mental Health and Wellbeing; Community Services; Multicultural Affairs; Disability; Equality
Labor	Sarah Lovell	Leader of Opposition Business in the Legislative Council; Education and Early Years; Children and Youth
Labor	Rebecca White	Shadow Attorney General; Justice; Integrity
Labor	Josh Willie	Shadow Treasurer; Cost of Living; Aboriginal Affairs
