= Opposition (Tasmania) =

The Opposition in the Australian state of Tasmania comprises the largest party not in Government. The Opposition's purpose is to hold the Government to account and constitute a "Government-in-waiting" should the existing Government fall. To that end, a Leader of the Opposition and Shadow Ministers for the various government departments question the Premier and Ministers on Government policy and administration, and formulate the policy the Opposition would pursue in Government. It is sometimes styled "His Majesty's Loyal Opposition" to demonstrate that although it opposes the Government, it remains loyal to the King.

The current Leader of the Opposition is Labor Leader Josh Willie and Janie Finlay is the Deputy Leader.

== Current shadow ministry ==
Portrait	Party	Name	Portfolio	Electorate	Faction
	Labor	The Hon. Josh Willie MP	Leader of the Opposition · Economic Development · Education & Early Years	Clark	Left
	Labor	Janie Finlay MP	Deputy Leader of the Opposition · Energy & Renewables · Parks, Environment and Climate Change · Primary Industries & Aquaculture · Innovation and Artificial Intelligence and the digital economy	Bass	Right
	Labor	Ella Haddad MP	Leader of Opposition Business in the House · Attorney General · Justice and Integrity · Workplace Relations · Equality	Clark	Left
	Labor	Dean Winter MP	Treasurer · Planning · Racing	Franklin	Right
	Labor	The Hon. Sarah Lovell MLC	Leader of Opposition Business in the Legislative Council · Health and Mental Health Wellbeing and Aging· Disability · Women	Rumney	Unknown
	Labor	Meg Brown MP	Opposition Whip · Prevention of Family and Sexual Violence · Heritage and Arts · Housing	Franklin	Left
	Labor	Shane Broad MP	Building and Construction · Consumer Affairs · Resources	Braddon	Right
	Labor	Jen Butler MP	Police, Fire and Emergency Services · Corrections and Rehabilitation · Veterans Affairs · Transport	Lyons	Unknown
	Labor	Anita Dow MP	Infrastructure · Tourism and Events · Local Government · Aboriginal affairs	Braddon	Left
	Labor	The Hon. Luke Edmunds MLC	Finance · Stadiums and Sport · Hospitality	Pembroke	Unknown
	Labor	Brian Mitchell	TAFE, Skills & Training · Small Business	Lyons	Left
	Labor	Jess Greene	Children and Young People · Community Services · Multicultural Affairs	Bass	Left

== See also ==
- Government of Tasmania
- Opposition (Australia)
