= Willie shadow ministry =

Opposition shadow cabinet of Tasmania (2025-)

Willie Shadow Ministry

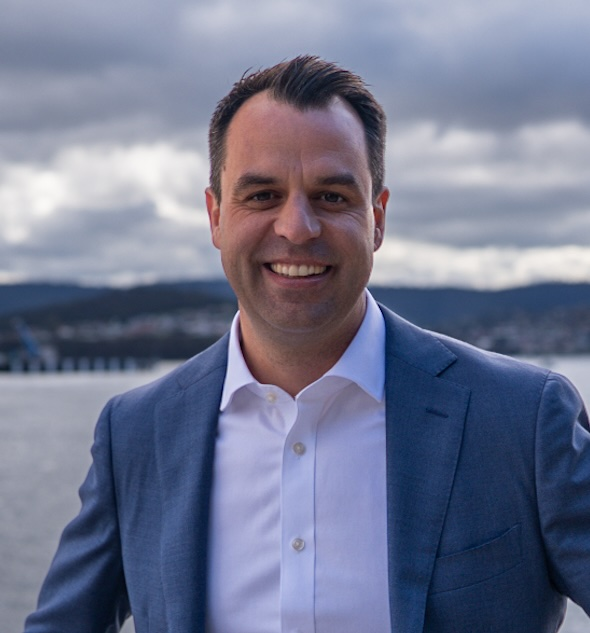
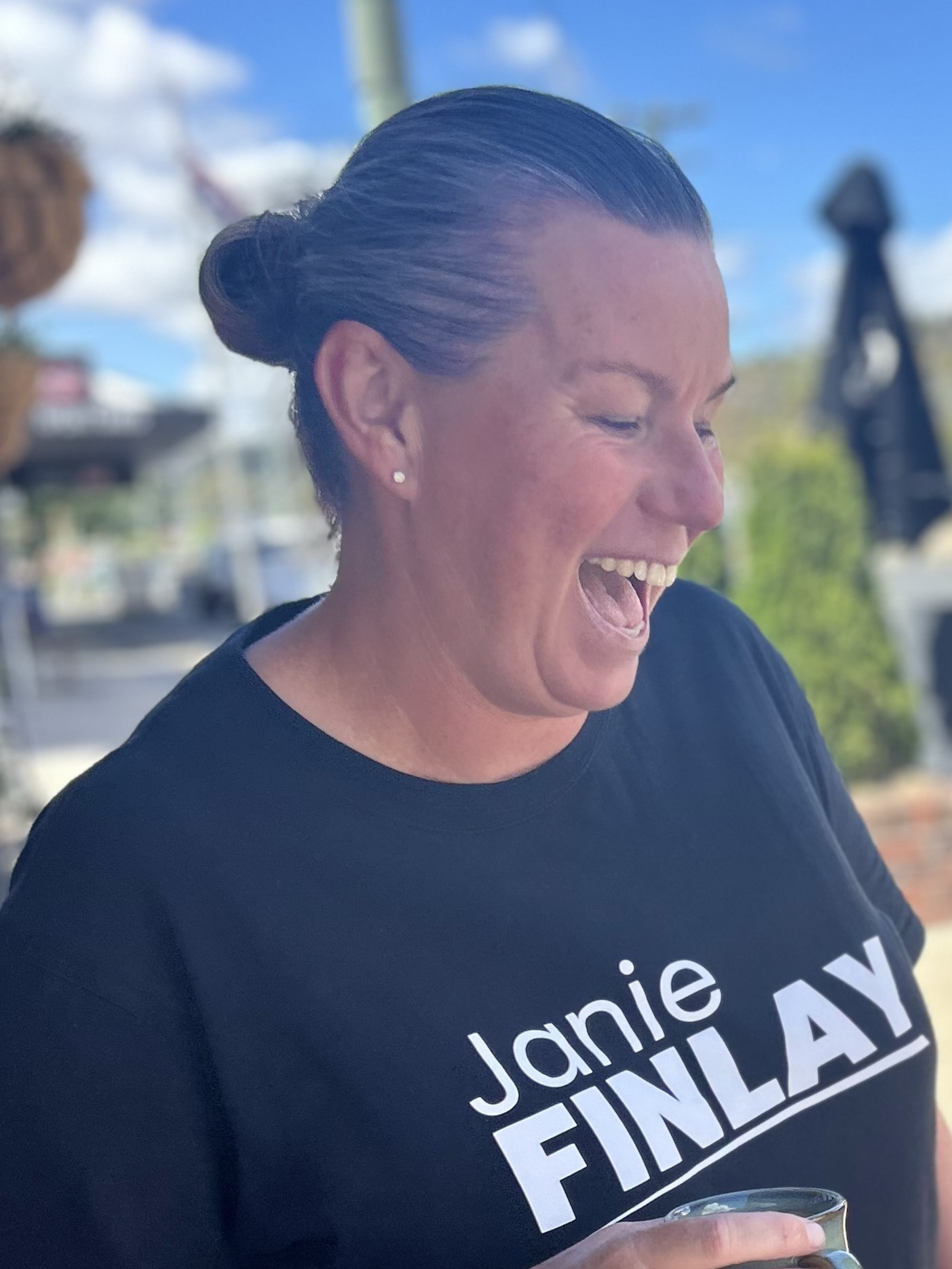
- Josh Willie (Leader) Janie Finlay (Deputy Leader) Shadow cabinet of Tasmania
- Date formed: August 27, 2025

People and organisations
- Monarch: Charles III
- Governor: Barbara Baker
- Opposition Leader: Josh Willie
- Deputy Leader: Janie Finlay
- Member party: Labor
- Status in legislature: Opposition 10 / 35

History
- Election: 2025
- Predecessor: Winter shadow ministry

The Willie Shadow Ministry is the current opposition cabinet of Tasmania, led by Josh Willie and his deputy Janie Finlay. It was formed following the Labor defeat at the 2025 state election and subsequent 2025 Tasmanian Labor Party leadership election.

== Current composition ==
Portrait	Party	Name	Portfolio	Electorate	Faction
	Labor	The Hon. Josh Willie MP	Leader of the Opposition · Economic Development · Education & Early Years	Clark	Left
	Labor	Janie Finlay MP	Deputy Leader of the Opposition · Energy & Renewables · Parks, Environment and Climate Change · Primary Industries & Aquaculture · Innovation and Artificial Intelligence and the digital economy	Bass	Right
	Labor	Ella Haddad MP	Leader of Opposition Business in the House · Attorney General · Justice and Integrity · Workplace Relations · Equality	Clark	Left
	Labor	Dean Winter MP	Treasurer · Planning · Racing	Franklin	Right
	Labor	The Hon. Sarah Lovell MLC	Leader of Opposition Business in the Legislative Council · Health and Mental Health Wellbeing and Aging· Disability · Women	Rumney	Unknown
	Labor	Meg Brown MP	Opposition Whip · Prevention of Family and Sexual Violence · Heritage and Arts · Housing	Franklin	Left
	Labor	Shane Broad MP	Building and Construction · Consumer Affairs · Resources	Braddon	Right
	Labor	Jen Butler MP	Police, Fire and Emergency Services · Corrections and Rehabilitation · Veterans Affairs · Transport	Lyons	Right
	Labor	Anita Dow MP	Infrastructure · Tourism and Events · Local Government · Aboriginal affairs	Braddon	Left
	Labor	The Hon. Luke Edmunds MLC	Finance · Stadiums and Sport · Hospitality	Pembroke	Unknown
	Labor	Brian Mitchell	TAFE, Skills & Training · Small Business	Lyons	Left
	Labor	Jess Greene	Children and Young People · Community Services · Multicultural Affairs	Bass	Left
