= List of Tasmanian House of Assembly countbacks =

This is a list of casual vacancies in the Tasmanian House of Assembly since 1965. Casual vacancies in the House of Assembly are filled by a countback of the votes of the departing member.

Date	Electorate	Outgoing member	Party	Reason for vacancy	Incoming member	Party
12 February 2025	Lyons	Rebecca White	Labor	Resigned to contest the 2025 Australian federal election in the federal seat of Lyons	Casey Farrell	Labor
4 October 2023	Franklin	Elise Archer	Independent	Resigned as an independent after quitting the Liberal Party a week earlier after being forced to resign as Minister	Simon Behrakis	Liberal
13 July 2023	Franklin	Cassy O'Connor	Greens	Resigned as Greens leader and in a successful bid for Legislative Council seat of Hobart at the 2024 periodic elections	Vica Bayley	Greens
25 July 2022	Franklin	Jacquie Petrusma	Liberal	Resigned	Dean Young	Liberal
8 April 2022	Bass	Peter Gutwein	Liberal	Resigned as Premier	Simon Wood	Liberal
10 February 2022	Bass	Sarah Courtney	Liberal	Resigned	Lara Alexander	Liberal
14 March 2021	Braddon	Adam Brooks	Liberal	Resigned	Felix Ellis	Liberal
27 July 2020	Braddon	Joan Rylah	Liberal	Resigned	Felix Ellis	Liberal
20 January 2020	Franklin	Will Hodgman	Liberal	Resigned as Premier	Nic Street	Liberal
25 August 2019	Clark	Scott Bacon	Labor	Resigned with his replacement quitting the Labor Party and entering Parliament as an independent	Madeleine Ogilvie	Independent
25 February 2019	Lyons	Rene Hidding	Liberal	Resigned	John Tucker	Liberal
12 February 2019	Braddon	Adam Brooks	Liberal	Resigned	Joan Rylah	Liberal
17 March 2017	Braddon	Bryan Green	Labor	Resigned as opposition leader	Shane Broad	Labor
3 March 2016	Franklin	Paul Harriss	Liberal	Resigned	Nic Street	Liberal
17 August 2015	Franklin	Nick McKim	Greens	Resigned to accept Senate appointment	Rosalie Woodruff	Greens
9 June 2015	Bass	Kim Booth	Greens	Resigned as Greens leader	Andrea Dawkins	Greens
26 May 2011	Denison	David Bartlett	Labor	Resigned as Premier	Graeme Sturges	Labor
9 February 2009	Franklin	Paula Wriedt	Labor	Resigned after being dropped as Minister	Daniel Hulme	Labor
28 July 2008	Denison	Peg Putt	Greens	Resigned as Greens leader	Cassy O'Connor	Greens
27 May 2008	Franklin	Paul Lennon	Labor	Resigned as Premier	Ross Butler	Labor
10 May 2005	Lyons	Ken Bacon	Labor	Resigned as Minister	Heather Butler	Labor
1 April 2004	Denison	Jim Bacon	Labor	Resigned as Premier due to ill health	David Bartlett	Labor
22 April 2002	Franklin	Fran Bladel	Labor	Resigned in unsuccessful bid for Legislative Council seat of Huon at 2002 periodic elections	Neville Oliver	Labor
19 October 2001	Franklin	Peter Hodgman	Liberal	Resigned in unsuccessful bid for Franklin at the 2001 federal election	Martin McManus	Liberal
21 August 2001	Denison	Ray Groom	Liberal	Resigned	Michael Hodgman	Liberal
14 March 2000	Bass	Frank Madill	Liberal	Resigned due to ill health	David Fry	Liberal
15 July 1997	Braddon	Michael Field	Labor	Resigned	Mike Gard	Labor
15 July 1997	Braddon	Roger Groom	Liberal	Resigned	Carole Cains	Liberal
15 December 1995	Lyons	Robin Gray	Liberal	Resigned	Denise Swan	Liberal
15 May 1995	Franklin	Gerry Bates	Greens	Resigned in unsuccessful bid for Legislative Council seat of Queenborough at the 1995 periodic elections	Mike Foley	Greens
10 April 1995	Franklin	Michael Aird	Labor	Resigned in successful bid for Legislative Council seat of Derwent at the 1995 periodic elections	John Sheppard	Labor
26 February 1993	Denison	Bob Brown	Greens	Resigned	Peg Putt	Greens
15 October 1990	Franklin	Ken Wriedt	Labor	Resigned	Paul Lennon	Labor
6 August 1990	Franklin	Nick Evers	Liberal	Resigned	Brian Davison	Liberal
15 February 1990	Denison	John Bennett	Liberal	Resigned	Chris Gibson	Liberal
14 November 1988	Franklin	Geoff Pearsall	Liberal	Resigned	John Cleary	Liberal
29 September 1987	Denison	Geoff Davis	Liberal	Resigned	John Barker	Liberal
14 July 1987	Lyons	Darrel Baldock	Labor	Resigned to return to football coaching	Chris Batt	Labor
10 August 1984	Bass	Michael Barnard	Labor	Resigned	Peter Patmore	Labor
25 June 1984	Denison	John Devine	Labor	Resigned	Bob Graham	Labor
25 June 1984	Denison	Max Bingham	Liberal	Resigned	Carmel Holmes	Liberal
4 January 1983	Denison	Norm Sanders	Democrat	Resigned	Bob Brown	Green Independents
8 September 1980	Denison	Neil Batt	Labor	Resigned	Bob Graham	Labor
28 September 1979	Franklin	Eric Barnard	Labor	Resigned	Bill McKinnon	Labor
12 December 1977	Franklin	Bill Neilson	Labor	Resigned	Bill McKinnon	Labor
10 July 1975	Wilmot	Angus Bethune	Liberal	Resigned	Ian Braid	Liberal
16 May 1975	Braddon	Lloyd Costello	Labor	Resigned	John Coughlan	Labor
12 April 1975	Braddon	Eric Reece	Labor	Resigned	Joseph Britton	Labor
17 August 1974	Denison	Kevin Corby	Labor	Resigned	John Green	Labor
26 July 1974	Wilmot	Roy Fagan	Labor	Resigned	Charles Batt	Labor
26 July 1974	Bass	Allan Foster	Labor	Resigned	Harry Holgate	Labor
27 April 1974	Denison	Merv Everett	Labor	Resigned in successful bid for the Australian Senate at the 1974 federal election	Ian Cole	Labor
25 October 1968	Bass	John Steer	Liberal	Died in office	James Henty	Liberal
27 October 1966	Franklin	Thomas Pearsall	Liberal	Resigned in successful bid for seat of Franklin at the 1966 federal election	Eric Iles	Liberal
10 July 1965	Denison	Rex Townley	Liberal	Resigned	George Deas Brown	Liberal

== See also ==
- Members of the Tasmanian House of Assembly
