= Members of the Tasmanian House of Assembly, 2025–2029 =

Tasmanian politicians elected in 2025

This is a list of members of the Tasmanian House of Assembly, elected at the 2025 state election.

Name	Party	Electorate	Years in office
Hon Eric Abetz	Liberal	Franklin	2024–present
Bridget Archer	Liberal	Bass	2025–present
Tabatha Badger	Greens	Lyons	2024–present
Hon Guy Barnett	Liberal	Lyons	2014–present
Vica Bayley	Greens	Clark	2023–present
Dr Shane Broad	Labor	Braddon	2017–present
Meg Brown	Labor	Franklin	2024–present
Helen Burnet^{1}	Greens/Independent	Clark	2024–present
Jen Butler	Labor	Lyons	2018–present
Carlo Di Falco	SFF	Lyons	2025–present
Anita Dow	Labor	Braddon	2018–present
Hon Felix Ellis	Liberal	Braddon	2020–2021, 2021–present
Rob Fairs	Liberal	Bass	2024–present
Hon Michael Ferguson	Liberal	Bass	2010–present
Janie Finlay	Labor	Bass	2021–present
Craig Garland	Independent	Braddon	2024–present
Peter George	Independent	Franklin	2025–present
Jess Greene	Labor	Bass	2025–present
Ella Haddad	Labor	Clark	2018–present
Hon Jane Howlett	Liberal	Lyons	2024–present
Hon Roger Jaensch	Liberal	Braddon	2014–present
Kristie Johnston	Independent	Clark	2021–present
Brian Mitchell	Labor	Lyons	2025–present
David O'Byrne	Independent	Franklin	2010–2014, 2018–present
Hon Madeleine Ogilvie	Liberal	Clark	2014–2018, 2019–present
Gavin Pearce	Liberal	Braddon	2025–present
Hon Jacquie Petrusma	Liberal	Franklin	2010–2022, 2024–present
George Razay	Independent	Bass	2025–present
Hon Jeremy Rockliff	Liberal	Braddon	2002–present
Cecily Rosol	Greens	Bass	2024–present
Mark Shelton	Liberal	Lyons	2010–present
Marcus Vermey	Liberal	Clark	2025–present
Josh Willie	Labor	Clark	2024–present
Hon Dean Winter	Labor	Franklin	2021–present
Dr Rosalie Woodruff	Greens	Franklin	2015–present

^{1} Clark MHA Helen Burnet resigned from the Greens on 2 August 2026 to sit as an independent.

== See also ==
- List of past members of the Tasmanian House of Assembly
