= Ella Haddad =

Australian politician (born 1978)

Ella Haddad MP

Vice President of Tasmanian Labor
- Incumbent
- Assumed office 29 April 2026 Serving with Anne Urquhart
- President: Nick Sherry

Member of the Tasmanian Parliament for Clark
- Incumbent
- Assumed office 28 September 2018 Serving with 6 others

Member of the Tasmanian Parliament for Denison
- In office 3 March 2018 – 28 September 2018
Shadow portfolios Since 2025
Willie Shadow Ministry
2025–	Leader of Opposition Business
2025–	Shadow Attorney-General
2025–	Shadow Minister for Justice and Integrity
2025–	Shadow Minister for Workplace Relations
2025–	Shadow Minister for Equality

Personal details
- Party: Labor
- Other political affiliations: Labor Left
- Education: University of Tasmania
- Occupation: politician
- Website: www.ellahaddad.com

Eloise Rafia "Ella" Haddad is an Australian politician. She was first elected to the Tasmanian House of Assembly for the Labor Party in the Division of Denison at the 2018 state election.

Haddad unsuccessfully contested the Labor Left ballot for the 2025 Tasmanian Labor Party leadership election, with Left's nomination instead going to Josh Willie.

Haddad also serves as co-vice president of the Tasmanian Labor Party.

== Early life and education ==
Haddad graduated with degrees in arts and law from the University of Tasmania before working in the electorate office of the former federal member for Denison, Duncan Kerr. Haddad also worked for several Labor members of the Tasmanian parliament as a legal and policy adviser. These included roles in the offices of former Attorneys-General of Tasmania, Judy Jackson and her successor, Steve Kons, Lisa Singh when she was a member of the Tasmanian parliament, and Rebecca White MP. She has served as Secretary of the Tasmanian branch of the International Commission of Jurists, including participating in international conferences. Haddad has also served as president of the Tasmanian branch of the Fabian Society, a think tank researching progressive political ideas and public policy reform. Haddad commenced further study as a postgraduate student at the University of Tasmania.

Haddad served on the boards of several Tasmanian community organisations over many years including the Tasmanian Council of Social Services (TasCOSS), Women's Health Tasmania (then Hobart Women's Health Centre), TasCAHRD, TasDeaf and Ten Lives Cat Centre (then the Hobart Cat Centre).

== Political career (2018–present) ==
At the 2018 Tasmanian state election, Haddad was elected to the seat of Denison, alongside Scott Bacon with a swing to the Tasmanian Labor Party in the seat of 8.1%. Following the renaming of the seat to Clark, Haddad re-contested the 2021 Tasmanian state election and held her seat with a 4.4% swing. In the subsequent opposition ministry reshuffle, Haddad was chosen as Shadow Attorney-General and Minister for Justice, Shadow Minister for Corrections, Shadow Minister for Housing, Shadow Minister for Multicultural Affairs and Shadow Minister for Equality.

Since Haddad's election to parliament, she has focused on taking a progressive stance on policy positions such as law reform, housing and transgender rights.

As the Labor Party's shadow attorney-general, Haddad has drafted legislation to progressively change transgender rights in Tasmania. This has included drafting an act of parliament that has allowed Tasmanians to choose whether they would like their gender on their birth certificate.

In February 2024, Haddad was shortlisted for the 2023 McKinnon Prize in the category of State and Territory Political Leader of the Year.

Haddad was reelected in the 2024 Tasmanian election as the first candidate to reach the quota in Clark, and subsequently received the health portfolio in Labor leader Dean Winter's shadow ministry.

Haddad was re-elected at the 2025 Tasmanian state election.

In January 2026, Haddad was one of three Labor MPs who apologised after being overheard playing a game of "shoot, shag or marry" while at Hobart's Taste of Summer festival.
