= Meg Brown =

Australian politician

Meg Brown MP
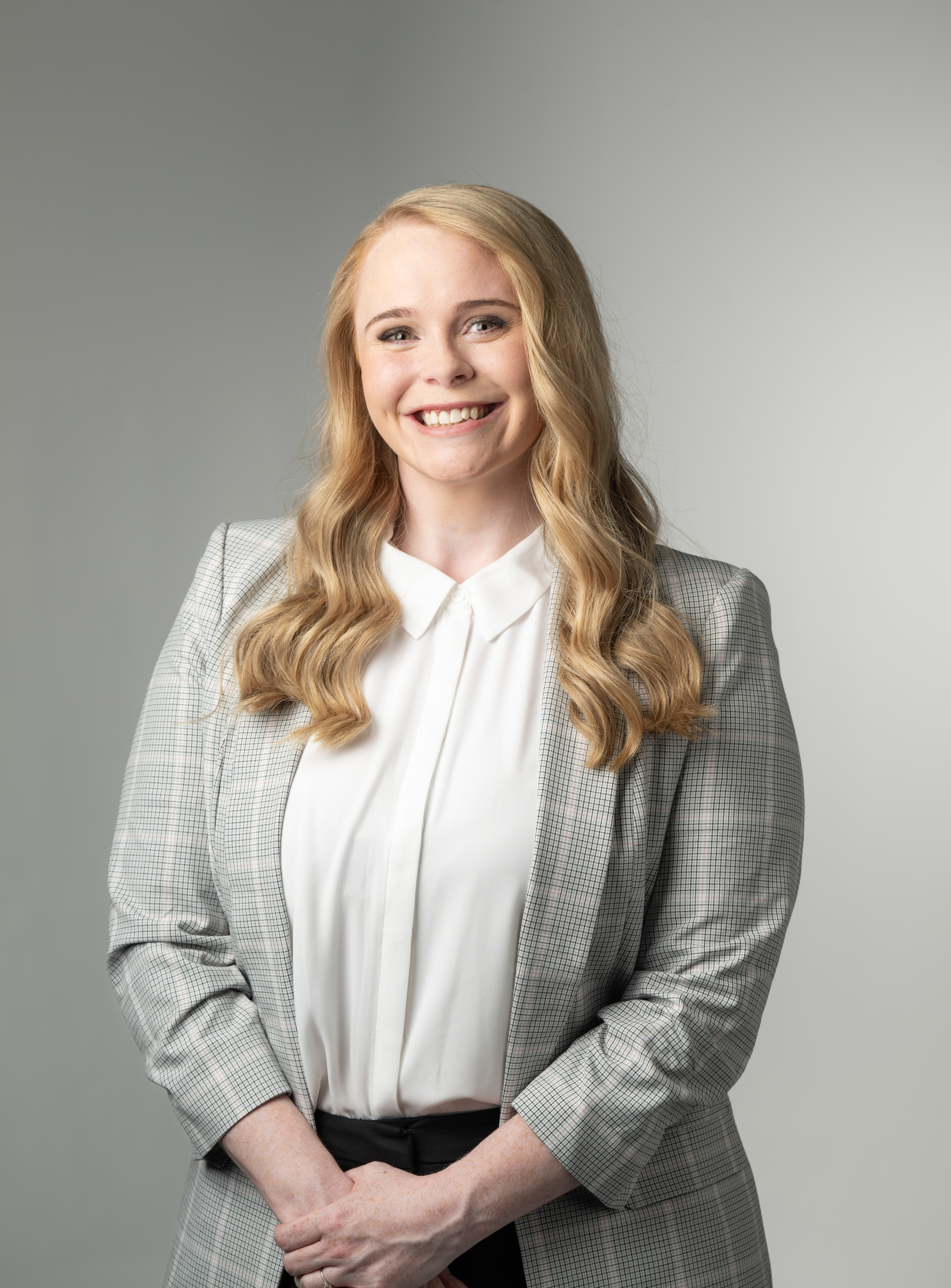

Member of the Tasmanian Parliament for Franklin
- Incumbent
- Assumed office 23 March 2024 Serving with 6 others

Personal details
- Born: 18 June 1992 (age 34) Hobart
- Party: Labor Party
- Children: 2
- Relatives: Carol Brown (aunt)
- Occupation: Hairdresser, electorate officer
- Website: https://taslabor.org.au/people/meg-brown/

Shadow portfolios Since 2025

Willie Shadow Ministry
- 2025–: Opposition Whip
- 2025–: Shadow Minister for Prevention of Family and Sexual Violence
- 2025–: Shadow Minister for Heritage and Arts
- 2025–: Shadow Minister for Housing

Meg Brown is an Australian politician. She was elected to the Tasmanian House of Assembly for the Labor Party in the Division of Franklin at the 2024 state election. Brown is the niece of Tasmanian Senator Carol Brown. Prior to her election to parliament, Brown was a hairdresser and electorate officer for Labor-turned-independent MP, David O'Byrne.

Brown was a councilor for Sorell Council first elected in 2022 before resigning in 2023 after relocating away from the municipality and becoming ineligible to serve.

== State Parliamentary Career ==
Brown was first elected at the 2024 State Election, representing the division of Franklin. Brown was appointed Party Whip and Shadow Minister for Transport, Prevention of family and sexual violence, and heritage and the arts in the Winter Shadow Ministry.

At the snap 2025 Tasmanian state election, Brown was reelected. Following the election, it is reported that Brown was only one of four MPs to vote for Josh Willie to replace Dean Winter as Labor Leader in the resulting leadership election. Winter did eventually withdraw his candidacy for the leadership.

In the Willie Shadow Ministry, Brown retained her portfolios, however swapped transport for housing.
