= Jess Greene =

Australian politician

Jess Greene MP

Member of the Tasmanian House of Assembly for Bass
- Incumbent
- Assumed office 19 July 2025 Serving with 6 others
- Preceded by: Michelle O'Byrne
Shadow portfolios Since 2025
Willie Shadow Ministry
2025–	Shadow Minister for Children and Young People
2025–	Shadow Minister for Community Services
2025–	Shadow Minister for Multicultural Affairs

Personal details
- Party: Labor Party

Jessica Alysse Greene is an Australian politician. She was elected as a member for the Labor Party in the Division of Bass in the Tasmanian House of Assembly at the 2025 state election. Prior to this she was a deputy mayor of West Tamar Council elected in 2022 after first becoming a councillor in 2020 in a recount following another councillors resignation.
