= Jen Butler =

Australian politician

Jen Butler MP

Member of the Tasmanian Parliament for Lyons
- Incumbent
- Assumed office 3 March 2018 Serving with 6 others

Personal details
- Born: 1972 or 1973 (age 53–54)
- Party: Labor Party
- Parent: Heather Butler (mother)
- Website: www.jenbutlermp.com.au

Shadow portfolios Since 2025

Willie Shadow Ministry
- 2025–: Shadow Minister for Police, Fire and Emergency Services
- 2025–: Shadow Minister for Corrections and Rehabilitation
- 2025–: Shadow Minister for Veterans Affairs
- 2025–: Shadow Minister for Transport

Jenna Anna Butler is an Australian politician. She was first elected to the Tasmanian House of Assembly for the Labor Party in the Division of Lyons at the 2018 state election.

== Political career ==
Butler was re-elected at the 2025 Tasmanian state election.

On 19 August 2025, following the 2025 state election, Butler was nominated as the Labor candidate for speaker of the House of Assembly, contesting the election against Liberal candidate Jacquie Petrusma. She lost this election, with Petrusma winning in a landside of 25 to 10 votes. Later that same day after failing to secure the speakership, Labor nominated her for the position of Chair of Committees, in an elected against Greens candidate Helen Burnet. She too lost this vote in a landslide, with Burnet being elected with a vote of 21 to Butler's 12.

In the 2025 Tasmanian Labor Party leadership election, Butler was one of nine Labor members who unsuccessfully voted to retain Dean Winter as Labor leader.

== Early life ==
Prior to her election, she worked for Lyons MPs Michael Polley and David Llewellyn.

She is the daughter of former Tasmanian MP Heather Butler.

She is married to her husband David and has three children.
