= Brian Mitchell (politician) =

Australian politician (born 1967)

Brian Mitchell MP

Member of the Tasmanian House of Assembly for Lyons
- Incumbent
- Assumed office 19 July 2025 Serving with 6 others
- Preceded by: Casey Farrell
Shadow portfolios Since 2025
Willie Shadow Ministry
| 2025– | Shadow Minister for TAFE, Skills and Training |
| 2025– | Shadow Minister for Small Business |

Member of the Australian Parliament for Lyons
- In office 2 July 2016 – 28 March 2025
- Preceded by: Eric Hutchinson
- Succeeded by: Rebecca White

Personal details
- Born: 16 July 1967 (age 59) Coventry, England
- Citizenship: Australian; British (1967–2012)
- Party: Australian Labor Party
- Children: two daughters
- Education: Curtin University of Technology
- Website: www.brianmitchell.com.au

Brian Keith Mitchell (born 16 July 1967) is an Australian politician and is currently a member of the Tasmanian House of Assembly for the electorate of Lyons. Mitchell was previously the member for the federal seat of Lyons in the Australian House of Representatives after winning the seat at the 2016 federal election, until he stood down prior to the 2025 federal election.

== Early life and education ==
Mitchell was born in Coventry in the United Kingdom, emigrated to Australia with parent in 1975 and raised in Perth, Western Australia. He attended Maddington Senior High School and Curtin University, where he obtained a Bachelor of Arts in English, Journalism and Politics in 1989. At university, he worked in various jobs as a kitchenhand, shelf stacker, bartender and fast food manager, was a member of the University Labor Society, and a councillor of the Curtin Student Guild.

== Career ==
Mitchell started his career in print journalism for the Fremantle Herald, where he worked as a journalist from 1989 to 1991, and then as editor from 1994 to 2007. From 1991 to 1992, he worked as publications officer for the ACT Council of Social Service, and then from 1992 to 1994 as adviser to the Federal Labor member for Chifley, Roger Price. After leaving the Fremantle Herald in 2007, he moved to Tasmania and worked as chief of staff for Tasmanian Labor member for Denison Duncan Kerr. He then ran his own public relations and media consultancy firm from 2008 to 2016.

== Political career ==
Mitchell has been a member of the Australian Labor Party since 1988. Before election to parliament, he served as a member of Tasmanian Labor's Administrative Committee and secretary of the Southern Central Policy Branch. He was also secretary of the Lenah Valley Branch from 2009 to 2011, the Richmond Branch from 2011 to 2012, and the Sorell-Tasman Branch from 2012 to 2016.

=== Federal politics ===
Mitchell was elected to the House of Representatives at the 2016 federal election, defeating incumbent Liberal MP Eric Hutchinson in the Division of Lyons.

In December 2017, during the parliamentary eligibility crisis, Mitchell "tried to physically block an ABC cameraman" and reportedly then told reporter Matt Wordsworth to "go and do your research, maggot!". Mitchell says what he said was "go and do your research, Matt" but concedes the audio is indistinct and that Wordsworth genuinely thought he had said the former. Mitchell apologised personally and in the parliament to Wordsworth for what he has described as his "boofheaded intervention". Wordsworth had been attempting to question Justine Keay about her citizenship status.

In November 2024, prime minister Anthony Albanese announced that former Tasmanian Labor Leader Rebecca White would be contesting the seat of Lyons at the upcoming federal election, with Mitchell standing aside. Mitchell delivered his valedictory speech to federal parliament on 26 November 2024. Despite voluntarily stepping aside and endorsing White, Mitchell still ran for preselection, thus making him eligible for a $115k payout for MPs who "sought and failed" the endorsement of their party.

=== State politics ===
Mitchell was elected to the state seat of Lyons at the 2025 Tasmanian State Election. Mitchell defeated incumbent member Casey Farrell for the second Labor seat.

Following the election, it is reported that Mitchell was only one of four MPs to vote for Josh Willie to replace Dean Winter as Labor Leader in the resulting leadership election. Winter did eventually withdraw his candidacy for the leadership.

Mitchell was appointed as Shadow Minister for TAFE, Skills and training, and small business in the Willie Shadow Ministry.

Australian House of Representatives
| Preceded by Eric Hutchinson | Member for Lyons; 2016–2025 | Succeeded by Rebecca White |
