= Anita Dow =

Australian politician

Anita Dow MP
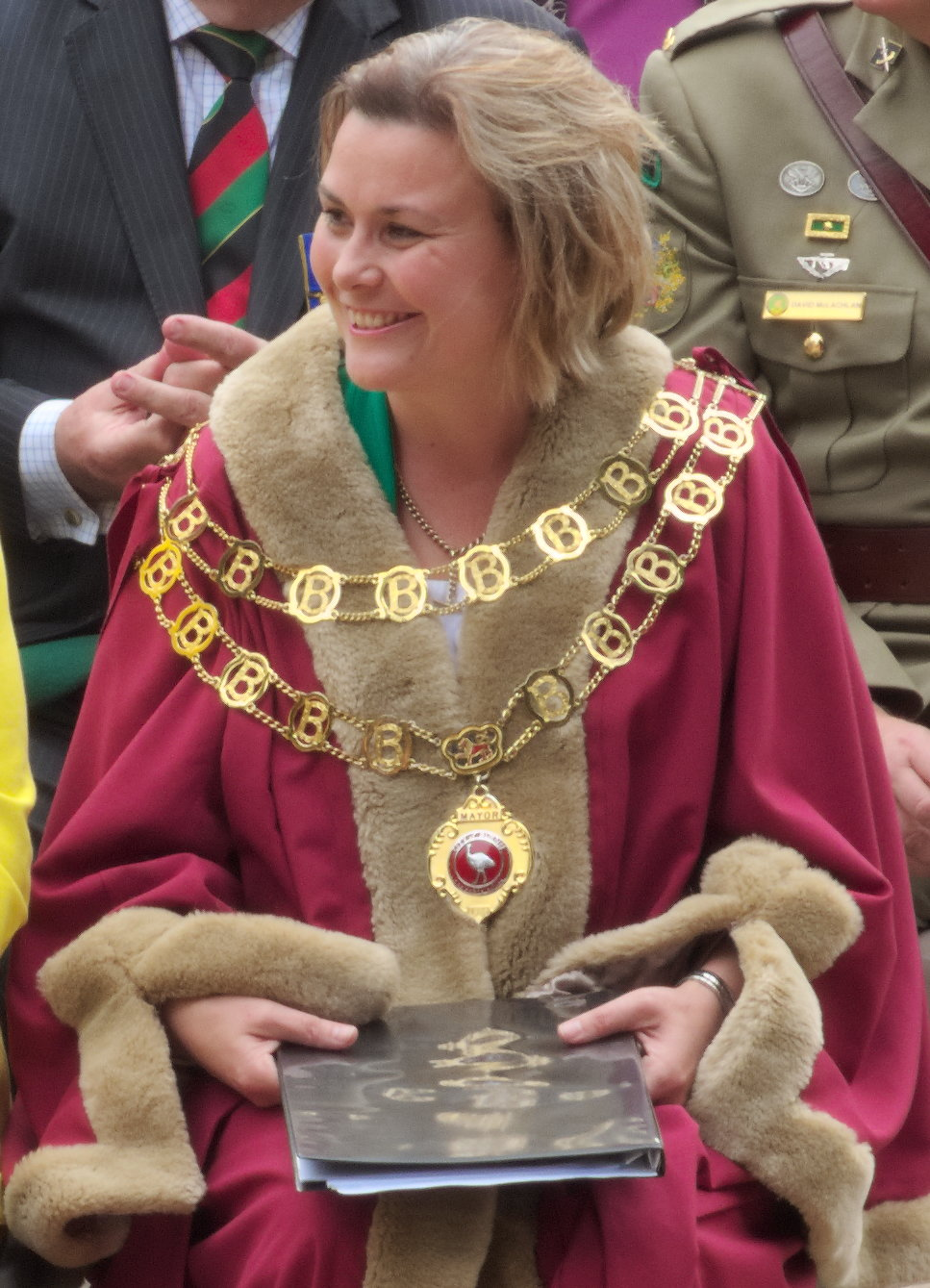
- Dow in 2015

Deputy Leader of the Opposition of Tasmania
- In office 17 May 2021 – 20 August 2025
- Premier: Peter Gutwein; Jeremy Rockliff
- Leader: David O’Byrne; Rebecca White; Dean Winter
- Preceded by: Michelle O’Byrne
- Succeeded by: Janie Finlay
Shadow portfolios Since 2025
Willie Shadow Ministry
2025–	Shadow Minister for Infrastructure
2025–	Shadow Minister for Tourism and Events
2025–	Shadow Minister for Local Government
2025–	Shadow Minister for Aboriginal Affairs

Deputy Leader of the Tasmanian Labor Party
- In office 17 May 2021 – 20 August 2025
- Leader: David O’Byrne; Rebecca White; Dean Winter
- Preceded by: Michelle O’Byrne
- Succeeded by: Janie Finlay

Member of the Tasmanian House of Assembly for Braddon
- Incumbent
- Assumed office 3 March 2018 Serving with 6 others

Mayor of Burnie
- In office 28 October 2014 – 23 October 2017
- Preceded by: Steve Kons
- Succeeded by: Alvwyn Boyd

Personal details
- Born: 1977 or 1978 (age 47–48) Burnie, Tasmania
- Party: Labor Party

Anita Joy Dow is an Australian politician and a former Deputy Leader of the Opposition of Tasmania. She was elected to the Tasmanian House of Assembly for the Labor Party in the Division of Braddon at the 2018 state election.

She was Mayor of Burnie from 2014 until 2017, and previously worked as a registered nurse.

Following Labor's loss at the 2021 state election, Labor leader Rebecca White and deputy leader Michelle O’Byrne resigned their positions. Dow was elected unopposed as deputy leader.

Dow was re-elected as Deputy Leader following the Labor Party's loss at the 2024 Tasmanian State Election, under new party leader Dean Winter.

Dow was re-elected at the 2025 Tasmanian state election.
