= Tasmanian House of Assembly =

Lower house of the Parliament of Tasmania

House of Assembly
- 52nd Parliament
- Coat of arms of Tasmania

Type
- Type: Lower House of the Parliament of Tasmania

History
- Founded: 2 December 1856; 169 years ago

Leadership
- Speaker: Jacquie Petrusma, Liberal since 19 August 2025
- Deputy Speaker: Helen Burnet, independent since 19 August 2025
- Leader of the House: Eric Abetz, Liberal since 10 April 2024
- Government Whip: Marcus Vermey, Liberal since 7 August 2025
- Leader of Opposition Business: Ella Haddad, Labor since 2025
- Opposition Whip: Meg Brown, Labor since 16 April 2024
- Leader of Greens Business: Vica Bayley, Greens since 23 April 2024
- Greens Whip: Vica Bayley, Greens since 23 April 2023

Structure
- Seats: 35
- Political groups: Government (14): Liberal (14); Opposition (10): Labor (10); Crossbench (11): Independent (6); Greens (4); Shooters, Fishers and Farmers (1)
- Length of term: 4 years

Elections
- Voting system: Proportional representation via Hare-Clark system (STV)
- Last election: 19 July 2025
- Next election: By 2029

Meeting place
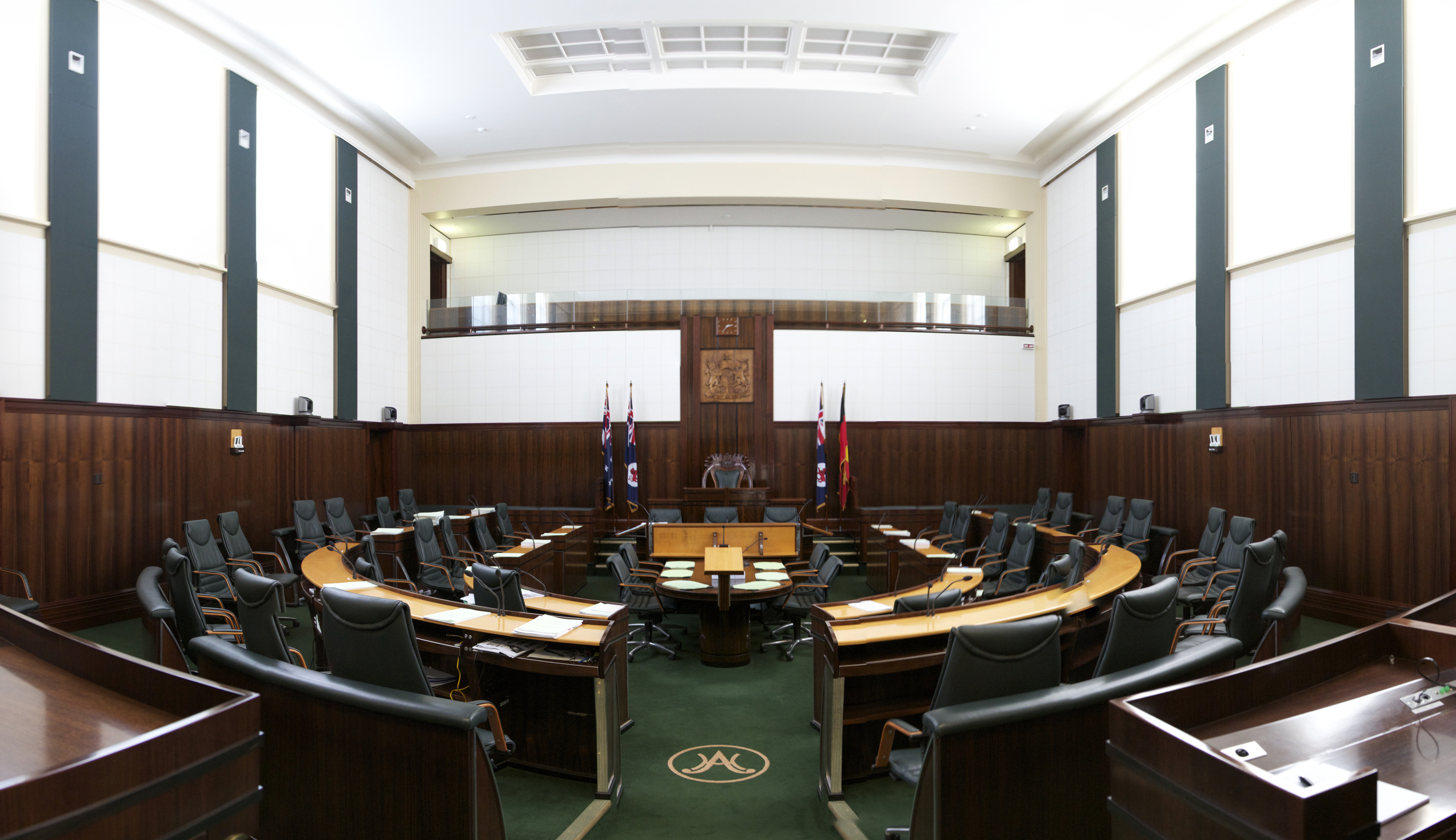

Website
- Tas House of Assembly

The House of Assembly is the lower house of the bicameral Parliament of Tasmania, the upper house being the Legislative Council. It sits in Parliament House in the state capital, Hobart.

The Assembly has 35 members, elected for a term of up to four years, (Note: Since 1976; prior to 1976, the maximum term of the Assembly was five years.) with seven members being elected in each of five electorates, called divisions. Each division has approximately the same number of electors, and shares its name with one of Tasmania's federal electoral divisions. Voting for the House of Assembly is by a form of proportional representation using the single transferable vote (STV), known as the Hare-Clark electoral system. By having multiple members for each division, the voting intentions of the electors are more closely represented in the House of Assembly. This system makes it all but certain that the division's minority party wins at least one seat. Additionally, it is easier for minor parties to enter the legislature than in the rest of Australia, allowing them to possibly exert influence through the balance of power (the need for a working majority in the assembly).

At the 2024 state election, the size of the House increased from 25 to 35 members, with seven members elected from the five divisions.

Since 2024, as well as previously from 1959–1998, the quota for election in each division, after distribution of preferences, has been 12.5% (one-eighth). Under the preferential proportional voting system in place, the lowest-polling candidates are eliminated, and their votes distributed as preferences to the remaining candidates. If a candidate achieves a quota, they are declared elected and any surplus votes (those over and above quota) are redistributed according to the next back-up preference marked by the voter.

Most legislation is initiated in the House of Assembly. The party or coalition with a majority of seats in the House of Assembly is invited by the Governor of Tasmania to form Government. The leader of that party becomes the Premier of Tasmania, and their senior colleagues become ministers responsible for various portfolios. As Australian politicians traditionally vote along party lines, most legislation introduced by the governing party will be passed by the House of Assembly.

Unlike other Australian state legislatures, the House of Assembly is elected from multimember districts while the Legislative Council is elected from single-member districts. The reverse is the case in most of the rest of Australia; that is, the lower house is elected from single-member districts while the upper house is elected from multi-member districts or at large.

Tasmania has therefore been described as having an upside down system to the rest of Australia.

== History ==
Year	Members
1856	30 seats
1870	32 seats
1885	36 seats
1893	37 seats
1900	35 seats
1906	30 seats
1959	35 seats
1998	25 seats
2024	35 seats

The House of Assembly was first established in 1856, under legislation passed by the British Parliament creating the independent self-governing Colony of Tasmania. The Legislative Council had already existed since 1852. The first elections for the House of Assembly were held in October 1856. The House first met on 2 December 1856 in the area that is now the parliamentary members lounge. The first House had members elected to represent 24 electorates. Hobart had five members, Launceston had three members, and the 22 other electorates each had one member.

In 1870 the multi-member districts were divided and all 32 members were elected in single-member districts.

In 1885 eight two-member districts were instituted. Three were in Hobart, two in Launceston, and there were three others. The remaining 20 members were elected in single-member districts. This number grew by one in 1893 when a seat was added for the West Coast.

In 1897 Tasmania was among the first jurisdictions in the world to use the Hare-Clark proportional representation system to elect some of its members. Hobart elected six members and Launceston four members, in city-wide districts. Voters cast only one vote each, but marked back-up preferences. STV was used again in 1900 in those two cities. By then a second member had been added to the West Coast, bringing total number of members up to 38.

In 1903 the first past the post system was used to elect each of the members.

In 1906 the state was divided into five equally represented multi-member electorates corresponding to the state's five federal electorates. Each electorate returned six members using STV.

In 1954, the state constitution was amended to introduce a new method to resolve political deadlocks. In the event of a deadlock in the 30-member House of Assembly, an Electoral Commission would be convened to determine a "majority party" and "minority party" on the basis of primary votes. The minority party would then have the right to nominate a member as Speaker of the Tasmanian House of Assembly, thereby giving the majority party a working majority of one MP. If the minority party did not nominate a speaker, the majority party would be entitled to nominate one of its own members as speaker and also to be awarded a supplementary member of parliament, again giving the majority party a working majority on the speaker's casting vote.

In 1959 the number of members per electorate was increased to seven. In 1998 it was reduced to five, resulting in a 25-member parliament. In this system, winning 15 seats, only two more than needed to govern, was considered a landslide.

The reduction was criticised by the Greens as an attempt to reduce their influence. In 2010, an attempt to increase the number of seats in the House back to 35 for the 2014 state election was made by the leaders of the three main parties — Labor, the Liberals and the Greens, who signed an agreement on 2 September of that year to submit the proposal for public consideration before taking a set of resolutions to their respective party rooms. The proposal, however, was dropped in February 2011 when the Liberal Party withdrew its support for the plan, citing budget circumstances.

In 2022 legislation was passed to return the House of Assembly to seven-seat districts with the passage of the Expansion of House of Assembly Act 2022, returning the House to 35 seats from the 2024 election onwards. The Legislative Council was not affected and retains 15 seats despite having also been reduced from 19 seats in 1998 at the same time as the House of Assembly.

Unlike most state parliaments in Australia, by-elections are very rare in the House of Assembly. Since 1917, casual vacancies have usually been filled by a simple recount of votes. One of the few by-elections (in legal terms a fresh or 're-election') in recent memory occurred in 1980, when the Supreme Court ordered a new election in Denison because three Labor members had exceeded spending limits.

== Committees ==
The House of Assembly maintains a number of parliamentary committees to scrutinise and analyse legislation.

=== Government Administration Committees ===
The Standing Committees on Government Administration have the following scope:

- Government Administration Committee A: Treasury; Macquarie Point Urban Renewal; Attorney-General; Justice, Corrections and Rehabilitation; Environment; Innovation, Science and the Digital Economy; Community and Multicultural Affairs; Arts and Heritage; Education; Children and Youth; Disability Services; Infrastructure and Transport; Local Government; Housing and Planning; and Small Business, Trade and Consumer Affairs.
- Government Administration Committee B: Health, Mental Health and Wellbeing; Ageing; Aboriginal Affairs; Police, Fire and Emergency Management; Skills and Jobs; Business, Industry and Resources; Energy and Renewables; Parks; Sport; Tourism, Hospitality and Events; Racing; Women and the Prevention of Family Violence; Primary Industries and Water; and Veterans’ Affairs.

Government Administration Committee A				Government Administration Committee B			
Party	Member	Position	Electorate	Party	Member	Position	Electorate
Labor	Brian Mitchell	Chair	Lyons	Labor	Ella Haddad	Chair	Clark
Greens	Tabatha Badger	Deputy Chair	Lyons	Independent	Kristie Johnston	Deputy Chair	Clark
Independent	Helen Burnet	Member	Clark	Labor	Meg Brown	Member	Franklin
Labor	Anita Dow	Member	Braddon	Independent	Peter George	Member	Franklin
Liberal	Michael Ferguson	Member	Bass	Liberal	Rob Fairs	Member	Bass
Liberal	Mark Shelton	Member	Lyons	Liberal	Roger Jaensch	Member	Braddon
Independent	David O'Byrne	Member	Franklin	Greens	Cecily Rosol	Member	Bass

=== Standing Committees ===
Standing Committee 1				Standing Committee 2			
Party	Member	Position	Electorate	Party	Member	Position	Electorate
N/A				N/A			
N/A				N/A			
N/A				N/A			
N/A				N/A			
N/A				N/A			
N/A				N/A			
N/A				N/A			

== Electorates ==
Tasmanian House of Assembly and Commonwealth House of Representatives electoral divisions

With seven members each, the five electoral divisions of the Tasmanian House of Assembly are:

- Bass
- Braddon
- Clark
- Franklin
- Lyons

The electorates of the Tasmanian House of Assembly have the same boundaries and names as the electorates for the federal House of Representatives.

== Members ==
=== Current distribution of seats ===
The distribution of seats is currently:

Party	Seats held	Percentage	Seat distribution
Liberal	14	40.0%	
Labor	10	28.6%	
Independent	6	17.1%	
Greens	4	11.4%	
Shooters, Fishers and Farmers	1	2.9%	

Electorate	Seats held
Bass	
Braddon	
Clark	
Franklin	
Lyons	

Liberal
Labor
Greens
Independent
Shooters, Fishers and Farmers

== See also ==
- Parliaments of the Australian states and territories
- List of Tasmanian House of Assembly casual vacancies
