= Janie Finlay =

Australian politician

Janie Finlay MP
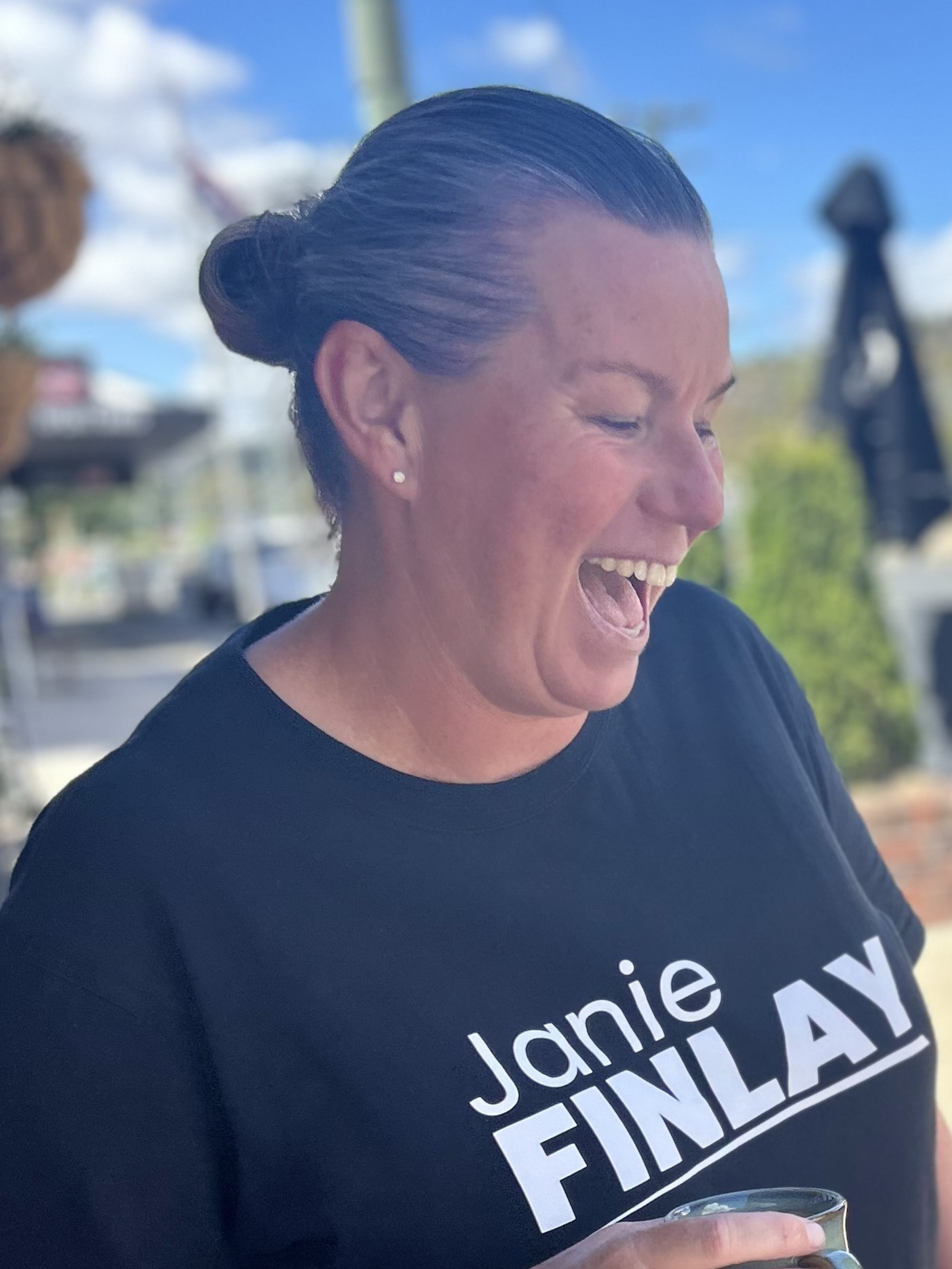
- Finlay in 2024

Deputy Leader of the Opposition in Tasmania
- Incumbent
- Assumed office 20 August 2025
- Premier: Jeremy Rockliff
- Leader: Josh Willie
- Preceded by: Anita Dow
Shadow portfolios Since 2025
Willie Shadow Ministry
2025–	Shadow Minister for Energy & Renewables
2025–	Shadow Minister for Parks, Environment and Climate Change
2025–	Shadow Minister for Primary Industries & Aquaculture
2025–	Shadow Minister for Innovation, Artificial Intelligence and the Digital Economy

Member of the Tasmanian House of Assembly for Bass
- Incumbent
- Assumed office 1 May 2021

Mayor of Launceston
- In office 22 February 2002 – 31 October 2005
- Preceded by: Annette Waddle
- Succeeded by: Ivan Dean

Personal details
- Born: Janie Dickenson; 2 August 1974 (age 51)
- Party: Labor

Janie Finlay (née Dickenson; born 2 August 1974) is an Australian politician representing the Division of Bass for Labor as a member of the Tasmanian House of Assembly.

Since the 2025 Tasmanian Labor Party leadership election, Finlay has served as deputy leader of the Tasmanian opposition and deputy leader of the Tasmanian Labor Party, replacing Anita Dow.

== Early life ==
Born in Launceston, Tasmania, Janie attended the University of Tasmania in Hobart at what is now the School of Creative Arts and Media.

Majoring in furniture design, she started her career running her own studio in Glebe, New South Wales.

She returned to Tasmania and took up a position with the Beacon Foundation as youth coordinator. Working at Launceston College she created programme at the Ashley Youth Detention Centre to help break the cycle of reoffending.

After securing backing from Federal and State Governments for her scheme, she then had to convince her local government of the merits of such a programme.

== Local Politics & Mayor of Launceston ==
After having her education plan for Ashley rebuffed by local council, she ran as a candidate and was duly elected to the Launceston City Council in 2000. From 2002 to 2005 served as Mayor. When Finlay was elected to that position in February 2002, at age 27, she was the youngest female mayor to serve in Australia.

She lost her mayoral position in the October 2005 elections to Ivan Dean by 441 votes after the distribution of preferences. She had been the favourite in her race for a second term, and on 26 October 2005, The Examiner local newspaper ran a front-page story claiming she was winning by 2,000 votes. But by the next day it was revealed Ivan Dean had secured the lead after preferences of two other candidates were distributed. Finlay was re-elected as a Councillor, securing almost two quotas of first preference votes. She resigned from council in 2007.

Finlay regained her position as Councillor on the Launceston City Council at the 2014 local government elections, securing almost a full quota of first preferences.

== State Parliament ==
In May 2021 Finlay was elected to the Tasmanian House of Assembly as a Labor representative for Bass.

As part of the opposition front bench, Finlay's portfolio included Primary Industries and Small Business.

In March 2024 Finlay retained her seat at the 2024 Tasmanian state election with an increase of 20% her votes.

Finlay was re-elected at the 2025 Tasmanian state election and was subsequently elected Deputy Labor Leader and Deputy Opposition leader at the following Leadership election for the state Labor party.

== Other interests ==
Janie served on the inaugural board of the Tasmania JackJumpers in 2020, helping to establish a state-wide National Basketball League team in Tasmania. She has also been a board member of the Launceston Tornadoes Women's Basketball team.

Civic offices
Preceded by Annette Waddle	Mayor of Launceston; 2002–2005	Succeeded by Ivan Dean
