= Shane Broad =

Australian politician, rower, and agricultural scientist

Shane Broad MP

Member of the Tasmanian House of Assembly for Braddon
- Incumbent
- Assumed office 4 April 2017 Serving with 6 others
- Preceded by: Bryan Green
Shadow portfolios Since 2025
Willie Shadow Ministry
| 2025– | Shadow Minister for Building and Construction |
| 2025– | Shadow Minister for Consumer Affairs |
| 2025– | Shadow Minister for Resources |

Personal details
- Born: 21 August 1974 (age 51) Burnie, Tasmania, Australia
- Party: Labor Party
- Children: 3
- Education: University of Tasmania
- Occupation: Agricultural scientist, rower

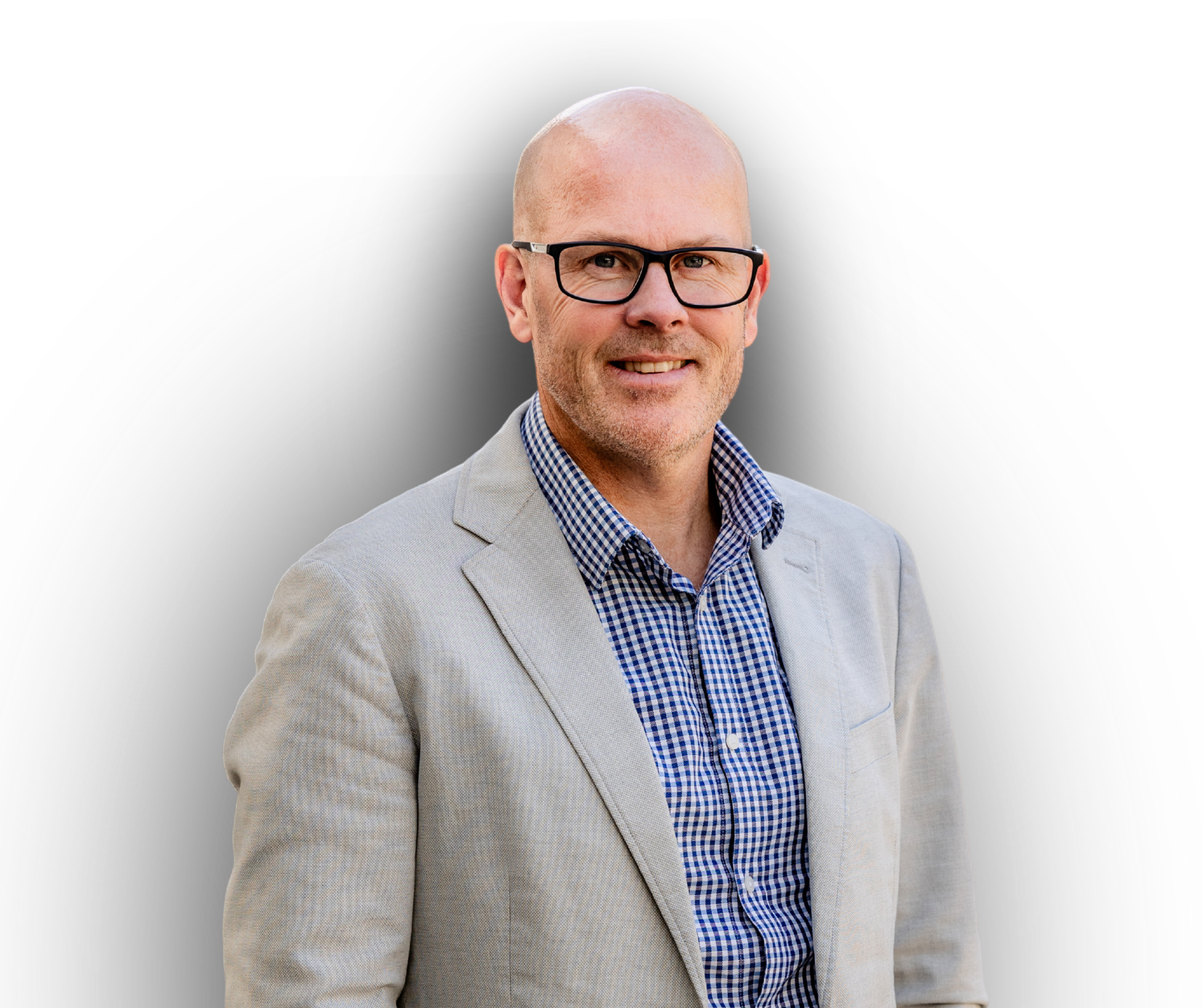
Shane Broad, Tasmanian MP – official profile portrait

Medal record

Men's rowing

Representing Australia

World Rowing Championships
| Bronze medal – third place | 2000 Zagreb | LM8+ |
| Silver medal – second place | 2003 Milan | LM4x |

Shane Thomas Broad (born 21 August 1974) is an Australian politician; a five-time national champion and Australian representative rower; and an agricultural scientist.

== Early life ==
Broad grew up on a farm at Gawler, attended Ulverstone Primary School, Ulverstone High School and Don College. He was also an exchange student to the Faroe Islands with AFS.

== Club and state rowing ==
Broad started rowing at age 14 at the Ulverstone Rowing Club in north west Tasmania. When attending university in Hobart he moved to the Huon Rowing Club at Franklin in southern Tasmania, where most of his senior rowing was based.

He was selected and rowed in Tasmanian representative men's lightweight fours contesting the Penrith Cup at the Interstate Regatta within the Australian Rowing Championships from 1995 to 2003. Those Tasmanian fours were victorious in 1999, 2000, 2001, 2002 and 2003.

== International representative rowing ==
Broad was in the Australian lightweight rowing squad and competed at World Rowing Championships from 2000 to 2003. He made his Australian representative debut in the Australian men's lightweight eight at the World Rowing Cup III in Lucerne. Later that year at the 2000 World Rowing Championships in Zagreb, he won a bronze medal in the three seat of the lightweight men's eight.

In 2001 he raced in a lightweight coxless four at the World Rowing Cup IV in Munich and then at the 2001 World Rowing Championships in Lucerne he doubled-up in the lightweight eight and in a coxless four. Both boats finished outside of medal contention. In 2002 he rowed with Matt Russell in the Australian lightweight coxless pair. They competed at the World Rowing Cup III and then at the 2002 World Rowing Championships in Seville where they finished in overall ninth place.

At the 2003 World Rowing Championships in Milan, he won silver in the lightweight men's quad scull. It was his final national representative appearance.

== Professional career ==
Broad worked as an agricultural scientist for the University of Tasmania.

== Political career ==
Broad was a councillor on the Central Coast Council. He ran as a Labor candidate for Braddon at the 2010 and 2014 Tasmanian state elections, but was not elected. When state Labor leader Bryan Green resigned from politics in March 2017, the Tasmanian Electoral Commission conducted a recount of the 2014 ballot papers excluding Green, and declared Broad elected to the Tasmanian House of Assembly on 4 April.

Broad was re-elected at the 2025 Tasmanian state election.
