= Rebecca White =

Australian politician

The Honourable Rebecca White MP
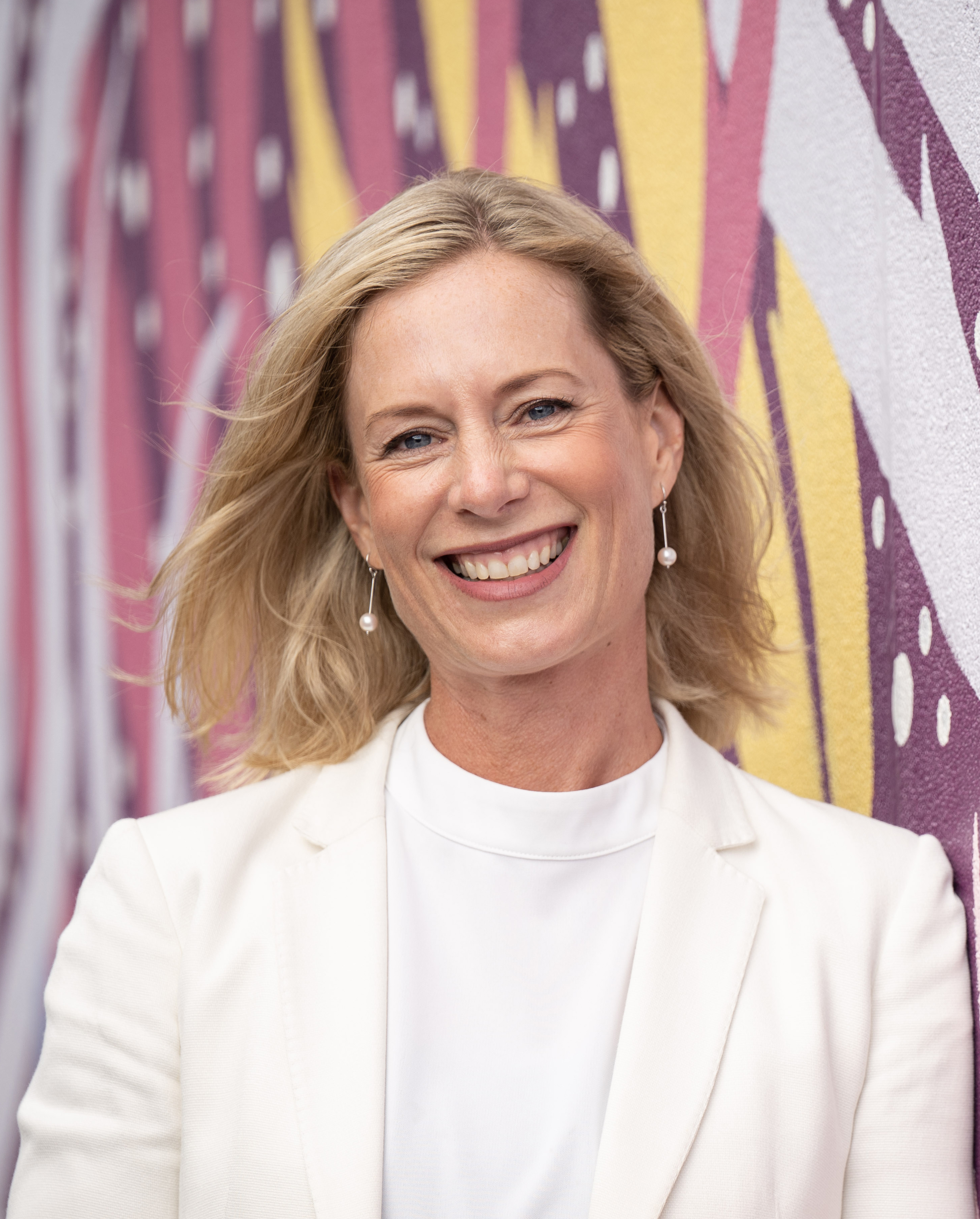
- White in 2023

Assistant Minister for Health and Aged Care
- Incumbent
- Assumed office 13 May 2025
- Prime Minister: Anthony Albanese
- Preceded by: Ged Kearney

Assistant Minister for Indigenous Health
- Incumbent
- Assumed office 13 May 2025
- Prime Minister: Anthony Albanese
- Preceded by: Ged Kearney

Assistant Minister for Women
- Incumbent
- Assumed office 13 May 2025
- Prime Minister: Anthony Albanese
- Preceded by: Kate Thwaites

Member of the Australian Parliament for Lyons
- Incumbent
- Assumed office 3 May 2025
- Preceded by: Brian Mitchell

51st Leader of the Opposition in Tasmania
- In office 7 July 2021 – 10 April 2024
- Premier: Peter Gutwein; Jeremy Rockliff
- Deputy: Anita Dow
- Preceded by: David O'Byrne
- Succeeded by: Dean Winter
- In office 17 March 2017 – 15 May 2021
- Premier: Will Hodgman; Peter Gutwein
- Deputy: Michelle O'Byrne
- Preceded by: Bryan Green
- Succeeded by: David O'Byrne

Member of the Tasmanian House of Assembly for Lyons
- In office 20 March 2010 – 12 February 2025
- Succeeded by: Casey Farrell

Personal details
- Born: Rebecca Peta White; 4 February 1983 (age 43) Hobart, Tasmania, Australia
- Party: Labor
- Children: 2
- Education: University of Tasmania
- Occupation: Politician
- Website: www.becwhite.com

Rebecca Peta White (born 4 February 1983) is an Australian politician. She was elected to the House of Representatives at the 2025 federal election, representing the Australian Labor Party (ALP) and the Tasmanian seat of Lyons. She was previously leader of the Tasmanian Labor Party from 2017 to 2021 and 2021 to 2024, leading the party to three state elections. She is an assistant minister in three portfolios of the second Albanese ministry.

White was raised in Nugent, Tasmania, and completed arts and commerce degrees at the University of Tasmania. She joined the ALP at a young age and subsequently worked as a political adviser until her own election to parliament at the 2010 state election.

White was elected unopposed as state leader of the ALP in March 2017. She led the party to defeat at the 2018 election, although increasing the party's vote and number of seats. At the 2021 election, the party's vote went backwards and she subsequently resigned as party leader. White was succeeded in the role by David O'Byrne, who resigned after less than a month due to sexual harassment allegations. She subsequently returned as party leader, remaining in the role until her resignation after the 2024 election, which resulted in a hung Parliament with Labor declining to seek to form an administration.

White resigned from the Tasmanian House of Assembly in February 2025 to stand for federal parliament. She was elected to the federal seat of Lyons at the 2025 election and was subsequently appointed as an assistant minister in the Albanese government.

== Early life and education ==
White grew up in Nugent, Tasmania, northeast of Hobart as a sixth generation Tasmanian. She attended Sorell School, Rosny College and the University of Tasmania, where she studied journalism, political science, and international business management and marketing. She graduated with Bachelor of Arts and Bachelor of Commerce degrees in 2004. She then worked as a political adviser for Labor MP for Denison Duncan Kerr and later Senator Carol Brown, and was Vice President of Tasmanian Young Labor.

== Political career ==
=== State politics ===
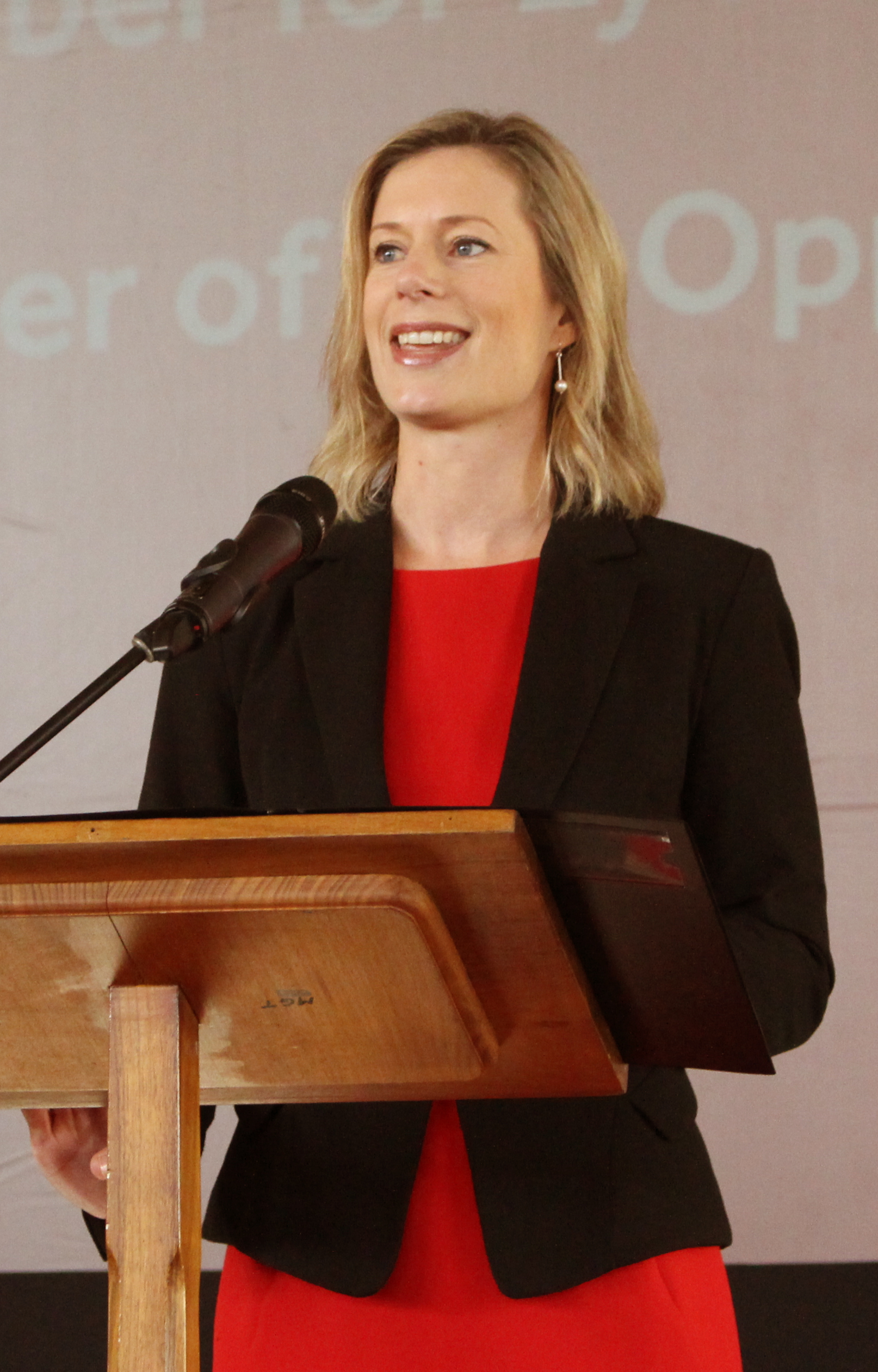
White in 2017

For the 2010 Tasmanian state election, White was endorsed as one of the Labor candidates for Lyons. Her campaign focused on "renewal", pointing out that sitting MPs Michael Polley and David Llewellyn had both been in the parliament for over twenty years. Her advertising made use of Polly Waffle wrappers, "Pollywaffle" being a disparaging nickname for Polley. At the election, White narrowly defeated Llewellyn for the second Labor seat (also defeating the third sitting MP, Heather Butler).

White is aligned with Labor Left.

On 12 February 2025, White resigned from state parliament to focus on her federal election campaign. White was succeeded in the House of Assembly by Casey Farrell.

==== Opposition leader (2017–2024) ====
At a party meeting on 17 March 2017, Bryan Green resigned as Tasmanian Labor leader. White was elected leader unopposed, and hence Leader of the Opposition.

Almost immediately the Liberal Party went on the attack, releasing a fake CV titled "Student, party hack and MP" referencing White's youth and that she has never worked outside politics. White also expressed the hope that Shane Broad would fill the newly vacated seat, and promised to bring him into the ministry. Because of this the Liberals accused her of bribery, and referred her to the Tasmanian Electoral Commission. White responded that this stance "defies common sense".

White announced in December 2017 that under a Labor government she would phase out pokies in pubs and clubs thus breaking the decades long monopoly of Federal Hotels. The reason given was to protect people with mental health issues and the lower socio-economic strata, both of whom are susceptible to pokies addictions. Tasmanians lose over $110 million on pokies every year. This phase out would take until 2023, and would come with a package to help pubs and clubs transition to other forms of revenue. Following the election, White and the Labor party backtracked on their commitment to block the new licences under pressure from the federal party.

In February 2018, she declared the ALP would not be supporting the Liberals in attempting to re-introduce the state's anti-protest laws. White promised in the campaign to fund abortion clinics, after the Liberal government cut all funds to them. At the election in March, White led Labor to a three-seat gain, while paring the Liberals back to a bare majority of one seat.

White led Labor to another defeat in the 2021 election and subsequently resigned as leader. Following the resignation of the new party leader David O'Byrne just three weeks into the job, after sexual harassment claims against him, White was re-elected as party leader on 7 July 2021.

White led the ALP to a fourth consecutive defeat at the 2024 election, after which she resigned as leader. White was succeeded as Labor leader by Franklin MP Dean Winter.

=== Federal politics ===
In November 2024, White was announced by Prime Minister Anthony Albanese to be the Labor Party's candidate for the federal seat of Lyons at the 2025 Australian federal election.

White won the seat of Lyons at the 2025 election, recording a swing to the Labor Party of 10% in the electorate. White succeeds Brian Mitchell as Labor's Member for Lyons.

Following White’s election win, Tasmanian Liberal Premier Jeremy Rockliff endorsed White for a federal cabinet position in the incoming Albanese government.

On 13 May 2025, White was appointed as Assistant Minister for Women, Assistant Minister for Indigenous Health and Assistant Minister for Health and Aged Care in the second Albanese ministry.

== Personal life ==
White married Rod Dann in November 2017. She has one daughter, Mia, and a son, Hudson. Mia was less than a year old when White was elevated to the leadership, and was regularly with White on the campaign trail in 2017. In February 2021, White revealed that she was expecting a second child, due in June 2021.

In November 2024, White travelled to the United States to campaign for the Kamala Harris 2024 presidential campaign.

== See also ==
- 2018 Tasmanian state election

Political offices
Preceded by Cassy O'Connor	Minister for Human Services; 2014	Succeeded by Jacquie Petrusma
Preceded by Bryan Green	Leader of the Opposition (Tasmania); 2017–2021	Succeeded by David O'Byrne
Preceded by David O'Byrne	Leader of the Opposition (Tasmania); 2021–2024	Succeeded by Dean Winter
Party political offices
Preceded by Bryan Green	Leader of the Labor Party in Tasmania; 2017–2021	Succeeded by David O'Byrne
Preceded by David O'Byrne	Leader of the Labor Party in Tasmania; 2021–2024	Succeeded by Dean Winter
Parliament of Australia
Preceded by Brian Mitchell	Member for Lyons; 2025–present	Incumbent
