= Dean Winter =

Australian politician (born 1985)

Dean Winter MP
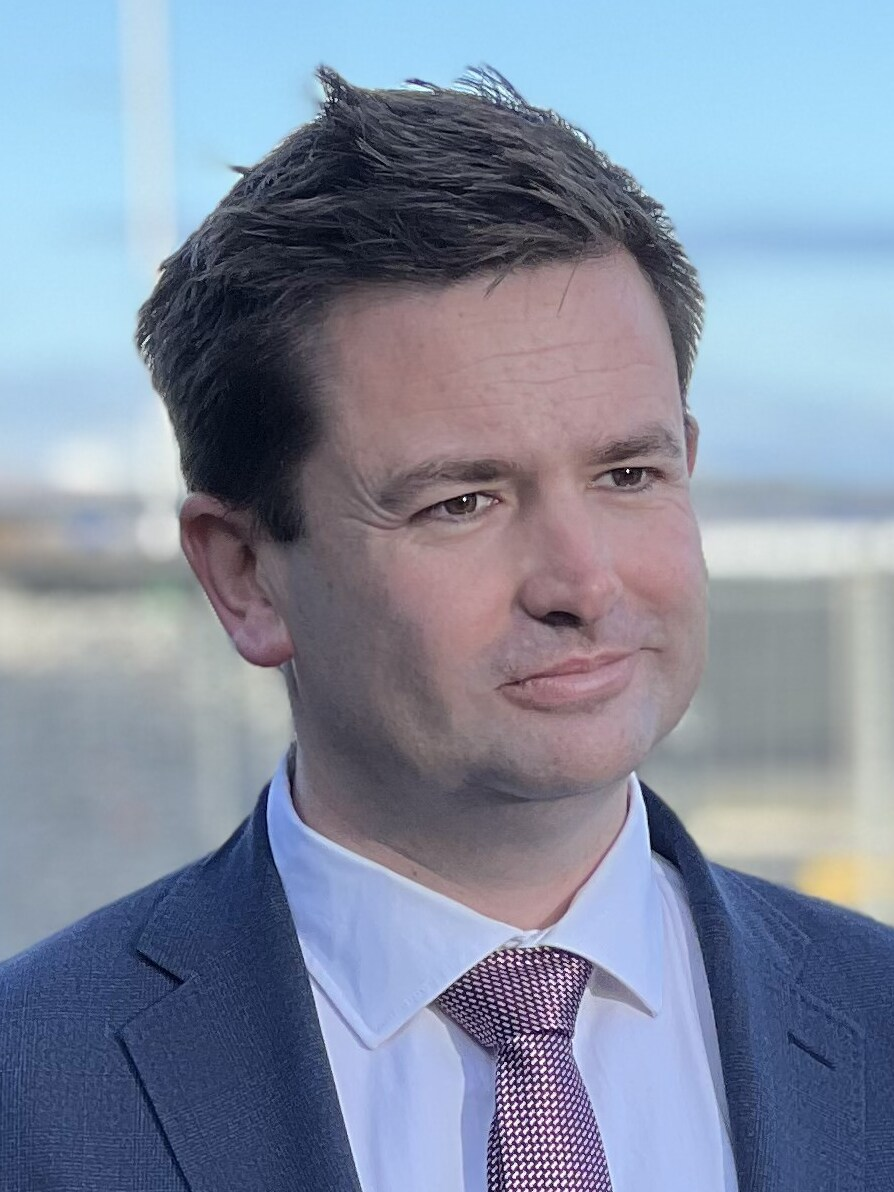

Member of the Tasmanian House of Assembly for Franklin
- Incumbent
- Assumed office 1 May 2021 Serving with 6 others

Leader of the Opposition in Tasmania
- In office 10 April 2024 – 20 August 2025
- Premier: Jeremy Rockliff
- Deputy: Anita Dow
- Preceded by: Rebecca White
- Succeeded by: Josh Willie

Personal details
- Born: 4 May 1985 (age 41) Hobart, Tasmania, Australia
- Party: Labor

Shadow portfolios Since 2025

Willie Shadow Ministry
- 2025–: Shadow Treasurer
- 2025–: Shadow Minister for Planning
- 2025–: Shadow Minister for Racing

Dean Winter (born 4 May 1985) is an Australian politician. He has been a member of the Tasmanian House of Assembly since the 2021 state election, representing Franklin for the Labor Party. He previously served as the Leader of the Opposition in Tasmania and as leader of the Tasmanian Labor Party from April 2024 to August 2025. He was earlier elected as Mayor of Kingborough Council in 2018.

Following the resignation of Tasmanian Labor Party leader Rebecca White, Winter was elected unopposed as her successor on 10 April 2024.

After successfully moving a motion of no-confidence in the Premiership of Jeremy Rockliff, who had governed in minority since the preceding 2024 election, Winter led Labor into the 2025 Tasmanian state election, where the party maintained its 10 seats in the House of Assembly, but recorded its lowest primary vote in over 100 years. After moving an unsuccessful no confidence motion against Jeremy Rockliff and his government which failed to gain any crossbench support, Winter was defeated in a leadership spill and replaced as leader of the Tasmanian Labor Party by Josh Willie on 20 August 2025. He was subsequently appointed as a shadow minister, while continuing to represent the electorate of Franklin.

== Early life and education ==
Winter was born in Hobart while his family was living on Tasmania's West Coast where his father Murray worked as a miner for the Mount Lyell Mining and Railway Company. Winter's parents met in Queenstown where his mother Margaret worked as a nurse at the Queenstown hospital. Margaret Winter is a descendant of William and Susanna Powell who, after arriving in Tasmania around 1850, married and settled in Deloraine. Their son Francis moved to Queenstown in 1896 to work at Mount Lyell, before his son, and Winter's grandfather Les also worked at Mount Lyell. The family moved to Hobart when Dean was five. He suffered from a serious stutter as a child. The impairment was so bad his family travelled to Brisbane to seek specialist help, living in a caravan for six weeks.

Winter attended St Aloysius Catholic College, St Virgil's College and the University of Tasmania. While at University, Winter undertook a cadetship at the Department of Treasury and Finance.

Winter's first job at the age of 15 was working as a service station attendant after being hired by Nic Street's father. He later worked as a deli assistant at Woolworths.

== Pre-parliamentary career ==
Winter was hired as an electorate officer for Labor MP and Tasmanian treasurer Michael Aird. He then worked in the Tasmanian Government Media Office before taking a role with Federal Labor MP Julie Collins.

He subsequently became the chief executive officer of TasICT, the peak body representing Tasmania's ICT sector. This coincided with the National Broadband Network rollout in Tasmania which subsequently became an issue in Tasmania at the 2013 Australian federal election. Winter and TasICT argued the Tasmanian rollout should be completed using Fibre to the Premises (FttP) technology, while the Coalition had already announced it would use a mix of technologies, including Fibre to the Node (FttN), which they said would be easier and more affordable to deploy.

Following the 2018 Tasmanian state election, Winter was appointed senior economic adviser to Opposition leader Rebecca White.

== Political career ==
Following an unsuccessful candidacy for the Electoral division of Hobart at the 2012 Tasmanian Legislative Council periodic election, Winter successfully contested the Kingborough Council election for the position of Councillor in 2014. The Labor Left faction attempted to censure Winter later in 2018, due to comments Winter made around Kingborough Council's behaviour being "authoritarian" in regards to an overturned decision that was made to destroy a dog, which were interpreted as anti-worker. Winter said that his criticism was aimed "at the leadership of council, not its staff". The censure attempt was unsuccessful, with White intervening to stop the issue from being addressed at the party conference. Winter ultimately won the Kingborough mayoral election, held later that year, with 61.93% of the vote becoming youngest Kingborough Mayor ever.

At the 2021 Tasmanian state election, Winter was endorsed as one of the Labor candidates. He was initially denied preselection in the seat of Franklin for the 2021 Tasmanian state election, with the Labor Left rumoured to be opposed to him becoming a candidate. Former Labor premier David Bartlett labelled Winter an "outstanding candidate", and that by not preselecting him, Labor was effectively conceding the election. Former Premiers Paul Lennon and Lara Giddings also expressed support for his candidacy.

Winter ended up being preselected as the sixth candidate for Franklin, following intervention from the party's national executive. Winter was ultimately elected as one of two Labor MPs in Franklin, beating incumbent MP Alison Standen, and outperforming then-Labor MP David O'Byrne.

Winter is aligned with Labor Right and is a member of the AWU. Winter used to support privatisation in 2015, however by 2025 he opposes it.

In August 2025, after relinquishing the Labor leadership, Winter was appointed Shadow Treasurer by his successor, Josh Willie.

== Opposition leader (2024–2025) ==
Winter was elected unopposed to replace Rebecca White as Tasmanian Labor leader, following the party's defeat at the 2024 Tasmanian state election.

On becoming leader, Winter announced that the Tasmanian Labor Party would focus on policies that create and protect jobs. He also changed the party's position on the controversial Macquarie Point Stadium project, saying that ″A stadium will mean thousands of jobs in construction, including hundreds of apprenticeships.″

Following his Budget Reply speech on 3 June 2025, Winter introduced a motion of no confidence against Premier Jeremy Rockliff on 4 June 2025. Winter secured support from the Tasmanian Greens and three crossbench members: Craig Garland, Kristie Johnston, and Andrew Jenner. He rejected a Greens' amendment that referenced the economic impact of funding the Macquarie Point Stadium. The motion passed the House of Assembly 18–17 on 5 June 2025, with Labor Speaker Michelle O'Byrne casting the decisive vote. The supporting coalition comprised 10 Labor MPs, 5 Greens MPs, and the three crossbench members, while 14 Liberal MPs and 3 independents voted against the motion.

The successful motion triggered speculation about Tasmania's fourth state election in seven years. On 7 June 2025, Greens' Leader Rosalie Woodruff wrote to Winter offering supply and confidence to enable him to form government, stating that ″Tasmanians don't want an election, and neither do the Greens.″

Winter was re-elected as a member for Franklin at the 2025 Tasmanian state election.

As the newly formed Parliament resumed, Winter once again called for a motion of no confidence, which was not backed by any other party or independent, with only the Labor party voting yes.

On 20 August 2025, Winter was deposed as leader of the Tasmanian Labor Party after a caucus meeting. He was replaced by Josh Willie.

== Personal life ==
Winter married his wife, Allison, in 2014. He has one daughter, Harriet, and a son, George.

Political offices
Preceded by Rebecca White	Leader of the Opposition (Tasmania); 2024–2025	Succeeded by Josh Willie
Party political offices
Preceded by Rebecca White	Leader of the Labor Party in Tasmania; 2024–2025	Succeeded by Josh Willie
