= Tasmanian Labor Party =

Affiliate of the Labor Party in Tasmania

Tasmanian Labor Party Australian Labor Party (Tasmanian Branch)
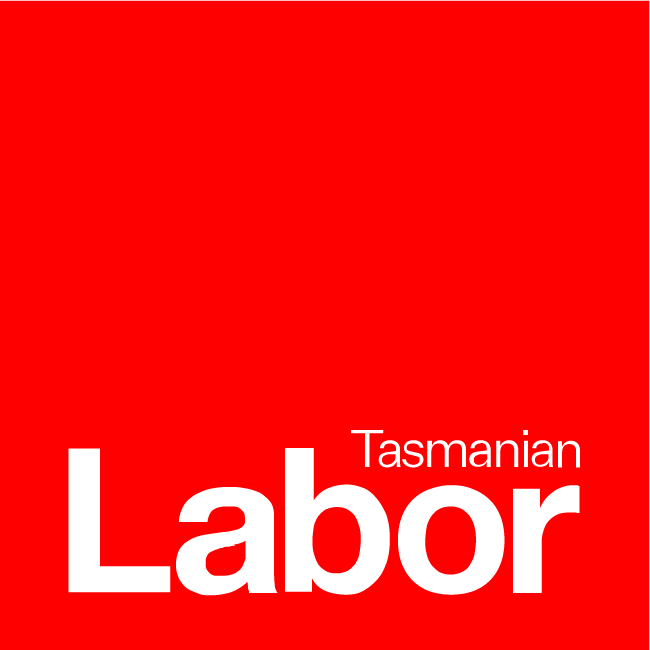
- Leader: Josh Willie
- Deputy Leader: Janie Finlay
- Secretary: Stuart Benson
- Founded: June 1903; 123 years ago
- Headquarters: 63 Salamanca Place, Battery Point, Hobart, Tasmania
- Youth wing: Tasmanian Young Labor
- Women's wing: Labor Women's Network
- LGBT wing: Rainbow Labor
- Ideology: Social democracy
- Political position: Centre-left
- National affiliation: Australian Labor
- Colours: Red
- House of Assembly: 10 / 35
- Legislative Council: 3 / 15
- House of Representatives: 4 / 5 (Tasmanian seats)
- Senate: 5 / 12 (Tasmanian seats)

Website
- taslabor.com

Seats in local government
- Burnie City: 3 / 9
- Clarence City: 2 / 12
- Derwent Valley: 1 / 8
- Hobart City: 1 / 12
- Huon Valley: 1 / 9
- Spring Bay: 1 / 8

The Tasmanian Labor Party, commonly referred to simply as Tasmanian Labor, (Note: officially known as the Australian Labor Party (Tasmanian Branch)) is a social democratic political party in Tasmania. It is the Tasmanian branch of the Australian Labor Party. Following the 2025 Tasmanian state election, the party is led by Josh Willie, and since 2014 has formed the official opposition in Tasmania, losing 5 consecutive state elections.

== History ==
=== Late beginnings (until 1903) ===
The Labor Party came into existence in Tasmania later than in the mainland states, in part due to the weak state of nineteenth-century Tasmanian trade unionism compared to the rest of the country. The two main Trades and Labor Councils, in Hobart and Launceston, were badly divided along north–south lines, and were always small; they collapsed altogether in 1897 (Hobart) and 1898 (Launceston). Denis Murphy attributes the poor state of the unions to a number of factors, including a more conservative workforce, divisions between various groups of workers, the smaller nature of Tasmanian industry, heavy penalties directed against a prominent early union leader, Hugh Kirk, and a lack of job security for the miners on the north-west coast. Unofficial pro-Labor candidates contested parliamentary seats from 1886. Allan MacDonald was elected at the 1893 election and has been regarded as Tasmania's first Labor member, but was not himself a worker and in any case was shortly forced to retire due to ill-health. Numerous other candidates from liberal or democratic leagues were elected, but often showed little regard for workers' issues.

As a result of these issues, there was no state Labor Party by the time of Federation, and as such there was no formal Labor campaign in Tasmania at the 1901 federal election. King O'Malley was elected as an independent in the House of Representatives, and David O'Keefe was elected to the Senate endorsed by the Protectionist Party. O'Keefe joined the Labor Party when parliament sat for the first time, and O'Malley arrived unpledged but joined in June after the anti-Labor parties refused to support his idea for a Commonwealth Bank. George Mason Burns, secretary of the Queenstown branch of the Amalgamated Miners' Association, convened a small conference in September 1901, chaired by future Premier John Earle, which drew up a moderate Labor platform, and a Political Labor League formed on the north-west coast. However, there was understood to be no Labor organisation in Tasmania as late as 1902.

=== Forming a parliamentary party (1903–1906) ===
By 1903, a Labor campaign for the 1903 state election started to take shape with a view to forming a parliamentary party. The need to form a national Labor Party saw various mainland Labor Party figures visiting the state to build support, and a visit by the British trade unionist Tom Mann led to the formation of a Hobart Workers' Political League. Pre-election votes were taken to determine Labor candidates in the four seats of the north-west coast, and candidates signed a pledge to support a platform. Murphy describes this campaign as heavily dependent on interstate support and offering little more than the Liberals on policy. Three Labor candidates won seats at the election: Burns, James Long and William Lamerton, and formed the first Labor caucus in state parliament.

The first Labor Party conference was held in June 1903, and future Premier John Earle became the first party president. A fourth MP, Jens Jensen, took the Labor pledge at the conference. The new branch faced further problems due to the need to campaign for the 1903 federal election in December, a campaign which suffered from severe financial difficulties and sluggish organising. O'Malley was re-elected, but Labor candidates for the Senate and the seat of Denison were defeated. The support of Lamerton, a former mine manager, was described by The Mercury as "equivocal"; he drifted away from the party in their first term and became an opponent.

=== Earle leadership (1906–1917) ===
The party continued to struggle organisationally and financially, but a more determined campaign, again featuring strong interstate support, saw the party return seven MPs at the 1906 state election. Earle was elected as the first Tasmanian Labor leader after the election, Labor having declined to elect a leader during their first term. Labor suffered a blow when O'Keefe was defeated in the Senate at the 1906 federal election, and lost further votes at the 1909 state election—at which, however, they increased their MPs to twelve out of thirty due to the introduction of the Hare-Clark electoral system. Earle would form Tasmania's first Labor government on 20 October, after a no-confidence motion ousted the anti-Labor fusion government of Elliott Lewis. Jensen, Long and James Ogden were appointed to Earle's ministry, but the new government, lacking a majority, was ousted after only seven days.

Earle remained Labor leader in opposition, and assumed the Premiership in 1914 in a minority government with the support of independent Joshua Whitsitt, but his government was defeated at the 1916 Tasmanian state election in April 1916. Among the government's achievements were the establishment of the state's Hydro-Electric Department (now Hydro Tasmania). Earle continued as Opposition Leader until November that year, when he quit the leadership and the party as part of the Australian Labor Party split of 1916 split over conscription. His deputy, Joseph Lyons, assumed the leadership in the wake of the party split and Earle's departure.

=== Lyons leadership (1917–1929) ===
Labor could not return to power in the 1922 election, but Lyons became Premier the following year after the disintegration of the Nationalist Party administration, and he led Labor to a majority in the 1925 election. Lyons' premiership saw him abandon radicalism in favour of pragmatism, and was able to secure a reasonable level of finance from the federal government. He also managed to obtain approval from the state's Administrator for a budget which had been blocked by the Tasmanian Legislative Council, although the Council retained its right to block supply in the subsequent constitutional settlement. Lyons and Labor were defeated in the 1928 election.

=== Ogilvie leadership (1929–1939) ===
Former state Attorney-General Albert Ogilvie succeeded Lyons as Labor leader in the circumstances of Tasmania being badly affected by the Great Depression. Ogilvie initially struggled to make an impact, flirting with Lang Labor, briefly disaffiliating from the federal party and suffering a defeat in the 1931 election. However, he led Labor back into government in the 1934 election, and proceeded to embark on a programme of public works and reversing budget cuts, securing the party a landslide win in the 1937 election and helping to set the stage for a 35 year period of unbroken Labor rule in Tasmania from 1934 to 1969. Ogilvie died whilst still in office in 1939.

=== Dwyer-Gray, Cosgrove, and Brooker leaderships (1939–1958) ===
Ogilvie was briefly succeeded by Edmund Dwyer-Gray, who served a six-month stint as Premier before handing over to Robert Cosgrove, a grocer who dominated the state's politics for 19 years, save for a brief interruption when he was put on trial on corruption charges, when he was replaced by Edward Brooker. Although Labor and the Liberals were often finely balanced in the 30-member House of Assembly, Cosgrove was able to secure governing majorities through his skillful handling of independent members, before expanding the number of House members to 35. A devout Catholic, Cosgrove was also able to minimise the Tasmanian impact of the Australian Labor Party split of 1955 over attitudes towards the influence of the Communist Party in the trade union movement.

=== Reece leadership (1958–1975) ===
Cosgrove's successor, Eric Reece, emphasized economic development and the expansion of hydroelectricity production during his premiership. He suffered a surprise defeat in the 1969 election, ending Labor's 35-year run in office in Tasmania. Although he was able to lead the party back into government at the next election in 1972, he stepped down from office in 1975.

=== Neilson, Lowe, Holgate, and Batt leaderships (1975–1989) ===
Reece's replacement, Bill Neilson, had to deal with the 1975 Australian constitutional crisis leading to the fall of Prime Minister Gough Whitlam, as well as the struggle between the state and federal parties regarding the expulsion of right-winger Brian Harradine. Neilson's tenure as leader also saw democratisation and reform of the party, with the elimination of bogus branches and the establishment of the state council to replace the old state conference, leading to the rise of the Broad Left faction which then controlled the party for a decade. Neilson led the party to victory in the 1976 election but then retired, being succeeded by the younger Doug Lowe. Lowe secured a comfortable victory for Labor in the 1979 election, but his premiership was undone by the Franklin Dam controversy when his attempt to backtrack on the proposal by proposing an alternative location for the dam further up the Gordon River alienated both left-wing unions and the conservative Legislative Council.

Going into the 1982 Tasmanian state election in May 1982, the Labor Party had lost its majority and faced bitter internal divisions, with former leader and Premier Lowe sitting on the crossbench as an independent and heavily critical of his successor Harry Holgate. Ken Wriedt, former federal Minister for Foreign Affairs during the Whitlam government, announced his candidacy for state parliament and was immediately talked about as a potential Premier in the event of a close election if Holgate was unable to secure a majority due to his hostile relationship with the crossbench. Labor lost the election badly, but Wriedt was elected to the House of Assembly with a far higher personal vote than Holgate and was immediately touted as a potential successor. Days later, Holgate announced that he would stand down as leader and Wriedt was elected unopposed as his successor, becoming Opposition Leader.

The Labor Party was again defeated at the 1986 Tasmanian state election, performing poorly and failing to regain any seats it had lost in 1982. Wriedt stepped down following the election loss, and Neil Batt, a former Deputy Premier under Lowe and national president of the party, was elected unopposed to replace him.

=== Field leadership (1988–1997) ===
In December 1988, deputy leader Michael Field ousted Batt, who had been lagging in the polls, as party leader in a closely divided 8-7 leadership spill. Field led Labor into the 1989 Tasmanian state election, at which they won less seats than the governing Liberal Party, but were able to oust them to form minority government with the support of the Tasmanian Greens in an agreement known as the Accord. After a term in which the new government faced an economic recession and a fraught relationship with the Greens, the Field government was soundly defeated at the 1992 Tasmanian state election. Field remained Leader of the Opposition until 1997, when he decided to leave politics entirely.

=== Bacon, Lennon, Bartlett, and Giddings leaderships (1997–2014) ===
Jim Bacon, a former secretary of the Tasmanian Trades & Labor Council, assumed the Labor and Opposition leadership from Field in 1997. He led the party back into government, winning the 1998 Tasmanian state election, after campaigning against the privatisation of Hydro Tasmania which had been proposed by the Liberals, and being returned in a landslide at the 2002 Tasmanian state election. However, Bacon was diagnosed with inoperable lung cancer and resigned from politics in February 2004, dying in June that year. Bacon's deputy, Paul Lennon, assumed the leadership after Bacon's resignation and led the party to a third term at the 2006 Tasmanian state election, but resigned in May 2008 amidst poor polling.

David Bartlett succeeded Lennon as Premier and Labor leader and led the party to a tied result at the 2010 Tasmanian state election, with Labor losing their majority. He continued as Premier after the election in a minority government with the support of the Tasmanian Greens, but resigned in May 2011 and was succeeded by his deputy, Lara Giddings. Giddings led the party in government until their defeat at the 2014 Tasmanian state election.

=== Opposition (since 2014) ===
Giddings resigned after Labor and the Greens lost government at the 2014 election and long-serving minister and former deputy leader Bryan Green assumed the Labor leadership in opposition. After consistently trailing the Liberal government of Will Hodgman in the polls, Green abruptly resigned from the leadership and from parliament in March 2017. He was succeeded as Labor and Opposition Leader by Rebecca White, who led Labor to a narrow election loss at the 2018 Tasmanian state election, winning 3 seats back and reducing the Liberals to the smallest possible majority.

After losing the 2021 election, White and her deputy Michelle O'Byrne stood down from their leadership positions. Michelle's brother David O'Byrne defeated Shane Broad in a ballot to succeed White, but resigned as leader after less than a month following allegations of historical sexual harassment. White was then re-elected as leader.

In July 2022, the ALP National Executive assumed control over the operations of the Tasmanian branch, with the state conference and administrative committee placed into suspension and former senators Doug Cameron and Nick Sherry appointed as administrators. ALP national secretary Paul Erickson stated that the National Executive had intervened for the purposes of "improving the culture of the branch, reinstating trust, respect, transparency and a party-first approach to internal decision-making". The administration ended in 2024, but as of May 2025, a new administrative committee had not yet been appointed, with the National Executive continuing to make all pre-selection decisions in the interim.

After the 2024 Tasmanian state election, party leader Rebecca White announced she was stepping down from the position after three consecutive election losses for the party. White was succeeded as leader by Franklin MP Dean Winter, with Anita Dow continuing as Deputy.

In June 2025, Leader Dean Winter moved a motion of no confidence in Liberal Premier Jeremy Rockliff. The motion was passed with support from Labor Speaker Michelle O’Byrne, the Greens, and Independents Andrew Jenner, Kristie Johnston and Craig Garland. The successful no confidence motion led to the 2025 Tasmanian state election, where the party won 10 seats and recorded its lowest primary vote in over 100 years. Dean Winter did not concede defeat following the election and is continuing to liaise with the crossbench on a possible minority government, as neither major party won enough seats to form a majority government.

Following a failed motion of no confidence in the Liberal Government following the 2025 state election, Labor declared it had lost the election, spilling its leadership positions. Josh Willie was elected leader of the Labor party, succeeding Dean Winter. Janie Finlay was also elected deputy leader, succeeding Anita Dow.

== Parliamentary leaders ==
The following people have served as parliamentary leader of the Labor Party in Tasmania:

| # | Leader | Term start | Term end | Time in office | Premier |
|---|---|---|---|---|---|
| 1 | John Earle | 30 May 1906 | 2 November 1916 | 10 years, 156 days | Yes (1909, 1914–1916) |
| 2 | Joseph Lyons | 2 November 1916 | 22 October 1919 | 2 years, 354 days | No |
| 3 | James Ogden | 22 October 1919 | 2 August 1920 | 285 days | No |
| (2) | Joseph Lyons | 2 August 1920 | 15 October 1929 | 9 years, 74 days | Yes (1923–1928) |
| 4 | Albert Ogilvie | 15 October 1929 | 10 June 1939† | 9 years, 238 days | Yes (1934–1939) |
| 5 | Edmund Dwyer-Gray | 6 July 1939 | 18 December 1939 | 165 days | Yes (1939) |
| 6 | Robert Cosgrove | 18 December 1939 | 15 December 1947 | 7 years, 362 days | Yes (1934–1947) |
| 7 | Edward Brooker | 15 December 1947 | 25 February 1948 | 72 days | Yes (1947–1948) |
| (6) | Robert Cosgrove | 25 February 1948 | 25 August 1958 | 10 years, 181 days | Yes (1948–1958) |
| 8 | Eric Reece | 25 August 1958 | March 1975 | 16 years, 206 days (approx.) | Yes (1958–1969, 1972–1975) |
| 9 | Bill Neilson | March 1975 | 9 November 1977 | 2 years, 235 days (approx.) | Yes (1975–1977) |
| 10 | Doug Lowe | 9 November 1977 | 11 November 1981 | 4 years, 2 days | Yes (1977–1981) |
| 11 | Harry Holgate | 11 November 1981 | 26 May 1982 | 196 days | Yes (1981–1982) |
| 12 | Ken Wriedt | 26 May 1982 | 19 February 1986 | 3 years, 269 days | No |
| 13 | Neil Batt | 19 February 1986 | 14 December 1988 | 2 years, 299 days | No |
| 14 | Michael Field | 14 December 1988 | 14 April 1997 | 8 years, 121 days | Yes (1989–1992) |
| 15 | Jim Bacon | 14 April 1997 | 21 March 2004 | 6 years, 342 days | Yes (1998–2004) |
| 16 | Paul Lennon | 21 March 2004 | 26 May 2008 | 4 years, 66 days | Yes (2004–2008) |
| 17 | David Bartlett | 26 May 2008 | 23 January 2011 | 2 years, 242 days | Yes (2008–2011) |
| 18 | Lara Giddings | 23 January 2011 | 31 March 2014 | 3 years, 67 days | Yes (2011–2014) |
| 19 | Bryan Green | 31 March 2014 | 17 March 2017 | 2 years, 351 days | No |
| 20 | Rebecca White | 17 March 2017 | 15 May 2021 | 4 years, 109 days | No |
| 21 | David O'Byrne | 15 June 2021 | 7 July 2021 | 22 days | No |
| (20) | Rebecca White | 7 July 2021 | 10 April 2024 | 2 years, 278 days | No |
| 22 | Dean Winter | 10 April 2024 | 20 August 2025 | 1 year, 132 days | No |
| 23 | Josh Willie | 20 August 2025 | Incumbent | 305 days | No |

== Election results ==
=== House of Assembly ===
| Election | Leader | Votes | % | Seats | +/– | Position | Status |
|---|---|---|---|---|---|---|---|
| 1903 | John Earle | 2,516 | 10.59 | 3 / 35 | ▲3 | ▲4th | Crossbench |
| 1906 | John Earle | 10,583 | 26.54 | 7 / 35 | ▲4 | ▲3rd | Crossbench |
| 1909 | John Earle | 19,067 | 38.94 | 12 / 30 | ▲5 | ▲2nd | Minority (1909) |
| 1909 | John Earle | 19,067 | 38.94 | 12 / 30 | ▲5 | ▲2nd | Opposition (1909–1912) |
| 1912 | John Earle | 33,634 | 45.52 | 14 / 30 | ▲2 | 2nd | Opposition |
| 1913 | John Earle | 31,633 | 46.00 | 14 / 30 | Steady | 2nd | Opposition (1913) |
| 1913 | John Earle | 31,633 | 46.00 | 14 / 30 | Steady | 2nd | Minority (1914–1916) |
| 1916 | John Earle | 36,118 | 48.47 | 14 / 30 | Steady | 2nd | Opposition |
| 1919 | Joseph Lyons | 28,286 | 41.44 | 13 / 30 | ▼1 | 2nd | Opposition |
| 1922 | Joseph Lyons | 24,956 | 36.74 | 12 / 30 | ▼1 | 2nd | Opposition (1922–1923) |
| 1922 | Joseph Lyons | 24,956 | 36.74 | 12 / 30 | ▼1 | 2nd | Minority (1923–1925) |
| 1925 | Joseph Lyons | 36,631 | 48.47 | 16 / 30 | ▲4 | ▲1st | Majority |
| 1928 | Joseph Lyons | 41,829 | 47.15 | 14 / 30 | ▼2 | ▼2nd | Opposition |
| 1931 | Albert Ogilvie | 38,030 | 34.92 | 10 / 30 | ▼4 | 2nd | Opposition |
| 1934 | Albert Ogilvie | 53,454 | 45.78 | 14 / 30 | ▲4 | ▲1st | Minority |
| 1937 | Albert Ogilvie | 71,263 | 58.67 | 18 / 30 | ▲4 | 1st | Majority |
| 1941 | Robert Cosgrove | 75,544 | 62.59 | 20 / 30 | ▲2 | 1st | Majority |
| 1946 | Robert Cosgrove | 65,843 | 50.97 | 16 / 30 | ▼4 | 1st | Majority |
| 1948 | Robert Cosgrove | 70,476 | 49.38 | 15 / 30 | ▼1 | 1st | Minority |
| 1950 | Robert Cosgrove | 70,976 | 48.63 | 15 / 30 | Steady | 1st | Minority |
| 1955 | Robert Cosgrove | 82,362 | 52.63 | 15 / 30 | Steady | 1st | Minority |
| 1956 | Robert Cosgrove | 80,096 | 50.27 | 15 / 30 | Steady | 1st | Minority |
| 1959 | Eric Reece | 71,535 | 44.50 | 17 / 35 | ▲2 | 1st | Minority |
| 1964 | Eric Reece | 90,631 | 51.32 | 19 / 35 | ▲2 | 1st | Majority |
| 1969 | Eric Reece | 90,278 | 47.68 | 17 / 35 | ▼2 | ▼2nd | Opposition |
| 1972 | Eric Reece | 108,910 | 54.93 | 21 / 35 | ▲4 | ▲1st | Majority |
| 1976 | Bill Neilson | 123,386 | 52.48 | 18 / 35 | ▼3 | 1st | Majority |
| 1979 | Doug Lowe | 129,973 | 54.32 | 20 / 35 | ▲2 | 1st | Majority |
| 1982 | Harry Holgate | 92,184 | 36.86 | 14 / 35 | ▼6 | ▼2nd | Opposition |
| 1986 | Ken Wriedt | 90,003 | 35.14 | 14 / 35 | Steady | 2nd | Opposition |
| 1989 | Michael Field | 94,809 | 34.71 | 13 / 35 | ▼1 | 2nd | Minority |
| 1992 | Michael Field | 82,296 | 28.85 | 11 / 35 | ▼2 | 2nd | Opposition |
| 1996 | Michael Field | 119,260 | 40.47 | 14 / 35 | ▲3 | 2nd | Opposition |
| 1998 | Jim Bacon | 131,981 | 44.79 | 14 / 25 | Steady | ▲1st | Majority |
| 2002 | Jim Bacon | 153,798 | 51.88 | 14 / 25 | Steady | 1st | Majority |
| 2006 | Paul Lennon | 152,544 | 49.27 | 14 / 25 | Steady | 1st | Majority |
| 2010 | David Bartlett | 118,168 | 36.88 | 10 / 25 | ▼4 | ▼2nd | Minority |
| 2014 | Lara Giddings | 89,130 | 27.33 | 7 / 25 | ▼3 | 2nd | Opposition |
| 2018 | Rebecca White | 109,264 | 32.63 | 10 / 25 | ▲3 | 2nd | Opposition |
| 2021 | Rebecca White | 96,264 | 28.20 | 9 / 25 | ▼1 | 2nd | Opposition |
| 2024 | Rebecca White | 101,113 | 29.00 | 10 / 35 | ▲1 | 2nd | Opposition |
| 2025 | Dean Winter | 90,563 | 25.87 | 10 / 35 | 0 | 2nd | Opposition |
