= Results of the 2018 Tasmanian state election =

Tasmanian state election, 3 March 2018 House of Assembly << 2014–2021 >>
Enrolled voters	381,183				
Votes cast	352,180		Turnout	92.39	−2.15
Informal votes	17,309		Informal	4.86	+0.11
Summary of votes by party
Party	Primary votes	%	Swing	Seats	Change
Liberal	168,303	50.26	−0.96	13	−2
Labor	109,264	32.63	+5.30	10	+3
Greens	34,491	10.30	−3.53	2	−1
Lambie	10,579	3.16	+3.16	0	0
Shooters, Fishers, Farmers	7,640	2.28	+2.28	0	0
Tasmanians 4 Tasmania	985	0.29	+0.29	0	0
Independent	3,609	1.08	−0.20	0	0
Total	334,871			25	

This is a list of House of Assembly results for the 2018 Tasmanian election.

== Results by Division ==
=== Bass ===
2018 Tasmanian state election: Bass
Party	Candidate	Votes	%	±%
Quota		10,831		
Liberal	Peter Gutwein (elected 1)	15,213	23.4	+0.1
Liberal	Michael Ferguson (elected 2)	13,640	21.0	−1.4
Liberal	Sarah Courtney (elected 4)	5,992	9.2	+4.5
Liberal	Bridget Archer	1,803	2.8	+2.8
Liberal	Simon Wood	1,567	2.4	+2.4
Labor	Michelle O'Byrne (elected 3)	10,924	16.8	+6.2
Labor	Jennifer Houston (elected 5)	2,258	3.5	+3.5
Labor	Brian Roe	1,564	2.4	+2.4
Labor	Adam Gore	1,333	2.1	+1.0
Labor	Owen Powell	1,075	1.7	+1.7
Greens	Andrea Dawkins	4,333	6.7	+5.9
Greens	Emma Anglesey	561	0.9	+0.9
Greens	Emma Williams	469	0.7	+0.7
Greens	Tom Hall	394	0.6	+0.6
Greens	James Ireland	270	0.4	+0.4
Lambie	Michelle Hoult	1,257	1.9	+1.9
Lambie	Gary Madden	675	1.0	+1.0
Lambie	Daniel Groat	548	0.8	+0.8
Lambie	Joshua Hoy	505	0.8	+0.8
Independent	Brett Lucas	597	0.9	+0.7
Total formal votes		64,978	94.9	−0.5
Informal votes		3,521	5.1	+0.5
Turnout		68,499	91.8	−1.1
Party total votes
Liberal		38,215	58.8	+1.6
Labor		17,154	26.4	+3.1
Greens		6,027	9.3	−3.4
Lambie		2,985	4.6	+4.6
Independent	Brett Lucas	597	0.9	+0.7
Liberal hold		Swing	+0.1	
Liberal hold		Swing	–1.4	
Liberal hold		Swing	+4.5	
Labor hold		Swing	+6.2	
Labor gain from Greens		Swing	+3.5	

=== Braddon ===
2018 Tasmanian state election: Braddon
Party	Candidate	Votes	%	±%
Quota		10,719		
Liberal	Jeremy Rockliff (elected 1)	16,612	25.8	+0.8
Liberal	Adam Brooks (elected 2)	10,004	15.6	−8.0
Liberal	Roger Jaensch (elected 5)	4,171	6.5	+1.8
Liberal	Joan Rylah	3,436	5.3	+1.2
Liberal	Felix Ellis	1,842	2.9	+2.9
Labor	Anita Dow (elected 3)	5,637	8.8	+8.8
Labor	Shane Broad (elected 4)	5,336	8.3	+4.2
Labor	Themba Bulle	2,757	4.3	+4.3
Labor	Danielle Kidd	2,113	3.3	+3.3
Labor	Wayne Roberts	1,709	2.7	+2.7
Lambie	Gina Timms	1,139	1.8	+1.8
Lambie	Rodney Flowers	818	1.3	+1.3
Lambie	Roz Flanagan	682	1.1	+1.1
Lambie	Tim Lovell	610	0.9	+0.9
Lambie	Colin Smith	556	0.9	+0.9
Greens	Scott Jordan	1,205	1.9	+1.9
Greens	Sally O'Wheel	352	0.5	+0.5
Greens	Julie Norbury	295	0.5	+0.5
Greens	Tom Kingston	238	0.4	+0.4
Greens	Philip Nicholas	207	0.3	−0.2
Independent	Craig Garland	1,967	3.1	+3.1
Shooters, Fishers, Farmers	Glen Saltmarsh	580	0.9	+0.9
Shooters, Fishers, Farmers	Brett Neal	459	0.7	+0.7
Shooters, Fishers, Farmers	Brenton Jones	330	0.5	+0.5
Shooters, Fishers, Farmers	Kim Swanson	242	0.4	+0.4
Independent	Brenton Best	593	0.9	+0.9
Tasmanians 4 Tasmania	Steven Honey	164	0.3	+0.3
Tasmanians 4 Tasmania	Cherie Halkett	112	0.2	+0.2
Independent	Liz Hamer	141	0.2	+0.2
Total formal votes		64,307	94.4	−0.5
Informal votes		3,791	5.6	+0.5
Turnout		68,908	92.5	−1.3
Party total votes
Liberal		36,065	56.1	−2.7
Labor		17,552	27.3	+4.1
Lambie		3,805	5.9	+5.9
Greens		2,297	3.6	−3.5
Independent	Craig Garland	1,967	3.1	+3.1
Shooters, Fishers, Farmers		1,611	2.5	+2.5
Independent	Brenton Best	593	0.9	+0.9
Tasmanians 4 Tasmania		276	0.4	+0.4
Independent	Liz Hamer	141	0.2	+0.2
Liberal hold		Swing	+0.8	
Liberal hold		Swing	–8.0	
Liberal hold		Swing	+1.8	
Labor hold		Swing	+8.8	
Labor gain from Liberal		Swing	+4.2	

=== Denison ===
2018 Tasmanian state election: Denison
Party	Candidate	Votes	%	±%
Quota		10,866		
Labor	Scott Bacon (elected 1)	11,798	18.1	−4.5
Labor	Ella Haddad (elected 5)	5,288	8.1	+8.1
Labor	Madeleine Ogilvie	4,340	6.7	+3.3
Labor	Tim Cox	3,860	5.9	+5.9
Labor	Zelinda Sherlock	1,998	3.1	+3.1
Liberal	Elise Archer (elected 2)	10,627	16.3	+5.8
Liberal	Sue Hickey (elected 4)	7,142	11.0	+11.0
Liberal	Kristy Johnson	3,234	5.0	+5.0
Liberal	Simon Behrakis	2,317	3.6	+3.6
Liberal	Dean Young	1,260	1.9	+1.9
Greens	Cassy O'Connor (elected 3)	8,095	12.4	−2.7
Greens	Helen Burnet	1,532	2.4	+2.4
Greens	Mel Fitzpatrick	733	1.1	+1.1
Greens	Rose Kokkoris	603	0.9	+0.9
Greens	Aaron Benham	465	0.7	+0.7
Shooters, Fishers, Farmers	Lorraine Bennett	1,190	1.8	+1.8
Tasmanians 4 Tasmania	Rob Newitt	362	0.6	+0.6
Tasmanians 4 Tasmania	Alan Barnett	347	0.5	+0.5
Total formal votes		65,191	95.8	+0.6
Informal votes		2,835	4.2	−0.6
Turnout		68,026	91.4	−1.3
Party total votes
Labor		27,284	41.9	+8.1
Liberal		24,580	37.7	−0.6
Greens		11,428	17.5	−3.7
Shooters, Fishers, Farmers		1,190	1.8	+1.8
Tasmanians 4 Tasmania		709	1.1	+1.1
Labor hold		Swing	–4.5	
Labor hold		Swing	+8.1	
Liberal hold		Swing	+5.8	
Liberal hold		Swing	+11.0	
Greens hold		Swing	–2.7	

=== Franklin ===
2018 Tasmanian state election: Franklin
Party	Candidate	Votes	%	±%
Quota		11,863		
Liberal	Will Hodgman (elected 1)	27,184	38.2	+3.0
Liberal	Jacquie Petrusma (elected 2)	3,467	4.9	−1.8
Liberal	Nic Street	1,907	2.7	+1.0
Liberal	Claire Chandler	1,151	1.6	+1.6
Liberal	Simon Duffy	739	1.0	+1.0
Labor	David O'Byrne (elected 3)	11,221	16.4	+1.3
Labor	Alison Standen (elected 4)	5,087	7.1	+7.1
Labor	Kevin Midson	4,107	5.8	+5.8
Labor	Heather Chong	2,136	3.0	+1.9
Labor	Kathryn Barnsley	1,913	2.7	+2.7
Greens	Rosalie Woodruff (elected 5)	7,284	10.2	+8.6
Greens	Holly Ewin	909	1.3	+1.3
Greens	Richard Atkinson	896	1.3	+0.8
Greens	Ross Lincolne	595	0.8	+0.8
Greens	Lachlan Hatfield	536	0.8	+0.8
Shooters, Fishers, Farmers	Brendon Hext	2,041	2.9	+2.9
Total formal votes		71,173	94.9	−1.1
Informal votes		2,988	4.0	+0.0
Turnout		74,161	96.0	−0.0
Party total votes
Liberal		34,448	48.4	−1.4
Labor		24,464	34.4	+5.8
Greens		10,220	14.4	−2.4
Shooters, Fishers, Farmers		2.041	2.9	+2.9
Liberal hold		Swing	+3.0	
Liberal hold		Swing	–1.8	
Labor hold		Swing	+1.3	
Labor gain from Liberal		Swing	+7.1	
Greens hold		Swing	+8.6	

=== Lyons ===
2018 Tasmanian state election: Lyons
Party	Candidate	Votes	%	±%
Quota		11,538		
Liberal	Guy Barnett (elected 2)	9,454	13.7	−1.0
Liberal	Rene Hidding (elected 4)	8,504	12.3	−4.4
Liberal	Mark Shelton (elected 3)	8,374	12.1	−0.0
Liberal	Jane Howlett	5,259	7.6	+7.6
Liberal	John Tucker	3,404	4.9	+4.9
Labor	Rebecca White (elected 1)	16,338	23.6	+10.7
Labor	Janet Lambert	1,783	2.6	+2.6
Labor	Jen Butler (elected 5)	1,616	2.3	+2.3
Labor	Darren Clark	1,401	2.0	+0.4
Labor	Kylie Wright	920	1.3	+1.3
Labor	Gerard Gaffney	752	1.1	+1.1
Greens	Fraser Brindley	1,905	2.8	+2.8
Greens	Lucy Landon-Lane	832	1.2	+1.2
Greens	Helen Hutchinson	818	1.2	+1.2
Greens	Glenn Millar	501	0.7	−0.0
Greens	Gary Whisson	463	0.7	+0.7
Lambie	Michael Kent	1,977	2.9	+2.9
Lambie	Chris Reynolds	1,044	1.5	+1.5
Lambie	Bob Vervaart	768	1.1	+1.1
Shooters, Fishers, Farmers	Shane Broadby	623	0.9	+0.9
Shooters, Fishers, Farmers	Andrew Harvey	621	0.9	+0.9
Shooters, Fishers, Farmers	Matthew Allen	596	0.9	+0.9
Shooters, Fishers, Farmers	Wayne Turale	535	0.8	+0.8
Shooters, Fishers, Farmers	Carlo Di Falco	423	0.6	+0.6
Independent	Kim Peart	158	0.2	+0.2
Independent	Tennille Murtagh	153	0.2	+0.2
Total formal votes		69,222	94.8	+0.3
Informal votes		3,791	5.5	−0.3
Turnout		73,013	92.1	−1.7
Party total votes
Liberal		34,995	50.6	−1.4
Labor		22,810	33.0	+5.3
Greens		4,519	6.5	−4.9
Lambie		3,484	5.0	+5.0
Shooters, Fishers, Farmers		2,333	3.4	+3.4
Independent	Kim Peart	158	0.2	+0.2
Independent	Tennille Murtagh	153	0.2	+0.2
Liberal hold		Swing	–1.0	
Liberal hold		Swing	–4.4	
Liberal hold		Swing	–0.0	
Labor hold		Swing	+10.7	
Labor hold		Swing	+2.3	

== See also ==
- 2018 Tasmanian state election
- Candidates of the 2018 Tasmanian state election
- Members of the Tasmanian House of Assembly, 2018–2021
