= Results of the 2021 Tasmanian state election =

This is a list of House of Assembly results for the 2021 Tasmanian state election.

== Results summary ==
The election result was in doubt for multiple days due to the presence of two independents in Clark, and it being in doubt as to whether both would be elected, or an additional Liberal and one independent would be elected. Labor leader Rebecca White conceded the election at approximately 10pm on election night. Despite it at the time being unclear as to whether his party would govern in minority or majority, Liberal Premier Peter Gutwein also claimed victory on election night. On 12 May 2021, the count in Clark completed, electing 2 Liberals in Clark, and as a result giving the party majority government.

Party	Votes	%	+/–	Seats	+/–
Liberal	166,315	48.72	▼1.54	13	Steady
Labor	96,264	28.20	▼4.43	9	▼1
Greens	42,250	12.38	▲2.08	2	Steady
Shooters, Fishers, and Farmers	10,369	3.04	▲0.76	0	Steady
Animal Justice Party	4,782	1.40	▲1.40	0	Steady
Australian Federation	154	0.05	▲0.05	0	Steady
Independents	21,216	6.22	▲5.14	1	▲1
Total	341,350	100.00	–	25	–
Valid votes	341,350	94.87			
Invalid/blank votes	18,455	5.13	▲0.21		
Total votes	359,805	100.00	–		
Registered voters/turnout	394,432	91.22	▼1.17		
Source: TEC

== Results by electoral division ==
=== Bass ===
2021 Tasmanian state election: Bass
Party	Candidate	Votes	%	±%
Quota		11,226		
Liberal	Peter Gutwein (elected 1)	32,482	48.2	+24.8
Liberal	Michael Ferguson (elected 3)	3,806	5.7	−15.3
Liberal	Sarah Courtney (elected 2)	2,227	3.3	−5.9
Liberal	Simon Wood	707	1.0	−1.4
Liberal	Greg Kieser	646	1.0	+1.0
Liberal	Lara Alexander	511	0.8	+0.8
Labor	Michelle O'Byrne (elected 4)	7,813	11.6	−5.2
Labor	Janie Finlay (elected 5)	5,830	8.7	+8.7
Labor	Adrian Hinds	1,663	2.5	+2.5
Labor	Jennifer Houston	1,512	2.2	−1.2
Labor	Owen Powell	706	1.0	−0.6
Greens	Jack Davenport	2,952	4.4	+4.4
Greens	Anne Layton-Bennett	1,091	1.6	+1.6
Greens	Tom Hall	886	1.3	+0.7
Greens	Cecily Rosol	691	1.0	+1.0
Greens	Mitchell Houghton	561	0.8	+0.8
Shooters, Fishers, Farmers	Andrew Harvey	1,649	2.4	+2.4
Animal Justice	Sue Woodbury	1,242	1.8	+1.8
Independent	Roy Ramage	377	0.6	+0.6
Total formal votes		67,352	95.0	+0.1
Informal votes		3,544	5.0	−0.1
Turnout		70,896	90.7	−1.1
Party total votes
Liberal		40,379	60.0	+1.1
Labor		17,524	26.0	−0.4
Greens		6,181	9.2	−0.1
Shooters, Fishers, Farmers		1,649	2.4	+2.4
Animal Justice		1,242	1.8	+1.8
Independent	Roy Ramage	377	0.6	+0.6
Liberal hold		Swing	+24.8	
Liberal hold		Swing	–15.3	
Liberal hold		Swing	–5.9	
Labor hold		Swing	–5.2	
Labor hold		Swing	+8.7	

=== Braddon ===
2021 Tasmanian state election: Braddon
Party	Candidate	Votes	%	±%
Quota		11,661		
Liberal	Jeremy Rockliff (elected 1)	19,186	27.4	+1.6
Liberal	Felix Ellis	6,229	8.9	+6.0
Liberal	Adam Brooks (elected 5)	6,202	8.9	−6.7
Liberal	Roger Jaensch (elected 4)	4,833	6.9	+0.4
Liberal	Lara Hendriks	1,856	2.7	+2.7
Liberal	Stacey Sheehan	1,708	2.4	+2.4
Labor	Shane Broad (elected 3)	6,034	8.6	+0.3
Labor	Anita Dow (elected 2)	5,640	8.1	−0.7
Labor	Justine Keay	4,132	5.9	+5.9
Labor	Michelle Rippon	1,454	2.1	+2.1
Labor	Amanda Diprose	1,300	1.9	+1.9
Independent	Craig Garland	4,236	6.1	+3.0
Greens	Darren Briggs	1,853	2.6	+2.6
Greens	Tammy Milne	670	1.0	+1.0
Greens	Emily Murray	584	0.8	+0.8
Greens	Phill Parsons	403	0.6	+0.6
Greens	Maureen Corbett	372	0.5	+0.5
Shooters, Fishers, Farmers	Brenton Jones	1,648	2.4	+2.4
Shooters, Fishers, Farmers	Kim Swanson	990	1.4	+1.4
Independent	Liz Hamer	337	0.5	+0.3
Independent	Matthew Morgan	294	0.4	+0.4
Total formal votes		69,961	94.6	+0.2
Informal votes		3,963	5.4	−0.2
Turnout		73,924	91.0	−1.5
Party total votes
Liberal		40,014	57.2	+1.1
Labor		18,560	26.5	−0.8
Independent	Craig Garland	4,236	6.1	+6.1
Greens		3,882	5.5	+2.0
Shooters, Fishers, Farmers		2,638	3.8	+3.8
Independent	Liz Hamer	337	0.5	+0.5
Independent	Matthew Morgan	294	0.4	+0.4
Liberal hold		Swing	+1.6	
Liberal hold		Swing	–6.7	
Liberal hold		Swing	+0.4	
Labor hold		Swing	+0.3	
Labor hold		Swing	–0.7	

=== Clark ===
2021 Tasmanian state election: Clark
Party	Candidate	Votes	%	±%
Quota		10,626		
Liberal	Elise Archer (elected 2)	9,402	14.7	−1.6
Liberal	Madeleine Ogilvie (elected 4)	3,992	6.3	+6.3
Liberal	Simon Behrakis	3,722	5.8	+2.3
Liberal	Will Coats	1,690	2.7	+2.7
Liberal	Harvey Lennon	1,488	2.3	+2.3
Labor	Ella Haddad (elected 3)	7,998	12.5	+4.4
Labor	Simon Davis	1,986	3.1	+3.1
Labor	Chris Clark	1,597	2.5	+2.5
Labor	Sam Mitchell	1,294	2.0	+2.0
Labor	Deb Carnes	1,191	1.9	+1.9
Greens	Cassy O'Connor (elected 1)	9,469	14.9	+2.4
Greens	Vica Bayley	1,372	2.2	+2.2
Greens	Bec Taylor	943	1.5	+1.5
Greens	Tim Smith	546	0.9	+0.9
Greens	Nathan Volf	442	0.7	+0.7
Independent	Kristie Johnston (elected 5)	6,994	11.0	+11.0
Independent	Sue Hickey	6,261	9.8	+9.8
Animal Justice	Tim Westcott	902	1.4	+1.4
Shooters, Fishers, Farmers	Andrew Large	588	0.9	+0.9
Shooters, Fishers, Farmers	Lorraine Bennett	310	0.5	+0.5
Independent	Mike Dutta	615	1.0	+1.0
Independent	Jax Ewin	537	0.8	+0.8
Independent	Lisa Gershwin	260	0.4	+0.4
Federation	Justin Stringer	154	0.2	+0.2
Total formal votes		63,753	95.0	−0.9
Informal votes		3,378	5.0	+0.9
Turnout		67,131	90.7	−0.7
Party total votes
Liberal		20,294	31.8	−5.9
Labor		14,066	22.1	−19.8
Greens		12,772	20.0	+2.5
Independent	Kristie Johnston	6,994	11.0	+11.0
Independent	Sue Hickey	6,261	9.8	+9.8
Animal Justice		902	1.4	+1.4
Shooters, Fishers, Farmers		898	1.4	+1.4
Independent	Mike Dutta	615	1.0	+1.0
Independent	Jax Ewin	537	0.8	+0.8
Independent	Lisa Gershwin	260	0.4	+0.4
Federation		154	0.2	+0.2
Liberal hold		Swing	–1.6	
Liberal hold		Swing	+6.3	
Labor hold		Swing	+4.4	
Greens hold		Swing	+2.4	
Independent gain from Labor		Swing	+11.0	

=== Franklin ===
2021 Tasmanian state election: Franklin
Party	Candidate	Votes	%	±%
Quota		11,544		
Liberal	Jacquie Petrusma (elected 1)	14,550	21.0	+16.1
Liberal	Nic Street (elected 5)	5,783	8.3	+5.7
Liberal	Bec Enders	3,271	4.7	+4.7
Liberal	Dean Young	3,196	4.6	+4.6
Liberal	James Walker	2,468	3.6	+3.6
Labor	Dean Winter (elected 3)	7,859	11.3	+11.3
Labor	David O'Byrne (elected 4)	7,538	10.9	−4.9
Labor	Alison Standen	3,107	4.5	−2.7
Labor	Amy Brumby	2,020	2.9	+2.9
Labor	Toby Thorpe	1,753	2.5	+2.5
Labor	Fabiano Cangelosi	724	1.0	+1.0
Greens	Rosalie Woodruff (elected 2)	10,161	14.7	+4.4
Greens	Bridget Verrier	939	1.4	+1.4
Greens	Phoenix Harrison	745	1.1	+1.1
Greens	Kit Darko	671	1.0	+1.0
Greens	Gideon Cordover	606	0.9	+0.9
Shooters, Fishers, Farmers	Shane Broadby	788	1.1	+1.1
Shooters, Fishers, Farmers	Rebecca Byfield	627	0.9	+0.9
Shooters, Fishers, Farmers	Robert Cairns	594	0.9	+0.9
Animal Justice	Mark Tanner	1,227	1.8	+1.8
Independent	Francis Flannery	379	0.5	+0.5
Independent	George Spiliopoulos	252	0.4	+0.4
Total formal votes		69,258	95.8	−0.2
Informal votes		3,031	4.2	+0.2
Turnout		72,289	92.5	−1.0
Party total votes
Liberal		29,268	42.3	−6.1
Labor		23,001	33.2	−1.2
Greens		13,122	18.9	+4.6
Shooters, Fishers, Farmers		2,009	2.9	+2.9
Animal Justice		1,227	1.8	+1.8
Independent	Francis Flannery	379	0.5	+0.5
Independent	George Spiliopoulos	252	0.4	+0.4
Liberal hold		Swing	+16.1	
Liberal hold		Swing	+5.7	
Labor hold		Swing	+11.3	
Labor hold		Swing	–4.9	
Greens hold		Swing	+4.4	

=== Lyons ===
2021 Tasmanian state election: Lyons
Party	Candidate	Votes	%	±%
Quota		11,839		
Liberal	Guy Barnett (elected 2)	14,821	20.9	+7.2
Liberal	Mark Shelton (elected 3)	8,613	12.1	+0.0
Liberal	John Tucker (elected 5)	4,619	6.5	+1.6
Liberal	Stephanie Cameron	3,168	4.5	+4.5
Liberal	Justin Derksen	2,622	3.7	+3.7
Liberal	Susie Bower	2,517	3.5	+3.5
Labor	Rebecca White (elected 1)	16,338	23.0	−0.6
Labor	Jen Butler (elected 4)	2,635	3.7	+1.4
Labor	Janet Lambert	2,278	3.2	+0.6
Labor	Edwin Batt	1,141	1.6	+1.6
Labor	Gerard Gaffney	721	1.0	−0.1
Greens	Liz Johnstone	2,883	4.1	+4.1
Greens	Tim Morris	1,502	2.1	+2.1
Greens	Jill Pierce	737	1.0	+1.0
Greens	Isabel Shapcott	660	0.9	+0.9
Greens	Glenn Millar	511	0.7	0.0
Shooters, Fishers, Farmers	Carlo Di Falco	3,175	4.5	+4.5
Animal Justice	Sharon McLay	1,411	2.0	+2.0
Independent	George Lane	674	0.9	+0.9
Total formal votes		71,026	94.0	−0.3
Informal votes		4,539	6.0	+0.3
Turnout		75,565	91.1	−1.4
Party total votes
Liberal		36,360	51.2	+0.6
Labor		23,113	32.5	−0.4
Greens		6,293	8.9	+2.3
Shooters, Fishers, Farmers		3,175	4.5	+4.5
Animal Justice		1,411	2.0	+2.0
Independent	George Lane	674	0.9	+0.9
Liberal hold		Swing	+7.2	
Liberal hold		Swing	+0.0	
Liberal hold		Swing	+1.6	
Labor hold		Swing	–0.6	
Labor hold		Swing	+1.4	

== See also ==
- 2021 Tasmanian state election
- Candidates of the 2021 Tasmanian state election
- Members of the Tasmanian House of Assembly, 2021–2024
