= Candidates of the 2021 Tasmanian state election =

This article provides information on candidates who nominated at the 2021 Tasmanian state election, which was held on 1 May 2021.

== House of Assembly ==
Sitting members at the time of the election are shown in bold text.

=== Bass ===
Five seats were up for election. The Labor Party was defending two seats. The Liberal Party was defending three seats.

Labor	Liberal	Greens	Animal Justice	SFF	Ungrouped
Janie Finlay*; Adrian Hinds; **Jennifer Houston**; **Michelle O'Byrne***; Owen Powell	Lara Alexander; **Sarah Courtney***; **Michael Ferguson***; **Peter Gutwein***; Greg Kieser; Simon Wood	Jack Davenport; Tom Hall; Mitchell Houghton; Anne Layton-Bennett; Cecily Rosol	Sue Woodbury	Andrew Harvey	Roy Ramage

=== Braddon ===
Five seats were up for election. The Labor Party was defending two seats. The Liberal Party was defending three seats.

Labor	Liberal	Greens	SFF	Ungrouped
**Shane Broad***; Amanda Diprose; **Anita Dow***; Justine Keay; Michelle Rippon	Adam Brooks*; **Felix Ellis**; Lara Hendriks; **Roger Jaensch***; **Jeremy Rockliff***; Stacey Sheehan	Darren Briggs; Maureen Corbett; Tammy Milne; Emily Murray; Phill Parsons	Brenton Jones; Kim Swanson	Liz Hamer; Matthew Morgan

=== Clark ===
Five seats were up for election. The Labor Party was defending two seats, although one was occupied by independent Madeleine Ogilvie after she declined to rejoin the Labor Party after winning a countback for a Labor vacancy. Ogilvie sat as an independent but nominated as a Liberal Party candidate for the election. The Liberal Party was defending two seats, although Sue Hickey resigned from the party to sit as an independent. The Tasmanian Greens were defending one seat.

Labor	Liberal	Greens	Animal Justice	Federation	SFF
Deb Carnes; Chris Clark; Simon Davis; **Ella Haddad***; Sam Mitchell	**Elise Archer***; Simon Behrakis; Will Coats; Harvey Lennon; **Madeleine Ogilvie***	Vica Bayley; **Cassy O'Connor***; Tim Smith; Bec Taylor; Nathan Volf	Tim Westcott	Justin Stringer	Lorraine Bennett; Andrew Large
Group B	Group G	Ungrouped			
Kristie Johnston*	**Sue Hickey**	Mike Dutta; Jax Ewin; Lisa Gershwin			

Ben McGregor was initially named as a Labor Party candidate, but resigned prior to nominations closing.

=== Franklin ===
Five seats were up for election. The Labor Party was defending two seats. The Liberal Party was defending two seats. The Tasmanian Greens were defending one seat.

Labor	Liberal	Greens	Animal Justice	SFF	Ungrouped
Amy Brumby; Fabiano Cangelosi; **David O'Byrne***; **Alison Standen**; Toby Thorpe; Dean Winter*	Bec Enders; **Jacquie Petrusma***; **Nic Street***; James Walker; Dean Young	Gideon Cordover; Kit Darko; Phoenix Harrison; Bridget Verrier; **Rosalie Woodruff***	Mark Tanner	Shane Broadby; Rebecca Byfield; Robert Cairns	Francis Flannery; George Spiliopoulos

Dean Ewington was initially named as a Liberal Party candidate, but resigned prior to the call for nominations closing.

=== Lyons ===
Five seats were up for election. The Labor Party was defending two seats. The Liberal Party was defending three seats.

Labor	Liberal	Greens	Animal Justice	SFF	Ungrouped
Edwin Batt; **Jen Butler***; Gerard Gaffney; Janet Lambert; **Rebecca White***	**Guy Barnett***; Susie Bower; Stephanie Cameron; Justin Derksen; **Mark Shelton***; **John Tucker***	Liz Johnstone; Glenn Millar; Tim Morris; Jill Pierce; Isabel Shapcott	Sharon McLay	Carlo Di Falco	George Lane

== See also ==
- Members of the Tasmanian House of Assembly, 2018–2021
- Members of the Tasmanian House of Assembly, 2021–2025
