= Candidates of the 2018 Tasmanian state election =

This article provides information on candidates who stood at the 2018 Tasmanian state election, which was held on 3 March 2018.

== Retiring Members ==
=== Labor ===
- Lara Giddings (Franklin) – announced retirement 14 May 2017
- David Llewellyn (Lyons) – announced retirement 15 May 2017

=== Liberal ===
- Matthew Groom (Denison) – announced retirement 23 September 2017

== House of Assembly ==
Sitting members at the time of the election are shown in bold text. Tickets that elected at least one MHA are highlighted in the relevant colour. Successful candidates are indicated by an asterisk (*).

=== Bass ===
Five seats were up for election. The Labor Party was defending one seat. The Liberal Party was defending three seats. The Tasmanian Greens were defending one seat.

Labor candidates	Liberal candidates	Greens candidates	Lambie candidates	Ungrouped candidates
Adam Gore; Jennifer Houston*; **Michelle O'Byrne***; Owen Powell; Brian Roe	Bridget Archer; **Sarah Courtney***; **Michael Ferguson***; **Peter Gutwein***; Simon Wood	Emma Anglesey; **Andrea Dawkins**; Tom Hall; James Ireland; Emma Williams	Daniel Groat; Michelle Hoult; Joshua Hoy; Gary Madden	Brett Lucas

=== Braddon ===
Five seats were up for election. The Labor Party was defending one seat. The Liberal Party was defending four seats.

Labor candidates	Liberal candidates	Greens candidates	Lambie candidates	SFF candidates	T4T candidates	Ungrouped candidates
**Shane Broad***; Themba Bulle; Anita Dow*; Danielle Kidd; Wayne Roberts	**Adam Brooks***; Felix Ellis; **Roger Jaensch***; **Jeremy Rockliff***; **Joan Rylah**	Scott Jordan; Tom Kingston; Philip Nicholas; Julie Norbury; Sally O'Wheel	Roz Flanagan; Rodney Flowers; Tim Lovell; Colin Smith; Gina Timms	Brenton Jones; Brett Neal; Glen Saltmarsh; Kim Swanson	Cherie Halkett; Steven Honey	Brenton Best; Craig Garland; Liz Hamer

=== Denison ===
Five seats were up for election. The Labor Party was defending two seats. The Liberal Party was defending two seats. The Tasmanian Greens were defending one seat.

Labor candidates	Liberal candidates	Greens candidates	SFF candidates	T4T candidates
**Scott Bacon***; Tim Cox; Ella Haddad*; **Madeleine Ogilvie**; Zelinda Sherlock	**Elise Archer***; Simon Behrakis; Sue Hickey*; Kristy Johnson; Dean Young	Aaron Benham; Helen Burnet; Mel Fitzpatrick; Rose Kokkoris; **Cassy O'Connor***	Lorraine Bennett	Alan Barnett; Rob Newitt

=== Franklin ===
Five seats were up for election. The Labor Party was defending one seat. The Liberal Party was defending three seats. The Tasmanian Greens were defending one seat.

Labor candidates	Liberal candidates	Greens candidates	SFF candidates
Kathryn Barnsley; Heather Chong; Kevin Midson; David O'Byrne*; Alison Standen*	Claire Chandler; Simon Duffy; **Will Hodgman***; **Jacquie Petrusma***; **Nic Street**	Richard Atkinson; Holly Ewin; Lachlan Hatfield; Ross Lincolne; **Rosalie Woodruff***	Brenton Hext

=== Lyons ===
Five seats were up for election. The Labor Party was defending two seats. The Liberal Party was defending three seats.

Labor candidates	Liberal candidates	Greens candidates	Lambie candidates	SFF candidates	Ungrouped candidates
Jen Butler*; Darren Clark; Gerard Gaffney; Janet Lambert; **Rebecca White***; Kylie Wright	**Guy Barnett***; **Rene Hidding***; Jane Howlett; **Mark Shelton***; John Tucker	Fraser Brindley; Helen Hutchinson; Lucy Landon-Lane; Glenn Millar; Gary Whisson	Michael Kent; Chris Reynolds; Bob Vervaart	Matthew Allen; Shane Broadby; Carlo Di Falco; Andrew Harvey; Wayne Turale	Tennille Murtagh; Kim Peart

== See also ==
- Members of the Tasmanian House of Assembly, 2014–2018
