= Members of the Tasmanian House of Assembly, 2018–2021 =

This is a list of members of the Tasmanian House of Assembly, elected at the 2018 state election.

Name	Party	Electorate	Years in office
Hon Elise Archer	Liberal	Denison/Clark ^{3}	2010–2023
Scott Bacon ^{4}	Labor	Denison/Clark ^{3}	2010–2019
Hon Guy Barnett	Liberal	Lyons	2014–present
Dr Shane Broad	Labor	Braddon	2017–present
Hon Adam Brooks ^{1}	Liberal	Braddon	2010–2019, 2021
Jen Butler	Labor	Lyons	2018–present
Hon Sarah Courtney	Liberal	Bass	2014–2022
Anita Dow	Labor	Braddon	2018–present
Felix Ellis ^{1}	Liberal	Braddon	2020–2021, 2021–present
Hon Michael Ferguson	Liberal	Bass	2010–present
Hon Peter Gutwein	Liberal	Bass	2002–2022
Ella Haddad	Labor	Denison/Clark ^{3}	2018–present
Sue Hickey	Liberal/Independent ^{6}	Denison/Clark ^{3}	2018–2021
Hon Rene Hidding ^{2}	Liberal	Lyons	1996–2019
Hon Will Hodgman ^{5}	Liberal	Franklin	2002–2020
Jennifer Houston	Labor	Bass	2018–2021
Hon Roger Jaensch	Liberal	Braddon	2014–present
David O'Byrne	Labor	Franklin	2010–2014, 2018–present
Michelle O'Byrne	Labor	Bass	2006–2025
Cassy O'Connor	Greens	Denison/Clark ^{3}	2008–present
Madeleine Ogilvie ^{4}	Independent	Clark	2014–2018, 2019–present
Hon Jacquie Petrusma	Liberal	Franklin	2010–2022, 2024–present
Hon Jeremy Rockliff	Liberal	Braddon	2002–present
Joan Rylah ^{1}	Liberal	Braddon	2014–2018, 2019–2020
Mark Shelton	Liberal	Lyons	2010–present
Alison Standen	Labor	Franklin	2018–2021
Nic Street ^{5}	Liberal	Franklin	2016–2018, 2020–2025
John Tucker ^{2}	Liberal	Lyons	2019–2024
Rebecca White	Labor	Lyons	2010–2025
Dr Rosalie Woodruff	Greens	Franklin	2015–present

^{1} Braddon MHA Adam Brooks resigned on 12 February 2019. He was replaced in a recount held on 25 February 2019 by Joan Rylah. Rylah then resigned on 27 July 2020 and was replaced in a recount held on 17 August 2020 by Felix Ellis.
^{2} Lyons MHA Rene Hidding resigned on 25 February 2019. He was replaced in a recount held on 12 March 2019 by John Tucker.
^{3} On 28 September 2018, the division of Denison was renamed to Clark.
^{4} Clark MHA Scott Bacon resigned on 22 August 2019. He was replaced in a recount held on 10 September 2019 by Madeleine Ogilvie.
^{5} Franklin MHA and Premier of Tasmania Will Hodgman resigned on 20 January 2020. Former Franklin MHA Nic Street replaced him in a recount held on 6 February 2020.
^{6} Clark MHA and Speaker of the Assembly Sue Hickey resigned from the Liberal Party to sit as an independent on 22 March 2021, after being informed by Premier Peter Gutwein she would not re-endorsed as a Liberal candidate at the next general election.

== Distribution of seats ==
Electorate	Seats held
Bass	
Braddon	
Clark	
Franklin	
Lyons	

Labor
Liberal
Green
Independent

== See also ==
- List of past members of the Tasmanian House of Assembly
