= Members of the Tasmanian House of Assembly, 2021–2024 =

List of Tasmanian House Assembly elected in the 2021 election

This is a list of members of the Tasmanian House of Assembly, elected at the 2021 state election.

Name	Party	Electorate	Years in office
Lara Alexander ^{2}	Liberal/Independent	Bass	2022–2024
Hon Elise Archer ^{6}	Liberal	Clark	2010–2023
Hon Guy Barnett	Liberal	Lyons	2014–present
Vica Bayley ^{5}	Greens	Clark	2023–present
Simon Behrakis ^{6}	Liberal	Clark	2023–2025
Dr Shane Broad	Labor	Braddon	2017–present
Adam Brooks ^{1}	Liberal	Braddon	2010–2019, 2021
Jen Butler	Labor	Lyons	2018–present
Hon Sarah Courtney ^{2}	Liberal	Bass	2014–2022
Anita Dow	Labor	Braddon	2018–present
Felix Ellis ^{1}	Liberal	Braddon	2020–2021, 2021–present
Hon Michael Ferguson	Liberal	Bass	2010–present
Janie Finlay	Labor	Bass	2021–present
Hon Peter Gutwein ^{3}	Liberal	Bass	2002–2022
Ella Haddad	Labor	Clark	2018–present
Roger Jaensch	Liberal	Braddon	2014–present
Kristie Johnston	Independent	Clark	2021–present
David O'Byrne	Labor/Independent Labor	Franklin	2010–2014, 2018–present
Michelle O'Byrne	Labor	Bass	2006–2025
Cassy O'Connor ^{5}	Greens	Clark	2008–2023
Madeleine Ogilvie	Liberal	Clark	2014–2018, 2019–present
Hon Jacquie Petrusma ^{4}	Liberal	Franklin	2010–2022, 2024–present
Hon Jeremy Rockliff	Liberal	Braddon	2002–present
Mark Shelton	Liberal	Lyons	2010–present
Nic Street	Liberal	Franklin	2016–2018, 2020–2025
John Tucker	Liberal/Independent	Lyons	2019–2024
Rebecca White	Labor	Lyons	2010–2025
Dean Winter	Labor	Franklin	2021–present
Simon Wood ^{3}	Liberal	Bass	2022–2025
Dr Rosalie Woodruff	Greens	Franklin	2015–present
Dean Young ^{4}	Liberal	Franklin	2022–2024

^{1} Adam Brooks was declared elected as a member for Braddon on 13 May, but on 14 May Peter Gutwein announced he would not be taking his seat due to facing firearms charges interstate. He was replaced by Felix Ellis in a recount on 3 June 2021.
^{2} Bass MHA Sarah Courtney resigned on 10 February 2022. She was replaced in a recount held on 25 February 2022 by Lara Alexander.
^{3} Bass MHA Peter Gutwein resigned on 8 April 2022. He was replaced in a recount held on 26 April 2022 by Simon Wood.
^{4} Franklin MHA Jacquie Petrusma resigned on 25 July 2022. She was replaced in a recount held on 16 August 2022 by Dean Young.
^{5} Clark MHA Cassy O'Connor resigned on 13 July 2023. She was replaced in a recount held on 1 August 2023 by Vica Bayley.
^{6} Clark MHA Elise Archer resigned on 4 October 2023. She was replaced in a recount held on 26 October 2023 by Simon Behrakis.

== Distribution of seats ==
Start of term:

Electorate	Seats held
Bass	
Braddon	
Clark	
Franklin	
Lyons	

Labor
Liberal
Green
Independent

End of term:

Electorate	Seats held
Bass	
Braddon	
Clark	
Franklin	
Lyons	

== See also ==
- List of past members of the Tasmanian House of Assembly
