= 2009 Tasmanian local elections =

Local elections in Tasmania, Australia

← 2007	13–27 October 2009	2011 →

All 29 local government areas in Tasmania (208 council members)
- Registered: 362,890
- Turnout: 55.54% (▼1.89)

The 2009 Tasmanian local elections were held in October 2009 to elect the councils, mayors and deputy mayors of the 29 local government areas (LGAs) in Tasmania.

The elections for Break O'Day and Glamorgan–Spring Bay were delayed until December 2009 to allow for the councils to consider a voluntary merger, which ultimately did not occur.

== Electoral system ==
Voting was not compulsory. All voting was held via post, and the elections were conducted by the Tasmanian Electoral Commission (TEC).

Councillor elections were conducted using a slightly modified version of the Hare-Clark electoral system, which is also used for Tasmanian House of Assembly elections. Mayors and deputy mayors were elected using preferential voting, which is also used for Tasmanian Legislative Council elections. The Robson Rotation was used to rotate the order in which candidate names appear on ballot papers.

Candidates were required to have council experience to run for the positions of mayor or deputy mayor (a rule which was removed for the 2014 local elections). Half of all councillors were up for election every two years (as part of the "half-in, half-out" system), while all mayors and deputy mayors had two-year terms.

== Candidates ==
A total of 316 candidates nominated for a total of 150 councillor positions, 55 candidates nominated for 29 mayoral positions and 78 candidates nominated for 29 deputy mayoral positions. 11 mayoral positions and two deputy mayoral positions were uncontested.

The Greens continued to endorse candidates in a number of LGAs. The Labor Party and Liberal Party did not endorse any candidates.
