= 2018 Tasmanian local elections =

Local elections in Tasmania, Australia

← 2014	8–30 October 2018	2022 →
- Turnout: 58.70%

The 2018 Tasmanian local elections were held in October 2018 to elect the councils of the 29 local government areas (LGAs) in Tasmania, Australia. Councils also held mayoral and deputy mayoral elections.

This was the last time voting in Tasmanian local elections was voluntary, with compulsory voting introduced in 2022. Polls opened on 8 October and closed on Tuesday, 30 October.

== Electoral system ==
Councillor elections are conducted using a slightly modified version of the Hare-Clark electoral system, which is also used for Tasmanian House of Assembly elections. Mayors and deputy mayors are elected using preferential voting, which is used for Tasmanian Legislative Council elections.

The Robson Rotation is used to rotate the order in which candidate names appear on ballot papers. All voting in Tasmanian local elections is conducted by post.

== Elections timeline ==
- 10 September – Candidate nominations open
- 24 September – Candidate nominations close
- 8 October – Voting opens
- 30 October – Voting closes

== Party changes before elections ==
A number of councillors joined or left parties before the 2018 elections.

Council	Councillor	Former party	New party	Date
Hobart	Anna Reynolds	Greens	Independent	2 June 2018
Hobart	Marti Zucco	Independent	Your Hobart	21 August 2018

== Campaign ==
Jax Fox, an endorsed Greens candidate for Hobart, resigned from the party on 20 October after voting had begun. They stated that they "[do] not believe the state party is acting in accordance with its founding principle of grassroots democracy".
