= 2011 Tasmanian local elections =

Local elections in Tasmania, Australia

← 2009	11−25 October 2011	2014 →

All 29 local government areas in Tasmania (205 council members)
- Registered: 366,906
- Turnout: 54.28% (▼1.26)

The 2011 Tasmanian local elections were held in October 2011 to elect the councils, mayors and deputy mayors of the 29 local government areas (LGAs) in Tasmania, Australia.

These were the final local elections held on a biennial basis − with the next elections held in 2014 (having initially been scheduled for 2013) and elections since being held on a quadrennial basis − following legislation passed by the state parliament.

== Electoral system ==
Voting was not compulsory. All voting was held via post, and the elections were conducted by the Tasmanian Electoral Commission (TEC).

Councillor elections were conducted using a slightly modified version of the Hare-Clark electoral system, which is also used for Tasmanian House of Assembly elections. Mayors and deputy mayors were elected using preferential voting, which is also used for Tasmanian Legislative Council elections. The Robson Rotation was used to rotate the order in which candidate names appear on ballot papers.

Candidates were required to have council experience to run for the positions of mayor or deputy mayor (a rule which was removed for the 2014 local elections). Half of all councillors were up for election every two years (as part of the "half-in, half-out" system), while all mayors and deputy mayors had two-year terms.

== Candidates ==
A total of 283 candidates nominated for 147 councillor positions, 62 candidates nominated for 29 mayoral positions, and 76 candidates nominated for 29 deputy mayoral positions. Nine mayoral positions and seven deputy mayoral positions were uncontested.

The Greens endorsed 15 candidates across seven LGAs. The Labor Party announced in August 2011 that it would endorse candidates at local elections for the first time. Sharon Carnes was Labor's candidate in Glenorchy and Simon Monk ran in Hobart. Monk was unsuccessful and received less than 5% of the vote, but Carnes was elected.

== Results ==
Michael Grimshaw was elected unopposed as the deputy mayor of Flinders. However, mayors and deputy mayors are only eligible to hold those positions if also elected as a councillor, which Grimshaw was not, and he was unable to serve in the role. The position of deputy mayor was subsequently filled after a vote of sitting councillors, as opposed to mayoral vacancies which have to be filled through a by-election.
