= 2014 Tasmanian local elections =

Local elections in Tasmania, Australia

← 2011	14–28 October 2014	2018 →
- Turnout: <55%

The 2014 Tasmanian local elections were held in October 2014 to elect the councils, mayors and deputy mayors of the 29 local government areas (LGAs) in Tasmania, Australia. Councils also held mayoral and deputy mayoral elections.

Beginning in 2014, local elections moved to four-year "all-in, all-out" terms, while mayors and deputy mayors were now elected to four-year terms, rather than two-year terms.

== Electoral system ==
Councillor elections are conducted using a slightly modified version of the Hare-Clark electoral system, which is also used for Tasmanian House of Assembly elections. Mayors and deputy mayors are elected using preferential voting, which is used for Tasmanian Legislative Council elections.

The Robson Rotation is used to rotate the order in which candidate names appear on ballot papers. All voting in Tasmanian local elections is conducted by post.

== Elections timeline ==
- 13 September – Candidate nominations open
- 29 September – Candidate nominations close
- 14 October – Voting opens
- 28 October – Voting closes

== Party changes before elections ==
A number of councillors joined or left parties before the 2014 elections.

Council	Councillor	Former party	New party	Date
Waratah-Wynyard	Kevin Deakin	Independent	Palmer United	7 July 2013
Hobart	Marti Zucco	Independent	Palmer United	7 July 2013
Hobart	Marti Zucco	Palmer United	Independent	4 December 2013
