= 2021 Tasmanian state election =

State election in Australia

- 1 May 2021

All 25 seats in the House of Assembly 13 seats needed for a majority
- Opinion polls
- Registered: 394,432
- Turnout: 91.22% (▼1.17pp)
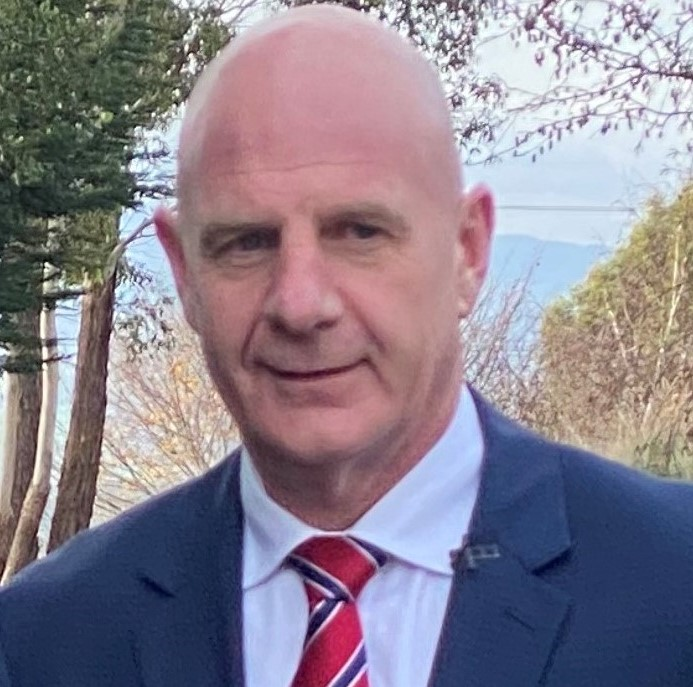

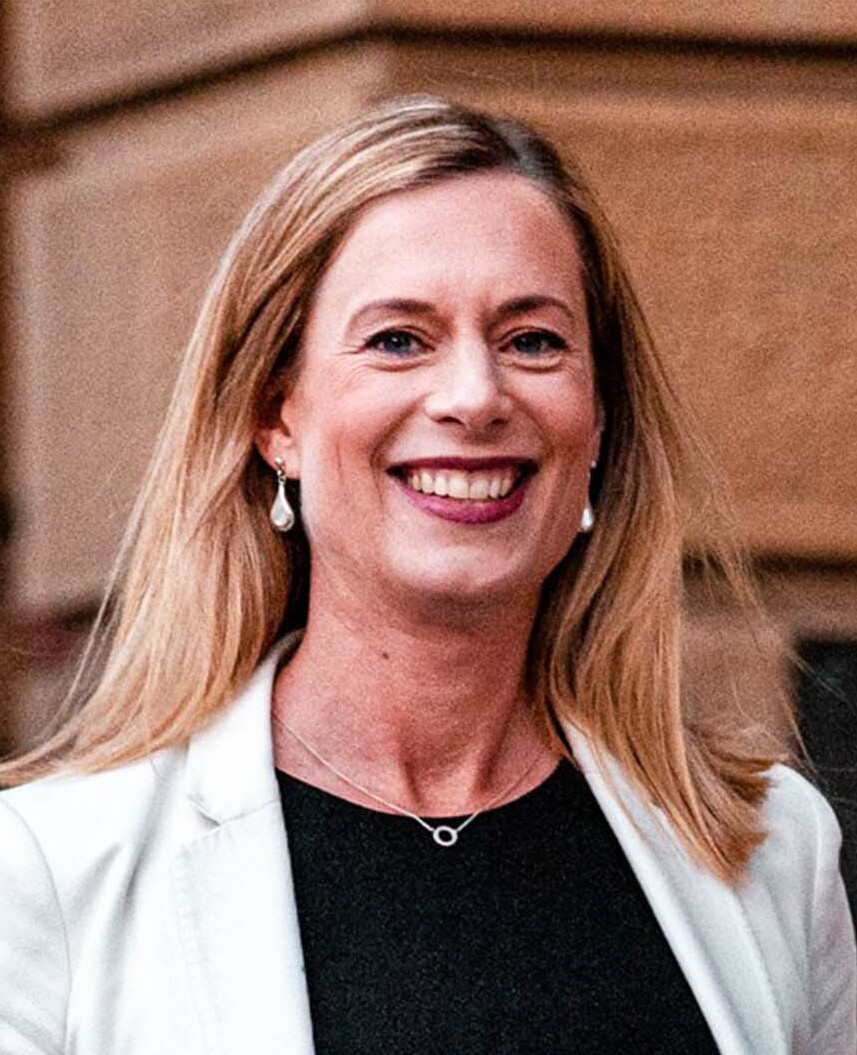

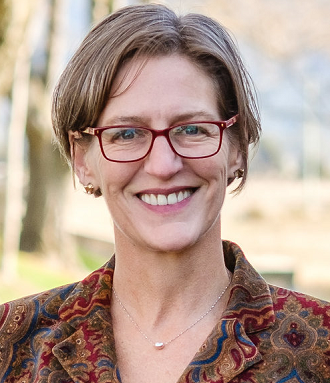
	First party	Second party	Third party
Leader	Peter Gutwein	Rebecca White	Cassy O'Connor
Party	Liberal	Labor	Greens
Leader since	20 January 2020	17 March 2017	12 June 2015
Leader's seat	Bass	Lyons	Clark
Last election	13 seats; 50.26%	10 seats; 32.63%	2 seats; 10.3%
Seats before	12 (Note: Following the defection of Sue Hickey, who became an independent.)	9	2
Seats won	13	9	2
Seat change	▲1	Steady	Steady
Popular vote	166,315	96,264	42,250
Percentage	48.72%	28.20%	12.38%
Swing	▼1.54pp	▼4.43pp	▲2.08pp
- Results of the election
Premier before election
Peter Gutwein
Liberal
Elected Premier
Peter Gutwein
Liberal

The 2021 Tasmanian state election was held on 1 May 2021 to elect all 25 members to the Tasmanian House of Assembly.

The incumbent Liberal government, led by Premier of Tasmania Peter Gutwein, won a third term in government, winning 13 out of 25 seats. The Labor Party, led by the Opposition Leader Rebecca White was defeated, losing one seat won at the previous election in Clark to Glenorchy mayor Kristie Johnston, who ran as an independent, winning 11%. The Greens, led by Cassy O'Connor, made minor gains in their vote and held their 2 parliamentary seats.

The House of Assembly uses the proportional Hare-Clark system to elect 25 members, with five members each elected in the five constituencies. Upper house elections in the 15-seat single-member district Legislative Council use full-preference instant-runoff voting. Election dates for the Council are staggered and conducted separately from lower house state elections, but this election coincided with the periodic elections for three Council seats. The election was conducted by the Tasmanian Electoral Commission.

Ultimately, the Liberals were able to hold on to a one-seat majority of 13 seats. It was the first time that a non-Labor party in Tasmania had won a third consecutive term in government since adopting the Liberal banner in 1945.

== Date ==
Under section 23 of the Constitution Act 1934, the House of Assembly was to expire four years from the return of the writs for its election. The writs for the 2018 Tasmanian state election were returned on 15 March 2018. The Governor was required to writs of election between five and ten days thereafter. Nominations were required to close on a date seven to 21 days after the issuance of the writ, and polling day was to be a Saturday between 22 and 30 days after nominations close, meaning the election was required to take place by 14 May 2022. On 26 March 2021, Premier Peter Gutwein announced a snap election for 1 May 2021.

== Background ==
In the previous election in 2018, the Liberal Party led by Will Hodgman retained government, winning 13 seats compared to the Labor Party's 10 seats and the Greens with 2. Despite holding a one-seat majority, the Liberal Government's choice for Speaker was rejected by the Assembly shortly after the new parliament began sitting in May 2018. Liberal party member Sue Hickey was elected to the Speakership with the support of Labor and the Greens. Hickey revealed she would vote independently on government bills though she said she would "always support the Liberal Government" on confidence and supply. Hickey's vote proved to be critical in several parliamentary votes opposed by the Liberal Government, most notably in advancing transgender-related birth certificate reforms and blocking legislation that would have imposed mandatory sentences for serious child sexual assaults; citing "significant concerns from the legal profession" and "unintended consequences to the detriment of the victims".

This composition of seating arrangements ended in September 2019, when former Labor parliamentarian-turned-independent Madeleine Ogilvie replaced Labor MP Scott Bacon. Meanwhile on 14 January 2020, Hodgman announced his resignation as leader of the Liberal Party, Premier of Tasmania and member of parliament, citing the toll of his political career on his family. Mr Hodgman cited the two years left of the four year term as allowing continuing good government. On 20 January, Treasurer Peter Gutwein was elected unopposed as leader of the Liberal Party, and was subsequently sworn in as Tasmania's 46th Premier later that day. On 23 March 2021, only three days before Gutwein called the snap election, Hickey was told by Gutwein she would not be given the support of the Liberal Party to run for re-election as a Liberal candidate in the seat of Clark. Shortly thereafter Hickey quit the party to sit as an independent, which formally transitioned the Liberals into a minority government. Hickey also confirmed she would run for re-election as an independent candidate. On 28 March, two days after the election was called and the House of Assembly was dissolved, Ogilvie announced she had become a member of the Liberal Party and would run for re-election in Clark as a Liberal candidate.

=== Changes in parliamentary composition ===
Since the 2018 election, there were a number of changes within the Tasmanian Parliament that effected the balance of power in the chamber.

Seat	Before		Change		After		
Seat	Member	Party	Type	Date	Date	Member	Party
Braddon	Adam Brooks	Liberal	Resignation	11 February 2019	25 February 2019	Joan Rylah	Liberal
Lyons	Rene Hidding	Liberal	Resignation	25 February 2019	12 March 2019	John Tucker	Liberal
Clark	Scott Bacon	Labor	Resignation	22 August 2019	11 September 2019	Madeleine Ogilvie	Independent
Franklin	Will Hodgman	Liberal	Resignation	20 January 2020	6 February 2020	Nic Street	Liberal
Braddon	Joan Rylah	Liberal	Resignation	27 July 2020	17 August 2020	Felix Ellis	Liberal
Clark	Sue Hickey	Liberal	Defection	22 March 2021		Sue Hickey	Independent

== Candidates and political parties ==
Six political parties contested the election. They were:

- Animal Justice Party
- Australian Federation Party Tasmania
- Australian Labor Party (Tasmanian Branch)
- The Liberal Party of Australia, Tasmanian Division
- Shooters, Fishers and Farmers Party Tasmania
- Tasmanian Greens

The Jacqui Lambie Network was also a registered party for state elections in Tasmania, but did not contest this election.

== Campaign ==
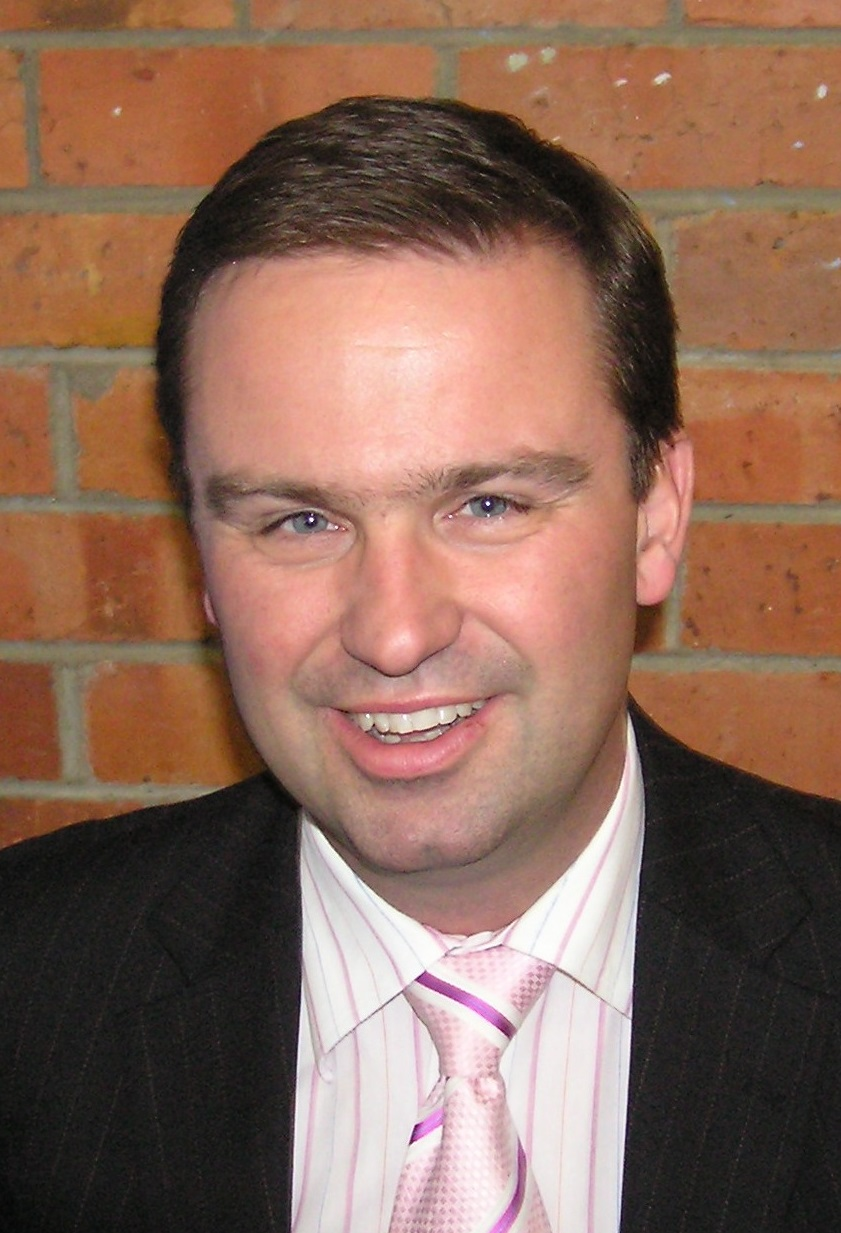
Former Labor premier David Bartlett supported the preselection of Dean Winter for Labor, who was initially denied a spot on the party's ticket.

Controversies occurred with preselections for both political parties. Factional infighting within the Labor Party resulted in Kingborough mayor Dean Winter being initially denied preselection in the seat of Franklin, with the Labor Left rumoured to be opposed to him becoming a candidate. Former Labor premier David Bartlett labelled Winter an "outstanding candidate", and that by not preselecting him, Labor was effectively conceding the election. Winter was ultimately preselected as the sixth candidate for Franklin, following intervention from the party's national executive.

It was also uncovered that one of five Liberal Party candidates for Franklin, Dean Ewington, had labelled climate activist Greta Thunberg an "autistic 15-year-old" who made "hysterical rants", and said that "this whole thing is more like a doomsday cult than a scientific debate at times" when referring to climate change. This was criticised by Autism Tasmania chief executive Donna Blanchard, who said that Ewington needs to "inform themselves more and represent us better", and that his statements demonstrated "poor judgement".

Ewington was also discovered to have attended an anti-lockdown rally in Melbourne on 20 March 2021, 8 days before his preselection for the Liberals, and saying on 20 September 2020 that "some of these silly restrictions we're living under at the moment don't make any sense and simply can't be justified". Greens MHA and epidemiologist Rosalie Woodruff called for the removal of Ewington as a Liberal candidate, calling him a "climate denier and COVID denier".

Peter Gutwein, in response, said that "We always go through a vetting process for our candidates. They have to provide detailed information as part of the process. That's something that has been undertaken as it would be in previous elections," and a Liberal Party spokesperson told ABC News that "Mr Ewington's views on COVID restrictions are well known and a matter of public record." Ewington resigned as a candidate on 31 March 2021, citing "irreconcilable differences" in regards to his views on COVID-19. Mr Ewington claimed that he had been denied his right to free speech after reiterating his claims regarding pandemic mitigation.

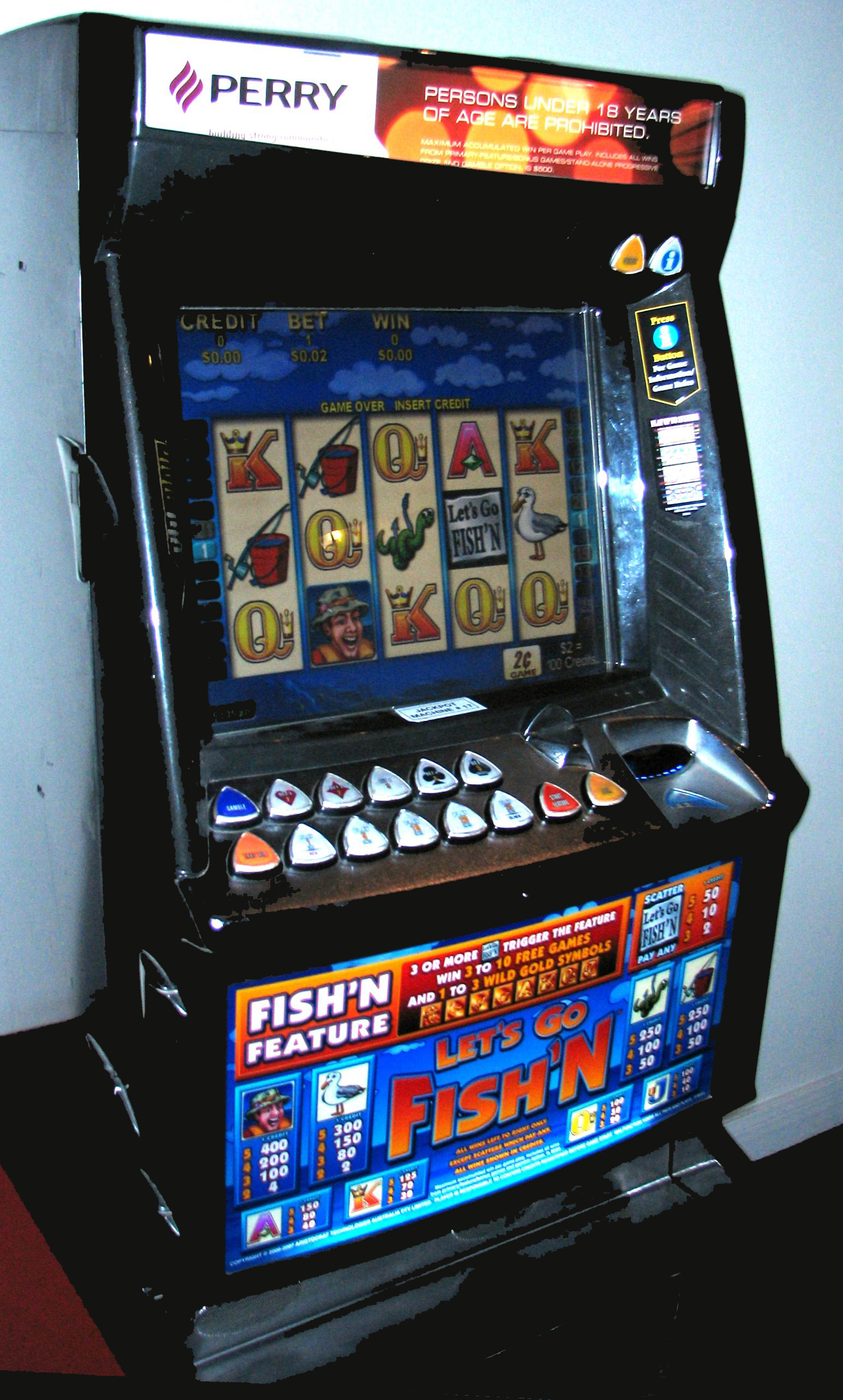
A New Zealand pokie machine.

On 31 March 2021, it was announced that Labor would be reversing the policy they had run on at the previous election in regards to pokie machines. Labor had previously pledged in 2018 to confine pokie machines to casinos, but according to a new agreement between the Labor Party and the Tasmanian Hospitality Association — which is an industry group for restaurants, pubs and clubs — Labor will support the rights of pubs and clubs to operate poker machines. At the previous election, the Tasmanian Hospitality Association donated $160,000 to the Liberal Party during the election cycle, and funded a campaign called "Love Your Local", which claimed that jobs would be lost if the Liberals were not re-elected. This decision was criticised by other politicians. Federal MP for Clark Andrew Wilkie called the decision a "spineless betrayal of the community", and Greens party leader Cassy O'Connor claimed that Rebecca White, Labor's party leader, should "be ashamed of herself". Dissent also came within the party, with Labor candidate for Franklin Fabiano Cangelosi saying that the policy was repugnant and "devised in full knowledge of the tremendous harm that will be done".

The current pokie ownership model, which gives the Sydney-based Federal Group a monopoly over poker machines in Tasmania, is set to expire in 2023. The Liberal Party has pledged to give pokie licenses to individual pubs and clubs, with the Federal Group retaining ownership in the 12 Hobart casinos and hotels they own. However, the party has not revealed the tax rate that casinos — most of which are owned by the Federal Group — are to pay for the changes. At the previous election, the Liberals promised to make the tax rate for casinos lower than the proposed 40% for pubs and clubs (the tax rate is currently 25%) but has not yet specified the exact rate. Peter Gutwein has claimed that Federal Group would lose out in the government's changes, while Peter Hoult, who is the former head of the state Liquor and Gaming Commission, told The Guardian that "there’s just no way Treasury officials have not been working on and provided tax rates [for Federal Group] to the government". Greens leader Cassy O'Connor called for the tax rates to be announced before the election, saying that "it's not his money, it belongs to the people of Tasmania".

Labor candidate for the seat of Clark Ben McGregor resigned as a candidate on 7 April 2021 over text messages he had sent. He claimed that complaints made against him had "[weaponised] the current justified public outrage at the treatment of women in this country for selfish, tawdry and political purposes", and that Labor leader Rebecca White wrote to him demanding he either resign his candidacy or be disendorsed. McGregor, who is also the state president of Tasmanian Labor, defended himself by saying that the text conversation was "full of dark humour and was within our conversations more broadly". The woman who McGregor had sent the text messages to claimed that after refusing an invitation from McGregor to go to a pub, he called her a "cunt" and sent her an image of a penis.

Liberal candidate for Braddon and former MP Adam Brooks received a court summons during the campaign due to alleged firearm offences, with police claiming that Brooks "incorrectly stored ammunition", breaching Tasmanian state law on firearms. Brooks responded by saying that he has "had a discussion with the police in relation to the storage of ammunition, there are no firearms involved", and that he will vigorously defend the allegations. Peter Gutwein said that Brooks, who is also the Tasmanian Liberal Party's treasurer, would remain a candidate for the party. Labor also raised questions on dating profiles using Brooks' face under different names, with Gutwein saying that it was concerning, but "at the end of the day [Brooks] made it very clear to me that that's not him".

On 30 April 2021, the day before the election, it was announced that the Victorian authorities were launching an investigation into a fake license alleged to belong to Brooks, with a woman also coming forward saying she had met Brooks through the dating site OkCupid, and that she had been catfished by him, who was using the identity of "Terry Brooks".

Both major parties held campaign launches on 18 April 2021. In regards to the coronavirus pandemic, Liberal leader and Premier Peter Gutwein said that his party "laid out a clear plan, which firstly kept people safe, and then secondly began the rebuilding of our economy", and that "Tasmania is now one of the safest places on the planet". Meanwhile, Labor leader Rebecca White took aim at the government's healthcare policy, saying that "after seven years of a Liberal government, the crisis in our health and hospital system has never been worse". Federal Labor leader Anthony Albanese also attended the Labor launch, endorsing Rebecca White as a "strong leader of courage".

== Debates ==
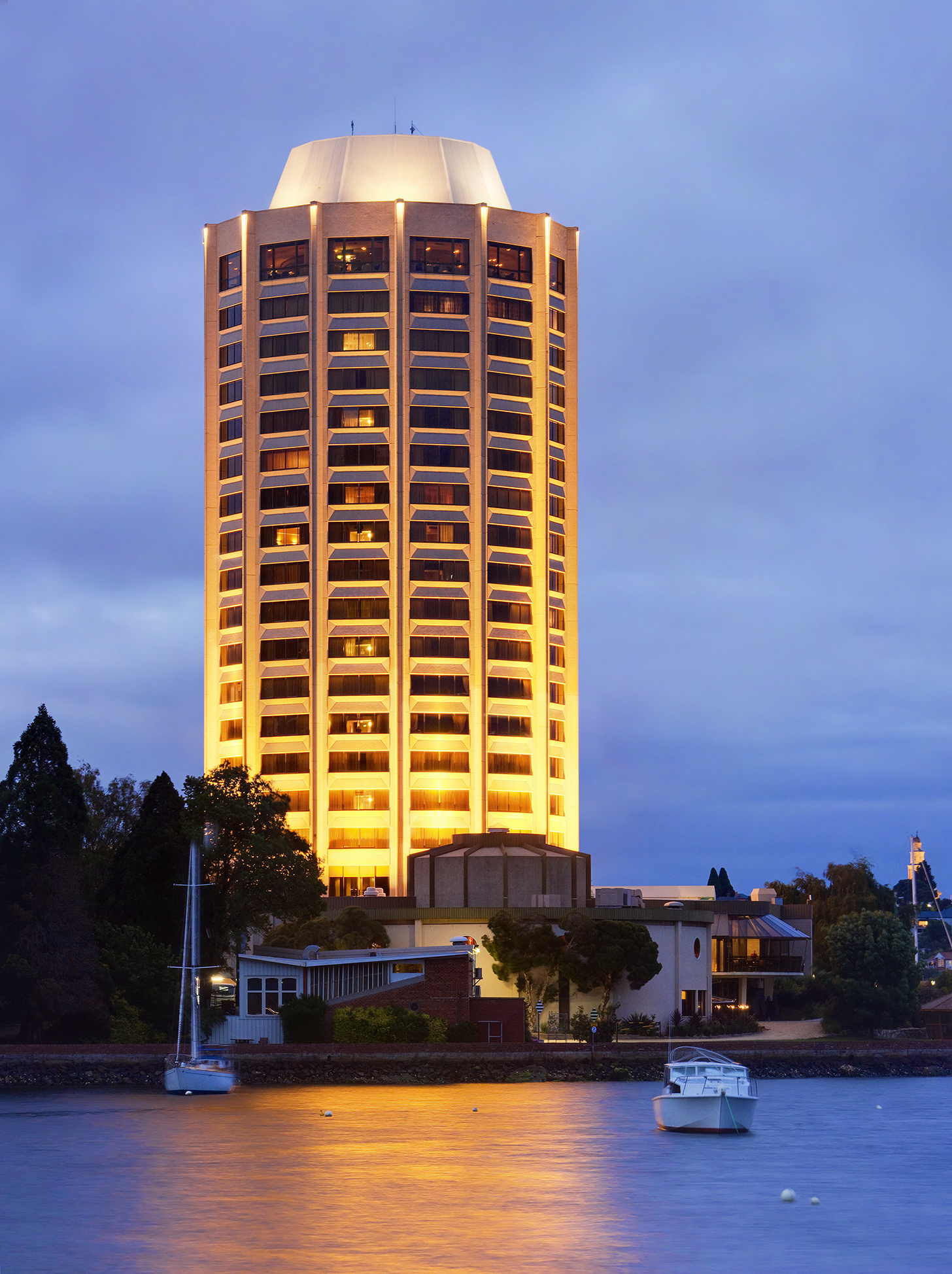
Wrest Point Casino, the site of the first leaders' debate.

Three leadership debates took place between Premier Peter Gutwein and opposition leader Rebecca White. At the first debate, located at Wrest Point Casino in Hobart, both leaders pledged only to lead a majority government. In the second debate, hosted by The Examiner, the two politicians discussed, among other issues, healthcare, local government amalgamation and labour shortages. The final leaders debate, billed as a "People's Forum", was co-hosted by Sky News Australia and The Mercury, took place on Tuesday, with issues such as healthcare, economic management and coronavirus recovery all being discussed. Among the undecided voters who had attended the debate, White was clearly favored by the voters in the room, with a straw poll showing her with a 59% approval to Premier Gutwein's 15% approval with 26% remaining undecided.

== Opinion polling ==
=== Graphical summary ===
Graphical summary of voting intention polls leading up to the 2021 Tasmanian state election. Local regression trends for each party/grouping are shown as solid lines.

=== Voting intention ===
Polling was regularly conducted for Tasmanian state politics by Enterprise Marketing and Research Services (EMRS). The sample size for each EMRS poll is 1,000 Tasmanian voters.

House of Assembly (lower house) polling
	Firm	Political parties
	Firm	LIB	ALP	GRN	IND/OTH
April 2021	uComms	41%	32%	12.4%	14.6%
February 2021	EMRS	52%	27%	14%	7%
November 2020	EMRS	52%	25%	13%	11%
August 2020	EMRS	54%	24%	12%	10%
May 2020	EMRS	52%	28%	10%	10%
March 2020	EMRS	43%	34%	12%	11%
20 January 2020 Peter Gutwein becomes leader of the Liberal Party and Premier of Tasmania
December 2019	EMRS	44%	31%	13%	12%
November 2019	EMRS	47%	29%	13%	11%
July 2019	EMRS	38%	30%	16%	16%
May 2019	EMRS	38%	34%	13%	15%
March 2019	EMRS	38%	34%	14%	14%
20 December 2018	EMRS	39%	35%	14%	12%
31 August 2018	EMRS	36%	34%	16%	14%
10 May 2018	EMRS	47%	30%	14%	8%
2018 election		50.3%	32.6%	10.3%	6.8%
27 February 2018	EMRS	46%	34%	12%	7%
Polling conducted by EMRS.

Preferred Premier polling^
	Liberal Gutwein	Labor White
February 2021	61%	26%
November 2020	61%	26%
August 2020	70%	23%
May 2020	63%	26%
March 2020	39%	41%
	Hodgman	White
December 2019	42%	43%
November 2019	40%	45%
July 2019	40%	45%
May 2019	41%	43%
March 2019	41%	44%
December 2018	40%	46%
August 2018	36%	48%
May 2018	47%	41%
2018 election
January 2018	48%	41%
Polling conducted by EMRS.^ Remainder were "uncommitted".

== Newspaper endorsements ==
Newspaper	Endorsement
The Mercury	Liberal

== Results ==
The election result was in doubt for multiple days due to the presence of two independents in Clark, and it being in doubt as to whether both would be elected, or an additional Liberal and one independent would be elected. Labor leader Rebecca White conceded the election at approximately 10pm on election night. Despite it at the time being unclear as to whether his party would govern in minority or majority, Liberal Premier Peter Gutwein also claimed victory on election night. On 12 May 2021, the count in Clark completed, electing two Liberals in Clark, and as a result giving the party a one-seat majority government.

Party	Votes	%	+/–	Seats	+/–
Liberal	166,315	48.72	▼1.54	13	Steady
Labor	96,264	28.20	▼4.43	9	▼1
Greens	42,250	12.38	▲2.08	2	Steady
Shooters, Fishers, and Farmers	10,369	3.04	▲0.76	0	Steady
Animal Justice Party	4,782	1.40	▲1.40	0	Steady
Australian Federation	154	0.05	▲0.05	0	Steady
Independents	21,216	6.22	▲5.14	1	▲1
Total	341,350	100.00	–	25	–
Valid votes	341,350	94.87			
Invalid/blank votes	18,455	5.13	▲0.21		
Total votes	359,805	100.00	–		
Registered voters/turnout	394,432	91.22	▼1.17		
Source: TEC

=== Primary vote percentages by division ===
	Bass	Braddon	Clark	Franklin	Lyons
Labor Party	26.02%	26.53%	22.06%	33.21%	32.54%
Liberal Party	59.95%	57.19%	31.83%	42.26%	51.19%
Tasmanian Greens	9.18%	5.55%	20.03%	18.95%	8.86%
Other	4.85%	10.73%	26.07%	5.58%	7.41%

=== Distribution of seats ===
Electorate	Seats held
Bass	
Braddon	
Clark	
Franklin	
Lyons	

Labor
Liberal
Green
Independent
