= Craig Garland =

Australian politician

Craig Garland MP

Member of the Tasmanian House of Assembly for Braddon
- Incumbent
- Assumed office 23 March 2024 Serving with 6 others

Personal details
- Born: 9 September 1964 (age 62) Wynyard, Tasmania, Australia
- Party: Independent
- Other political affiliations: Local (2021−2022)
- Occupation: Fisherman

Craig Anthony Garland (born 9 September 1964) is an Australian politician, fisherman and environmentalist representing the Division of Braddon in the Tasmanian House of Assembly since the 2024 Tasmanian state election.

== Political career ==
Garland first stood as a candidate in the 2018 Tasmanian state election in Braddon, receiving almost 2,000 votes. He then ran for the federal division with the same name and boundaries in the 2018 by-election. Despite being a political newcomer, his self-funded grassroots campaign attracted sufficient attention that ABC News journalist Alexandra Humphries stated that "[y]ou could be forgiven for thinking that both the Liberal and Labor parties see independent candidate Craig Garland as their main opposition".

His decision to direct preferences on his how-to-vote cards to the ALP candidate Justine Keay ahead of the Liberal Party's Brett Whitely saw his attract the ire of then federal senator for Tasmania Eric Abetz, who held a press conference to highlight that Garland had pleaded guilty to an assault charge in Victoria in 1994. Garland responded that the charge related to an incident where he had stepped in to help a group of friends who were being bashed, stating "I've got nothing to hide whatsoever. If I was faced with the same situation again and had two young blokes being chased down the road being bashed, I'd do the same thing again." He added that "They're clutching at straws. Obviously, they're worried about me... They've got a minority view, they want to rule — they're an elitist, self-entitled pack of pricks." Abetz later criticised Garland's use of offensive language in calling him a "prick".

He went on to contest the 2019 election for the federal Senate in Tasmania, polling just over 1% of the vote.

In 2021, Garland co-founded The Local Party (later named The Local Network) and contested the state seat of Braddon in the 2021 Tasmanian state election for the party. However, Garland left the party and contested the 2022 Australian federal election and 2024 Tasmanian state election as an independent.

In the 2024 state election, he received approximately 5.1% of the first preference votes in the seat of Braddon. After distribution of preferences, this rose to 11.1%, enough for him to secure the seventh seat in this electorate ahead of the fourth Liberal Party candidate. The Liberal Party finished the election with 14 seats state-wide, four short of the 18 required to form government in their own right. They secured the support of the three members of the Jacqui Lambie Network, but still required the support of at least one independent. Garland said he was looking forward to the conversation with Premier Jeremy Rockliff about potentially guaranteeing supply, saying that the Liberals were "better off having me inside the tent pissing out than outside the tent pissing in, so we'll have some discussions shortly. I'm there for the same reason Jeremy is, so if we can put past differences aside and say, 'How can I constructively be involved in making things a bit easier and a bit better?', that's my intent."

Garland was re-elected at the 2025 Tasmanian state election with an increased personal vote.

Following the 2025 state election, Garland confirmed he would not be supporting the incumbent Liberal Party in its attempt to form minority government in the resulting hung parliament. Garland’s comments were a result of the governments handling of the Marinus Link project and what he describes as a lack of transparency from the Liberals and Premier Jeremy Rockliff. Garland confirmed he would support the opposition Labor Party to form government.

== Policies ==
Garland is a fisherman and long-term campaigner against industrial salmon farming in the waters off Tasmania's north-west coast. Before his first election campaign in 2018, he had already led protests against salmon industry practices, such as the relocation of wild seals from salmon farming areas to native fishing areas over 400 kilometers away.

In the lead-up to the 2024 Tasmanian election he also ran on a platform of affordable housing and energy, while calling for a Tasmanian anti-corruption commission, similar to the IBAC in Victoria or ICAC in New South Wales.

Together with other independent candidates, he also signed The Forest Pledge in March 2024 in support of Tasmania following other states such as Victoria and Western Australia to end native forest logging, which he described as "industrial scale carnage... that has gone on for decades in Tasmania." This was qualified by support for selective logging.

Garland supports decriminalisation of cannabis and allowances for people to cultivate a small number of plants for personal use.

== Legal issues ==
In November 2024, Garland was found with cannabis in his system and his car during a roadside drug test in Smithton, Tasmania. In June 2025, he pleaded guilty in the Burnie Magistrates Court to a charge of driving with an illicit drug.

On 13 October 2025, Garland was fined $1,096, disqualified from driving for six months, and had his licence cancelled. Magistrate Leanne Topfer was "required to impose a mandatory minimum six-month suspension because Mr Garland had a prior drink driving offence from 1996."

Garland was granted a restricted licence to allow him to travel to parliamentary sittings and his accommodation outside the city, as he is unable to stay in Hobart due to the cost of accommodation and "the city's noise, traffic or soft beds."

Following the conviction, Garland issued a public statement apologising for "letting the community down and for falling short of public expectations," and subsequently sponsored a parliamentary petition calling for cannabis law reform in Tasmania.
