= Jax Fox =

Australian politician

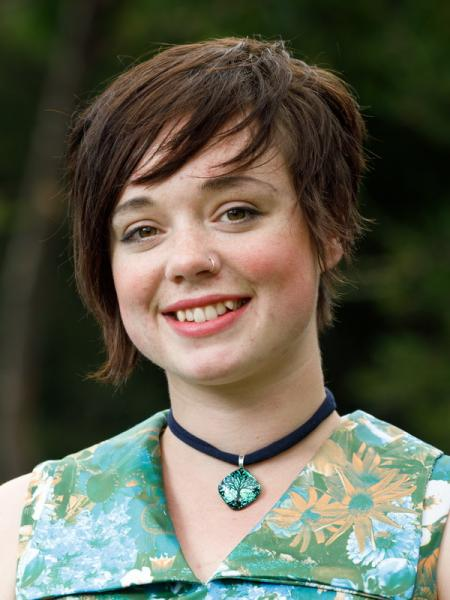
- Fox in 2018

Councillor on Hobart City Council
- In office 30 October 2018 – 25 October 2022
- Succeeded by: Ben Lohberger

Personal details
- Born: Holly A. Ewin; 1991 or 1992 (age 34–35)
- Party: Independent (since 2018)
- Other political affiliations: Tasmanian Greens (until 2018)
- Spouse: (m. 2001/02; div. 2004/05)
- Education: University of Tasmania

Jax P. Fox is an Australian politician and businessperson who served as a councillor on Hobart City Council from 2018 to 2022. Fox was the first elected political officeholder in Tasmania to be openly non-binary.

== Early life ==
Fox was born Holly A. Ewin to very conservative Christian parents. They were homeschooled and the family generally didn't live in one place for more than a few months at a time for most of Fox's childhood and teenage years.

At 18 Fox entered an abusive marriage as a way to escape home, later divorcing at age 21.

Fox attended the University of Tasmania, completing a degree in social and political science and philosophy.

== Political career ==
=== Local politics ===
==== First term ====
Fox was the Greens candidate for Hobart City Council in the 2018 election but quit the party just days before the election, claiming the state party was no longer "acting in accordance with its founding principle of grassroots democracy". During the campaign Fox called comments made by Tasmanian Greens leader Cassy O'Connor about council candidate Yongbei Tang, who has links to the Australian Council for the Promotion of Peaceful Reunification of China (ACPPRC), racist. The ACPPRC, alongside another organisation that Tang had been previously associated with, are considered by ASIO to be a part of the "global propaganda arm of the Chinese government". Fox said that O'Connor was "somebody I admire and respect greatly [but] still capable of stuffing up".

Fox was Hobart's first ever councillor, following a successful motion they put forward at their first council meeting to allow members of the Hobart City Council to choose to go by either councillor or aldermen rather than being confined to the latter.

In March 2019, Fox introduced a motion that the City of Hobart Parks and Recreation Committee provide free menstrual hygiene products in council run bathrooms.

In July 2019, Fox introduced a motion in support of pill testing at festivals and events to the Hobart City Council Community, Culture and Events committee which was passed unanimously. The motion however did not allow for the council to conduct pill testing as the council would require permission of the Tasmanian state government to do so, however the council intended begin lobbying the state government at a later date to grant that permission. The lobbying would following a review and not occur until after the then soon to be released New South Wales inquest into drug-related deaths at music festivals so that its findings could be incorporated.

==== Run for second term ====
Fox ran for reelection in the 2022 Hobart City Council election and came in 12th place on first preference votes, however the 13th candidate surpassed them to take the 12th council seat on the distribution of preferences and Fox placed 13th in the final result.

=== State politics ===
Fox ran as the third Tasmanian Greens candidate in Franklin in the 2018 Tasmanian state election. They placed second on first preference votes among the five Greens candidates however only the lead candidate Rosalie Woodruff was elected.

In the 2021 Tasmanian state election, Fox ran as an ungrouped independent candidate in Clark. They came in 9th place out of 11 among groups and individual ungrouped candidates and received 0.8% of first-preference votes or 0.5 quotas.

== Personal life ==
Fox is non-binary, coming out publicly and changing their name part way through their term on Hobart City Council. At the time of Fox's election, they were only going by Jax Fox with very close friends.

In 2019 Fox was homeless, resorting to living in a boat docked at Derwent Sailing Squadron during 2019 after their lease expired and they were unable to find a new rental in the face of Hobart's housing crisis.

== Awards ==
In 2020, Fox won the Young Professional of the Year category at that year's Out For Australia 30 Under 30 Awards.
