= Joan Rylah =

Australian financial adviser, businesswoman and politician

Member of the Tasmanian House of Assembly for Braddon
- In office 26 February 2019 – 27 July 2020
- Preceded by: Adam Brooks
- Succeeded by: Felix Ellis
- In office 15 March 2014 – 3 March 2018

Personal details
- Born: 22 July 1955 (age 70) Smithton, Tasmania
- Party: Liberal Party
- Occupation: Financial advisor

Joan Flora Rylah (born 20 July 1955) is an Australian financial adviser, businesswoman and politician from Burnie, Tasmania. She was elected to the Tasmanian House of Assembly for the Liberal Party in the Division of Braddon at the 2014 state election. She was defeated at the 2018 state election, but returned to her seat following a recount following the resignation of fellow Liberal Party MP Adam Brooks in February 2019. She resigned on 27 July 2020, saying it was the right time for her to depart at the time of her choosing, and to give her presumptive successor, Felix Ellis, the chance to "establish his credentials".

Rylah has worked both as a teacher, and in the finance industry. She holds a number of company directorships. She is the founder of "Unlock Tasmania", a pro-development group in north-west Tasmania. Rylah and her husband also manage a beef farm.
