= Vica Bayley =

Australian politician (born 1971)

Vica Bayley MP
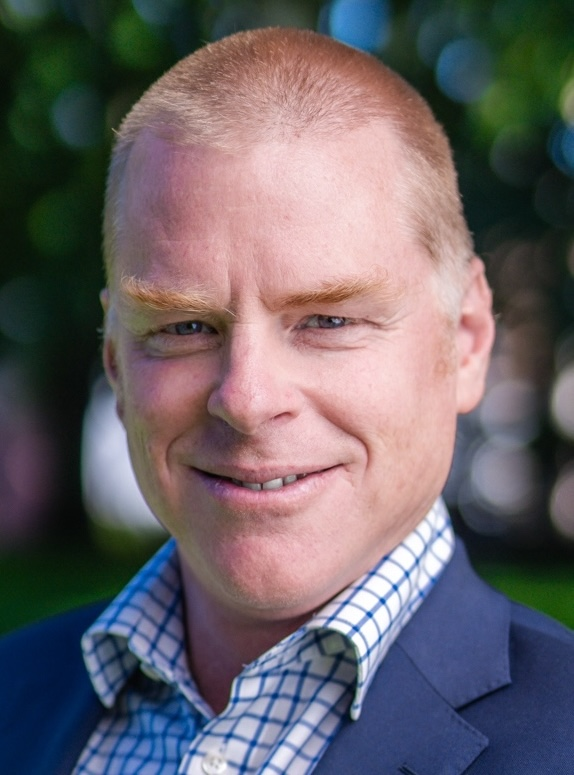

Deputy Leader of the Tasmanian Greens
- Incumbent
- Assumed office 8 April 2024
- Leader: Rosalie Woodruff

Member of the Tasmanian House of Assembly for Clark
- Incumbent
- Assumed office 1 August 2023 Serving with 6 others
- Preceded by: Cassy O'Connor

Personal details
- Born: Michael Oliver Bayley; 16 June 1971 (age 54) Hobart, Tasmania, Australia
- Party: Greens
- Website: https://tasgreensmps.org

Michael Oliver (Vica) Bayley (born 16 June 1971) is an Australian politician. He is a Greens member of the Tasmanian House of Assembly, representing the electorate of Clark. since 2023 when he was elected in a countback of votes to replace Cassy O'Connor. Since 2024, Bayley has served as Deputy Greens Leader.

== Early life and career ==
Bayley grew up on a sheep farming property in Sorell, Tasmania. He trained as a property valuer and schoolteacher, but later became involved in environmental activism and worked for The Wilderness Society. He was also spokesman for Residents Opposed to the Cable Car, a group opposed to the proposed Mount Wellington cable car.

== Political career ==
In 2019, Bayley stood for the Tasmanian Legislative Council seat of Nelson as an independent. He polled 16 percent on first preferences, the second-highest count, but failed to make the final two-candidate count.

Bayley joined the Greens in 2020 during the Black Summer bushfires.

In 2023, he was elected as the Member of the Tasmanian House of Assembly for Clark, following a countback of votes to replace Cassy O'Connor. Since 2024, Bayley has served as Deputy Greens Leader.

Bayley was re-elected at the 2025 Tasmanian state election.
