= Robson rotation =

Method of printing ballots

Robson rotation is an Australian term for the practice of rotating the order of candidates' names during the printing of the ballot papers for an election, so that the advantage of being listed at the top of the paper is spread equally among all candidates. Such an advantage is particularly strong in elections in Australia, because the combination of compulsory voting and the use of the single transferable vote system ("preferential voting") leads a number of politically apathetic voters to cast a "donkey vote", ranking the candidates in the order in which they are listed on the ballot paper.

The Robson rotation, first used in the Tasmanian House of Assembly in the 1980 Denison by-election, is named after Neil Robson, then Liberal member for Bass. It was adopted in Australian Capital Territory elections in 1995.

Traditionally, ballot papers in an election are identical, with the candidates' names or their party groups (if any) in the same order. Within a group ticket, the order of their candidates' names is decided by the party or group. Formerly, in elections contested by individual candidates, alphabetical order by surname was used to decide the order of candidates' names on the ballot paper. That is now usually determined by lot, by the authority running the election, as is the order of groups on the paper.

Having all ballot papers the same can give a slight advantage to the candidate or group listed at the top, or top left (depending on the required format), because they will attract the donkey vote. Donkey voters will number the preferences on their ballots from left to right and/or top to bottom, purely in the order of the candidates' names and groups.

Such voters are a feature of voting systems which require people to express their degree of preference for every candidate or group, by numbering them in preferential order, or have their vote declared invalid. While donkey votes might only form a small percentage of votes cast, they could affect the result in a close contest. The more candidates there are on the ballot paper, the greater the donkey vote is likely to be.

To eliminate any donkey-vote advantage, the Robson rotation system requires ballot papers to be printed in batches of equal size, with each batch having the candidates' names in a different order. Consequently, there are various permutations of the position of candidates' names on the various versions of the ballot paper. Although that doesn't eliminate donkey voting, it spreads its effect more or less equally among all the candidates.

== Kromkowski rotation in Indiana ==
A similar kind of ballot rotation was introduced in St. Joseph County, Indiana, in the 1970s. The method, used for both printed ballots and lever-operated machine voting, was developed and introduced by Aloysius J. Kromkowski, the head of the election commission, and one of the most popular elected officials (St. Joseph County Clerk until term limited and St. Joseph County Treasurer until term limited). Every precinct had alphabetically shifted ballots. For example, in precinct 1, names on the ballot would be in standard alphabetical order. In precinct 2, names on the ballot would start with the second alphabetically-ordered candidate and the first ordered would be shifted to the bottom, and so on.

It was later codified into law via IC 3-11-14-11.
