= Alison Standen =

Australian politician

Member of the Tasmanian Parliament for Franklin
- In office 3 March 2018 – 1 May 2021

Personal details
- Born: 1967 or 1968 (age 57–58)
- Party: Labor Party
- Website: taslabor.com/people/alison-standen/

Alison Standen is an Australian politician. She was elected to the Tasmanian House of Assembly for the Labor Party in the Division of Franklin at the 2018 state election, and served until her defeat in 2021.

She was a health practitioner, a community leader and a public servant before entering politics, and was the Tasmanian Labor Party's first openly gay candidate. Her partner's name is Kate Grady and they have a son.

Following leaving parliament Standon became the chief executive officer of Corumbene, a Tasmanian primary care organisation.
