= Jennifer Houston =

Australian politician

Member of the Tasmanian House of Assembly for Bass
- In office 3 March 2018 – 1 May 2021

Personal details
- Born: 22 April 1971 (age 55) Launceston, Tasmania, Australia
- Party: Labor Party
- Education: University of Tasmania
- Profession: Sociologist

Jennifer Louise Houston (born 22 April 1971) is a former Australian politician of Palawa heritage. She represented Bass in the Tasmanian House of Assembly from 2018 to 2021 as a member of the Labor Party.

Houston is a descendant of Mannalargenna.
