= Dean Young (Australian politician) =

Australian politician

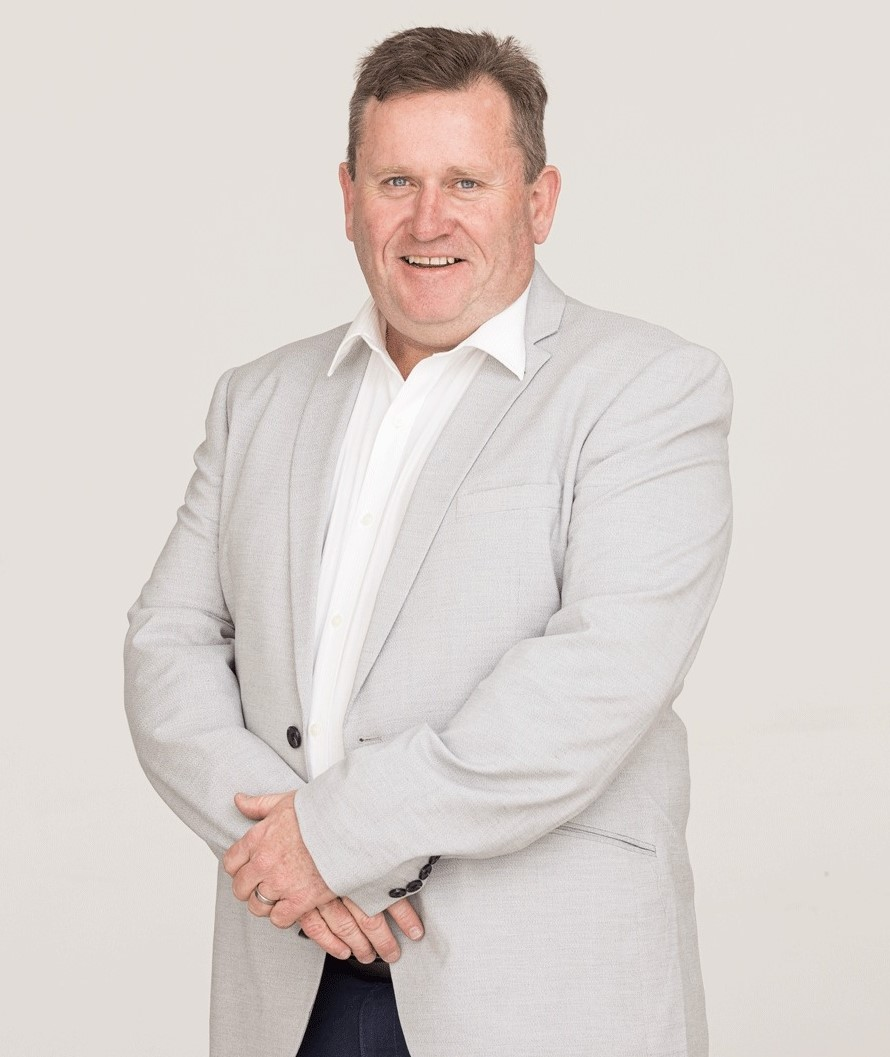

Member of the Tasmanian House of Assembly for Franklin
- In office 16 August 2022 – 23 March 2024
- Preceded by: Jacquie Petrusma

Personal details
- Born: 23 March 1973 (age 53) Hobart, Tasmania, Australia
- Party: Liberal
- Education: University of Tasmania
- Occupation: Newsagent

Dean Geoffrey Young (born 23 March 1973) is an Australian politician. He was a Liberal Party of Australia member of the Tasmanian House of Assembly, representing the electorate of Franklin from 2022 when he was elected in a countback of votes to replace Jacquie Petrusma until his defeat at the 2024 state election. He was the Government Whip and Parliamentary Secretary for Small Business and Industry in the Rockliff Government.

Young has a 20-year background in small business, including retail, accounting and hospitality. He owned the newsXpress newsagent in Glenorchy's Northgate Shopping Centre.

He is a strong supporter of the proposed Macquarie Point Stadium and Tasmanian AFL team.
