= Division of Braddon (state) =

Tasmanian state electoral division

Coordinates: 41.648°S 145.414°E

Braddon Tasmania—House of Assembly
- Interactive map of boundaries since the 2021 state election
- State: Tasmania
- Created: 1955
- MP: Shane Broad (Labor); Anita Dow (Labor); Felix Ellis (Liberal); Craig Garland (independent); Roger Jaensch (Liberal); Gavin Pearce (Liberal); Jeremy Rockliff (Liberal)
- Party: Independent (1), Labor (2), Liberal (4)
- Namesake: Sir Edward Braddon
- Electors: 81,211 (2021)
- Area: 21,369 km^{2} (8,250.6 sq mi)
- Demographic: Mixed
- Federal electorate: Braddon
- State electorate(s): Mersey; Montgomery; Murchison
Electorates around Braddon:
Bass Strait	Bass Strait	Bass Strait
Southern Ocean	Braddon	Bass; Lyons
Southern Ocean	Southern Ocean	Franklin

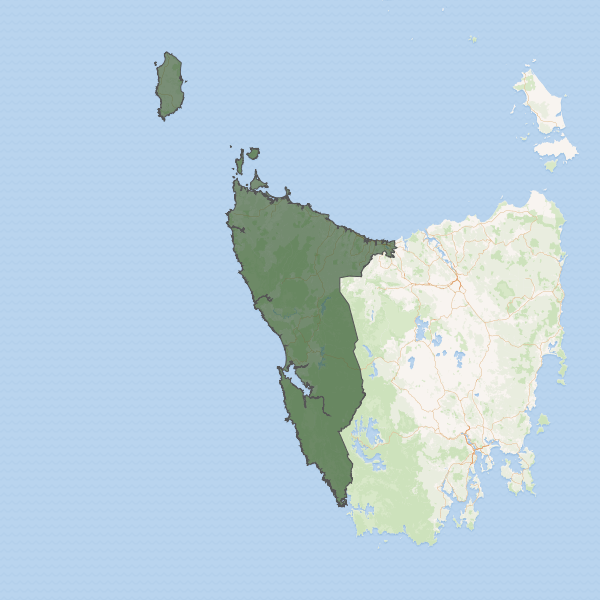
Division of Braddon before the 2021 state election

The electoral division of Braddon (named Darwin until 1955) is one of the five electorates in the Tasmanian House of Assembly, it includes north-west and western Tasmania as well as King Island. Braddon takes its name from the former Premier of Tasmania, Sir Edward Braddon. The division shares its name and boundaries with the federal division of Braddon.

Braddon and the other House of Assembly electoral divisions are each represented by seven members elected under the Hare-Clark electoral system.

== History and electoral profile ==
Prior to 1955, the electorate was known as Darwin. The electoral constituency includes; King Island, the North-west towns of Devonport, Burnie, Wynyard, Ulverstone, Penguin, and Smithton, as well as the West Coast towns of Strahan, Zeehan and Queenstown.

== Representation ==
=== Distribution of seats ===
As 6-member seat:
Election	Seats won
1909–1912	
1912–1913	
1913–1916	
1916–1919	
1919–1922	
1922–1925	
1925–1928	
1928–1931	
1931–1934	
1934–1937	
1937–1941	
1941–1946	
1946–1948	
1948–1950	
1950–1955	
1955–1956	
1956–1959	

As 7-member seat:
Election	Seats won
1959–1964	
1964–1969	
1969–1972	
1972–1976	
1976–1979	
1979–1982	
1982–1986	
1986–1989	
1989–1992	
1992–1996	
1996–1998	

As 5-member seat:
Election	Seats won
1998–2002	
2002–2006	
2006–2010	
2010–2014	
2014–2018	
2018–2021	
2021–2024	

As 7-member seat:
Election	Seats won
2024–2025	
2025–	

Legend:
Labor
Liberal
Greens
Nationalist
Liberal
Anti-Socialist
Centre
Country
Independent

=== Members for Braddon and Darwin ===
Year	Member	Party	Member	Party	Member	Party	Member	Party	Member	Party	Member	Party	Member	Party
1909	James Belton	Labor	Benjamin Watkins	Labor	James Ogden	Labor	James Long	Labor	Joshua Whitsitt	Anti-Socialist	Herbert Payne	Anti-Socialist	6 seats (1909–1959)	
1910	James Belton	Labor	Benjamin Watkins	Labor	James Ogden	Labor	James Hurst	Labor	Joshua Whitsitt	Anti-Socialist	Herbert Payne	Anti-Socialist	6 seats (1909–1959)	
1912	James Belton	Labor	Benjamin Watkins	Labor	James Ogden	Labor	George Pullen	Liberal	Joshua Whitsitt	Liberal	Herbert Payne	Liberal	6 seats (1909–1959)	
1913	James Belton	Labor	Benjamin Watkins	Labor	James Ogden	Labor	George Pullen	Liberal	Joshua Whitsitt	Liberal	Herbert Payne	Liberal	6 seats (1909–1959)	
1916	James Belton	Labor	Benjamin Watkins	Labor	James Ogden	Labor	Edward Hobbs	Liberal	Joshua Whitsitt	Liberal	Herbert Payne	Liberal	6 seats (1909–1959)	
1917	James Belton	Labor	Percy Pollard	Nationalist	James Ogden	Labor	Edward Hobbs	Nationalist	Joshua Whitsitt	Independent	Herbert Payne	Nationalist	6 seats (1909–1959)	
1919	James Belton	Labor	James Hurst	Labor	James Ogden	Labor	Edward Hobbs	Nationalist	Joshua Whitsitt	Independent	Herbert Payne	Nationalist	6 seats (1909–1959)	
1920	James Belton	Labor	James Hurst	Labor	James Ogden	Labor	Edward Hobbs	Nationalist	Joshua Whitsitt	Independent	Percy Pollard	Nationalist	6 seats (1909–1959)	
1921	James Belton	Labor	James Hurst	Labor	James Ogden	Labor	Edward Hobbs	Country	Joshua Whitsitt	Country	Percy Pollard	Nationalist	6 seats (1909–1959)	
1922	James Belton	Labor	James Hurst	Labor	James Ogden	Labor	Edward Hobbs	Country	Richard Franks	Country	Frank Marriott	Nationalist	6 seats (1909–1959)	
1922	James Belton	Labor	James Hurst	Labor	Philip Kelly	Labor	Edward Hobbs	Country	Richard Franks	Country	Frank Marriott	Nationalist	6 seats (1909–1959)	
1925	James Belton	Labor	James Hurst	Labor	Philip Kelly	Labor	Edward Hobbs	Liberal	Richard Franks	Country	Frank Marriott	Nationalist	6 seats (1909–1959)	
1925	James Belton	Labor	James Hurst	Labor	Philip Kelly	Labor	Edward Hobbs	Liberal	Henry McFie	Nationalist	Frank Marriott	Nationalist	6 seats (1909–1959)	
1926	James Belton	Labor	Henry Lane	Labor	Philip Kelly	Labor	Edward Hobbs	Liberal	Henry McFie	Nationalist	Frank Marriott	Nationalist	6 seats (1909–1959)	
1928	James Belton	Labor	Fergus Medwin	Labor	Philip Kelly	Labor	Edward Hobbs	Nationalist	Henry McFie	Nationalist	Frank Marriott	Nationalist	6 seats (1909–1959)	
1931	James Belton	Labor	Fergus Medwin	Independent	Philip Kelly	Labor	Edward Hobbs	Nationalist	Henry McFie	Nationalist	Frank Marriott	Nationalist	6 seats (1909–1959)	
1931	Thomas d'Alton	Labor	Thomas Butler	Nationalist	Philip Kelly	Labor	Edward Hobbs	Nationalist	Henry McFie	Nationalist	Frank Marriott	Nationalist	6 seats (1909–1959)	
1934	Thomas d'Alton	Labor	Joseph McGrath	Labor	Philip Kelly	Labor	Jack Chamberlain	Nationalist	Frank Edwards	Nationalist	Frank Marriott	Nationalist	6 seats (1909–1959)	
1937	Thomas d'Alton	Labor	Henry Lane	Labor	Philip Kelly	Labor	Jack Chamberlain	Nationalist	Frank Edwards	Nationalist	Frank Marriott	Nationalist	6 seats (1909–1959)	
1940	Thomas d'Alton	Labor	Henry Lane	Labor	Philip Kelly	Labor	Jack Chamberlain	Nationalist	John Wright	Nationalist	Frank Marriott	Nationalist	6 seats (1909–1959)	
1941	Thomas d'Alton	Labor	Henry Lane	Labor	Philip Kelly	Labor	Jack Chamberlain	Nationalist	Henry McFie	Nationalist	James Bugg	Labor	6 seats (1909–1959)	
1944	Michael Smith	Labor	Henry Lane	Labor	Philip Kelly	Labor	Jack Chamberlain	Nationalist	Henry McFie	Nationalist	James Bugg	Labor	6 seats (1909–1959)	
1946	Charley Aylett	Labor	Eric Reece	Labor	Carrol Bramich	Labor	Jack Chamberlain	Liberal	Henry McFie	Liberal	John Fidler	Liberal	6 seats (1909–1959)	
1948	Charley Aylett	Labor	Eric Reece	Labor	Carrol Bramich	Labor	Jack Chamberlain	Liberal	Henry McFie	Independent	John Fidler	Liberal	6 seats (1909–1959)	
1948	Charley Aylett	Labor	Eric Reece	Labor	Carrol Bramich	Labor	Jack Chamberlain	Liberal	Kevin Lyons	Liberal	John Fidler	Liberal	6 seats (1909–1959)	
1950	Charley Aylett	Labor	Eric Reece	Labor	Carrol Bramich	Labor	Jack Chamberlain	Liberal	Kevin Lyons	Liberal	John Fidler	Liberal	6 seats (1909–1959)	
1951	Charley Aylett	Labor	Eric Reece	Labor	Carrol Bramich	Labor	Jack Breheny	Liberal	Kevin Lyons	Liberal	John Fidler	Liberal	6 seats (1909–1959)	
1955	Charley Aylett	Labor	Eric Reece	Labor	Carrol Bramich	Labor	Jack Breheny	Liberal	Kevin Lyons	Liberal	John Fidler	Liberal	6 seats (1909–1959)	
1956	Charley Aylett	Labor	Eric Reece	Labor	Carrol Bramich	Liberal	Jack Breheny	Liberal	Kevin Lyons	Liberal	Sydney Ward	Labor	6 seats (1909–1959)	
1959	Lloyd Costello	Labor	Eric Reece	Labor	Carrol Bramich	Liberal	Jack Breheny	Liberal	Kevin Lyons	Liberal	Sydney Ward	Labor	Joseph Britton	Labor
1964	Lloyd Costello	Labor	Eric Reece	Labor	Geoff Chisholm	Labor	Jack Breheny	Liberal	Kevin Lyons	Liberal	Sydney Ward	Labor	Wilfred Barker	Liberal
1969	Lloyd Costello	Labor	Eric Reece	Labor	Geoff Chisholm	Labor	Jack Breheny	Liberal	Kevin Lyons	Centre	Sydney Ward	Labor	Wilfred Barker	Liberal
1972	Lloyd Costello	Labor	Eric Reece	Labor	Geoff Chisholm	Labor	Glen Davies	Labor	Ray Bonney	Liberal	Sydney Ward	Labor	Wilfred Barker	Liberal
1975	John Coughlan	Labor	Joseph Britton	Labor	Geoff Chisholm	Labor	Glen Davies	Labor	Ray Bonney	Liberal	Sydney Ward	Labor	Wilfred Barker	Liberal
1976	John Coughlan	Labor	Michael Field	Labor	Geoff Chisholm	Labor	Glen Davies	Labor	Ray Bonney	Liberal	Ron Cornish	Liberal	Roger Groom	Liberal
1979	John Coughlan	Labor	Michael Field	Labor	Michael Weldon	Labor	Glen Davies	Labor	Ray Bonney	Liberal	Ron Cornish	Liberal	Roger Groom	Liberal
1982	John Coughlan	Labor	Michael Field	Labor	Vince Smith	Liberal	Glen Davies	Labor	Ray Bonney	Liberal	Ron Cornish	Liberal	Roger Groom	Liberal
1986	Greg Peart	Labor	Michael Field	Labor	Michael Weldon	Labor	Tony Rundle	Liberal	Bill Bonde	Liberal	Ron Cornish	Liberal	Roger Groom	Liberal
1989	Di Hollister	Greens	Michael Field	Labor	Michael Weldon	Labor	Tony Rundle	Liberal	Bill Bonde	Liberal	Ron Cornish	Liberal	Roger Groom	Liberal
1992	Di Hollister	Greens	Michael Field	Labor	Carole Cains	Liberal	Tony Rundle	Liberal	Bill Bonde	Liberal	Ron Cornish	Liberal	Roger Groom	Liberal
1996	Di Hollister	Greens	Michael Field	Labor	Brenton Best	Labor	Tony Rundle	Liberal	Bill Bonde	Liberal	Ron Cornish	Liberal	Roger Groom	Liberal
1997	Di Hollister	Greens	Mike Gard	Labor	Brenton Best	Labor	Tony Rundle	Liberal	Bill Bonde	Liberal	Ron Cornish	Liberal	Carole Cains	Liberal
1998	Bryan Green	Labor	Steve Kons	Labor	Brenton Best	Labor	Tony Rundle	Liberal	Bill Bonde	Liberal	5 seats (1998–2024)			
2002	Bryan Green	Labor	Steve Kons	Labor	Brenton Best	Labor	Jeremy Rockliff	Liberal	Brett Whiteley	Liberal	5 seats (1998–2024)			
2006	Bryan Green	Labor	Steve Kons	Labor	Brenton Best	Labor	Jeremy Rockliff	Liberal	Brett Whiteley	Liberal	5 seats (1998–2024)			
2010	Bryan Green	Labor	Paul O'Halloran	Greens	Brenton Best	Labor	Jeremy Rockliff	Liberal	Adam Brooks	Liberal	5 seats (1998–2024)			
2014	Bryan Green	Labor	Joan Rylah	Liberal	Roger Jaensch	Liberal	Jeremy Rockliff	Liberal	Adam Brooks	Liberal	5 seats (1998–2024)			
2017	Shane Broad	Labor	Joan Rylah	Liberal	Roger Jaensch	Liberal	Jeremy Rockliff	Liberal	Adam Brooks	Liberal	5 seats (1998–2024)			
2018	Shane Broad	Labor	Anita Dow	Labor	Roger Jaensch	Liberal	Jeremy Rockliff	Liberal	Adam Brooks	Liberal	5 seats (1998–2024)			
2019	Shane Broad	Labor	Anita Dow	Labor	Roger Jaensch	Liberal	Jeremy Rockliff	Liberal	Joan Rylah	Liberal	5 seats (1998–2024)			
2020	Shane Broad	Labor	Anita Dow	Labor	Roger Jaensch	Liberal	Jeremy Rockliff	Liberal	Felix Ellis	Liberal	5 seats (1998–2024)			
2021	Shane Broad	Labor	Anita Dow	Labor	Roger Jaensch	Liberal	Jeremy Rockliff	Liberal	Adam Brooks	Liberal	5 seats (1998–2024)			
2021	Shane Broad	Labor	Anita Dow	Labor	Roger Jaensch	Liberal	Jeremy Rockliff	Liberal	Felix Ellis	Liberal	5 seats (1998–2024)			
2024	Shane Broad	Labor	Anita Dow	Labor	Roger Jaensch	Liberal	Jeremy Rockliff	Liberal	Felix Ellis	Liberal	Miriam Beswick	Jacqui Lambie	Craig Garland	Independent
2024	Shane Broad	Labor	Anita Dow	Labor	Roger Jaensch	Liberal	Jeremy Rockliff	Liberal	Felix Ellis	Liberal	Miriam Beswick	Independent	Craig Garland	Independent
2025	Shane Broad	Labor	Anita Dow	Labor	Roger Jaensch	Liberal	Jeremy Rockliff	Liberal	Felix Ellis	Liberal	Miriam Beswick	National	Craig Garland	Independent
2025	Shane Broad	Labor	Anita Dow	Labor	Roger Jaensch	Liberal	Jeremy Rockliff	Liberal	Felix Ellis	Liberal	Gavin Pearce	Liberal	Craig Garland	Independent

== Election results ==

2025 Tasmanian state election: Braddon
Party	Candidate	Votes	%	±%
Quota		8,836		
Liberal	Jeremy Rockliff (elected 1)	22,273	31.5	+3.9
Liberal	Gavin Pearce (elected 2)	5,175	7.3	+7.3
Liberal	Felix Ellis (elected 4)	3,129	4.4	−2.9
Liberal	Roger Jaensch (elected 6)	1,849	2.6	−1.2
Liberal	Giovanna Simpson	1,155	1.6	−1.0
Liberal	Stephen Parry	855	1.2	+1.2
Liberal	Kate Wylie	762	1.1	+1.1
Labor	Anita Dow (elected 5)	5,770	8.2	+0.0
Labor	Shane Broad (elected 7)	4,589	5.9	−0.6
Labor	Kelly 'Hooch' Hunt	1,829	2.6	+2.6
Labor	Amanda Diprose	1,578	2.2	+0.1
Labor	Cheryl Fuller	1,319	2.2	+2.2
Labor	Tara Woodhouse	958	1.4	+1.4
Labor	Adrian Luke	924	1.3	−0.1
Independent	Craig Garland (elected 3)	7,227	10.2	+5.1
Greens	Vanessa Bleyer	1,924	2.7	+2.7
Greens	Erin Morrow	773	1.1	+0.7
Greens	Scott Jordan	411	0.9	+0.9
Greens	Susanne Ward	403	0.8	+0.2
Greens	Petra Wilden	494	0.7	+0.2
Greens	Thomas Kingston	429	0.6	+0.6
Greens	Haru Fergus	392	0.5	+0.5
Shooters, Fishers, Farmers	Adrian Pickin	2,355	3.3	+3.3
Group B Independent	Adam Martin	849	1.2	+1.2
Group B Independent	James Redgrave	195	0.3	−3.7
Group B Independent	Malcolm Ryan	184	0.3	+0.3
Group B Independent	Andrea Courtney	140	0.2	+0.0
Group B Independent	Cristale Harrison	126	0.2	+0.2
Group B Independent	Claudia Baldock	92	0.1	+0.1
National	Miriam Beswick	767	1.1	−3.1
National	Andrew Roberts	357	0.5	+0.5
Independent	Joel Badcock	501	0.7	+0.7
Independent	Matthew Morgan	145	0.2	+0.2
Independent	Jennifer Hamilton	126	0.2	+0.2
Independent	Dami Wells	119	0.2	+0.2
Independent	Gatty Burnett	90	0.1	−0.1
Independent	Ernst Millet	70	0.1	+0.1
Total formal votes		70,686	93.4	+0.2
Informal votes		5,012	6.6	−0.2
Turnout		75,698	89.5	−1.4
Party total votes
Liberal		35,198	49.8	+4.2
Labor		16,763	23.7	−1.0
Independent	Craig Garland	7,277	10.2	+5.1
Greens		5,240	7.4	+0.8
Shooters, Fishers, Farmers		2,355	3.3	+0.4
Group B Independent		1,586	2.2	+2.2
National		1,124	1.6	+1.6
Independent	Joel Badcock	501	0.7	+0.7
Independent	Matthew Morgan	145	0.2	+0.2
Independent	Jennifer Hamilton	126	0.2	+0.2
Independent	Dami Wells	119	0.2	+0.2
Independent	Gatty Burnett	90	0.1	−0.1
Independent	Ernst Millet	70	0.1	+0.1
Liberal gain from Lambie Network				

== See also ==
- Tasmanian Legislative Council
