= Felix Ellis =

Australian politician

The Honourable Felix Ellis MP

Member of the Tasmanian House of Assembly for Braddon
- Incumbent
- Assumed office 3 June 2021 Serving with 6 others
- Preceded by: Adam Brooks
- In office 17 August 2020 – 1 May 2021
- Preceded by: Joan Rylah

Minister for Business, Industry and Resources
- Incumbent
- Assumed office 7 August 2025
- Premier: Jeremy Rockliff
- Preceded by: Eric Abetz

Minister for Police, Fire and Emergency Management
- Incumbent
- Assumed office 25 July 2022
- Premier: Jeremy Rockliff
- Preceded by: Jacquie Petrusma

Minister for Housing, Planning and Consumer Affairs
- In office 11 April 2024 – 7 August 2025
- Premier: Jeremy Rockliff
- Preceded by: Nic Street
- Succeeded by: Kerry Vincent (Housing and Planning)

Minister for Skills and Jobs (Skills and Training 2024-25)
- Incumbent
- Assumed office 11 April 2024
- Premier: Jeremy Rockliff
- Preceded by: Roger Jaensch

Personal details
- Born: 22 January 1990 (age 36) Brisbane, Queensland, Australia
- Citizenship: Australian/Lithuanian
- Party: Liberal Party
- Spouse: Margot Ellis
- Children: William Ellis
- Occupation: Politician
- Profession: Plumber and gas fitter

Felix Ashton Ellis (born 22 January 1990) is an Australian politician, who was elected to the Tasmanian House of Assembly on 17 August 2020 in a recount to fill a vacancy for the division of Braddon. A member of the Liberal Party, Ellis is a member of the third Rockliff ministry serving as Minister for Police, Fire and Emergency Management, Skills and Jobs and Business, Industry and Resources.

== Early life and education ==
Ellis was born in Brisbane and raised in Western Australia, including in remote Aboriginal communities. Ellis graduated from Hale School in 2007 before completing an apprenticeship in plumbing and gas fitting with the family business.

He moved to Tasmania in 2014 after his mother had moved there earlier, and worked as a plumber on Tasmania's West Coast.

== Political career ==
Ellis was an unsuccessful Liberal candidate for Braddon at the 2018 Tasmanian state election, before being elected on countback caused by the resignation of Joan Rylah in August 2020.

Following the 2018 state election, there was speculation that Ellis was considering running for federal parliament however, he was ineligible for the 2018 Braddon by-election as he maintains dual Australian and Lithuanian citizenship.

Ellis was widely praised for his maiden speech which detailed his family's journey from the ruins of Lithuania following World War II, to ultimately, settling in Tasmania.

At the 2021 election, Ellis received the second highest first preference vote of all Braddon's 21 candidates, although he was unable to hold his seat on preferences. However, Ellis was re-elected in a countback following the resignation of Adam Brooks immediately after the poll.

At the 2024 election, Ellis once again received the second highest first preference vote of all Braddon's 33 candidates, behind Premier Jeremy Rockliff. Ellis was elected second at the 2024 State Election.

Since his election, Ellis has been widely criticised by the Australian Greens and Bob Brown Foundation for his support of the mining and forestry industries in Tasmania. Ellis has been a vocal supporter of the Tasmanian Government's workplace protection legislation saying, "It is completely unacceptable for workers at Venture Minerals' Riley Mine to come to work to find they can't get on site because greenies are chained to the front gates and machinery."

Ellis caused a significant controversy in the final days of the 2021 election campaign when the global vegan community voiced criticism of him after he posted to social media a photo of himself eating a burger with the caption "Allergies: vegan food ...".

In September 2021, Ellis used a speech in parliament to criticise Tasmanian Greens Leader Cassy O'Connor after she claimed the Australian Prime Minister Scott Morrison was part of a 'death cult', referring to his membership of a Pentecostal church. Ellis said O'Connor's comments were "a sad reflection of a creeping, hateful, anti-Christian intolerance".

Ellis voted against legislation to legalise euthanasia in March 2021, stating in an opinion editorial that "If we cannot yet create a system that cares which is free from abuse, I cannot see how we can create a system that kills which is free from abuse." Ellis was one of only six MPs to vote against the legislation.

Ellis introduced legislation in March 2025 known as ''Reid’s Law'', named after a father of two who was stabbed to death in 2019. The law empowers Tasmanian police to conduct wand searches for weapons in prescribed public places without prior suspicion and increases penalties for carrying dangerous articles, while introducing new offences for adults who incite children to commit crimes. While the legislation passed with bipartisan support, Reid's Law attracted criticism for expanding police powers particularly lowering the threshold for wand searches and potentially creating a net‑widening effect that could bring more people into the criminal justice system. It attracted criticism from legal and civil society groups, including the Australian Lawyers Alliance and Tasmanian Legal Aid, who raised concerns about civil liberties, the expansion of police powers, and a perceived shift away from preventative approaches to youth justice.

Parliamentary Secretary

On 28 February 2022, Ellis was promoted to Parliamentary Secretary to the Premier, and Government Whip.

Elevation to the Ministry

Following the resignation of Jacquie Petrusma, Ellis was elevated to the Ministry on 27 July 2022. Ellis was appointed as Minister for Police, Fire and Emergency Management, Resources, and Skills, Training and Workforce Growth.

Subsequent Ministerial Career

In April 2024 after the 2024 State Election, Ellis was appointed as Minister for Housing and Planning and lost responsibility for the Resources Portfolio. When Michael Ferguson was removed from the Ministry due to a clear lack of confidence in him by the Tasmanian House of Assembly, Ellis also became Minister for Consumer Affairs in October 2025.

== Personal life ==
Ellis is married to former ABC Landline journalist Margot Kelly. They have two sons.
