= John Tucker (Tasmanian politician) =

Australian politician (born 1975)

Member of the Tasmanian House of Assembly for Lyons
- In office 12 March 2019 – 23 March 2024
- Preceded by: Rene Hidding

Personal details
- Born: 22 January 1975 (age 51) Hobart, Tasmania, Australia
- Party: National (2025–present)
- Other political affiliations: Liberal (until 2023); Independent (2023–25)
- Occupation: Farmer

John Ewart Tucker (born 22 January 1975) is an Australian politician. He was elected to the Tasmanian House of Assembly in a countback conducted on 12 March 2019 to fill a vacancy in the electorate of Lyons caused by the resignation of Rene Hidding. He was re-elected in his own right in 2021.

Before his election to state parliament, Tucker served as a councillor on Break O'Day Council.

On 12 May 2023, ABC News reported that Tucker, alongside fellow Liberal Lara Alexander, would leave the Liberal Party to sit as independents, in part due to concerns related to the proposed Macquarie Point Stadium project. This left the Liberal party in minority government and requiring 7 seats to reach a majority in the next state election. At the next election, held in March 2024, Tucker was defeated and lost his seat.

In June 2025, Tucker announced his intention to run in the 2025 Tasmanian State election as a candidate for the National Party.
