= 2018 Tasmanian state election =

State election in Australia

- 3 March 2018

All 25 seats in the House of Assembly 13 seats needed for a majority
- Opinion polls
- Turnout: 92.39% (▼1.10pp)
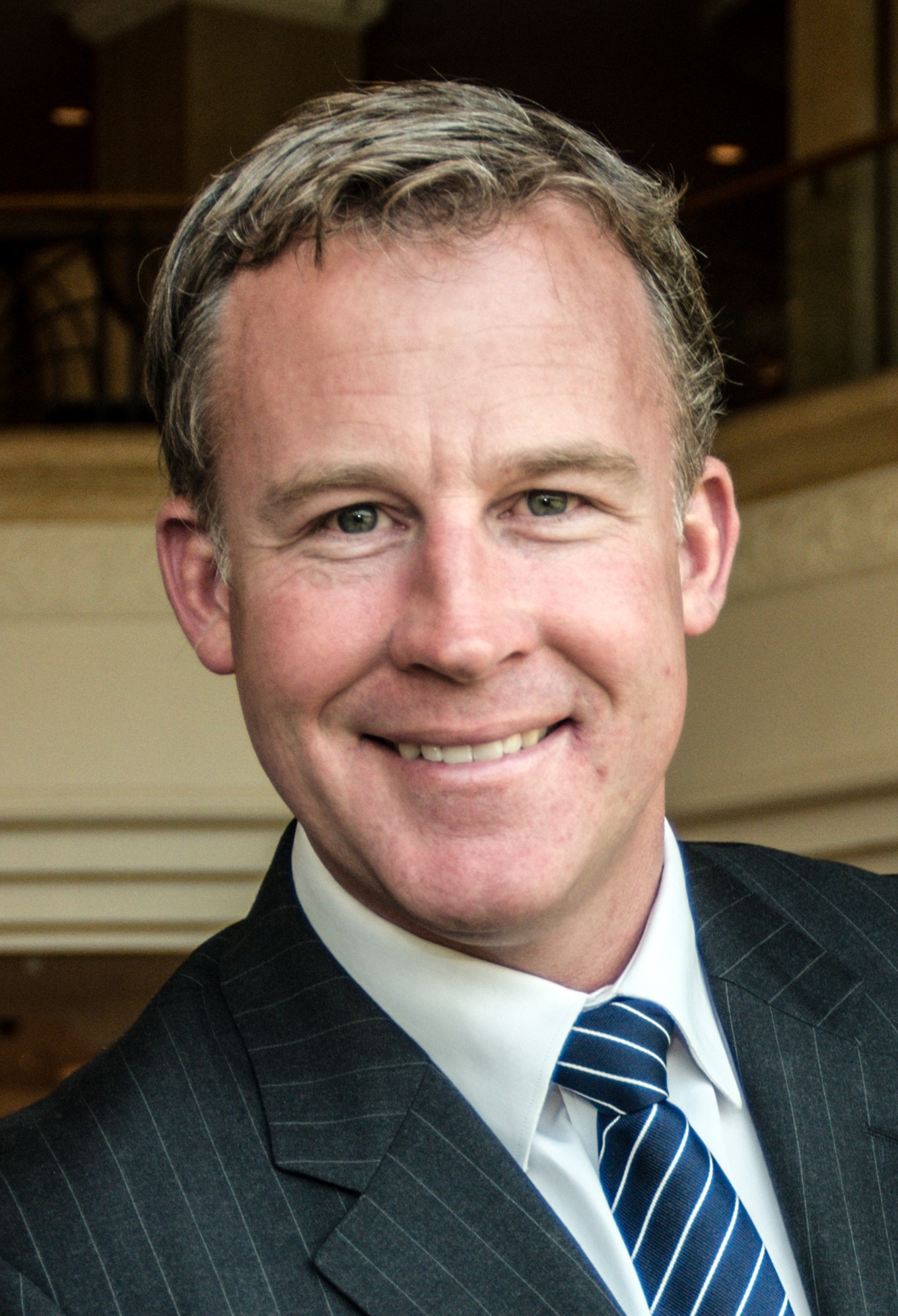

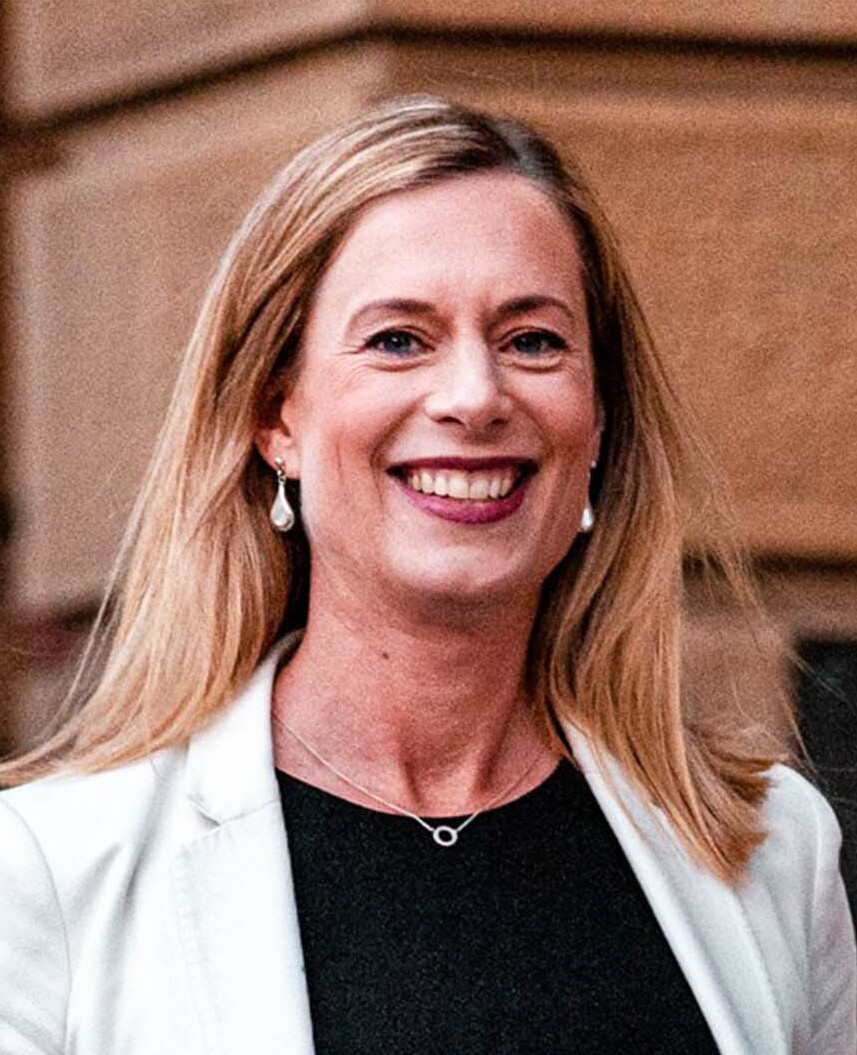

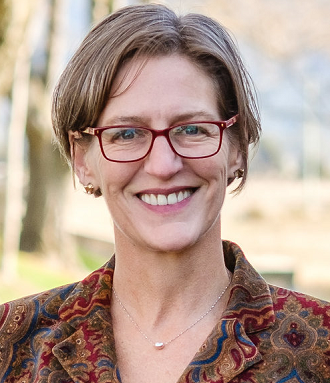
	First party	Second party	Third party
Leader	Will Hodgman	Rebecca White	Cassy O'Connor
Party	Liberal	Labor	Greens
Leader since	30 March 2006	17 March 2017	12 June 2015
Leader's seat	Franklin	Lyons	Denison
Last election	15 seats; 51.22%	7 seats; 27.33%	3 seats; 13.83%
Seats won	13	10	2
Seat change	▼2	▲3	▼1
Popular vote	168,303	109,264	34,491
Percentage	50.26%	32.63%	10.30%
Swing	▼0.96pp	▲5.30pp	▼3.53pp
- Results of the election
Premier before election
Will Hodgman
Liberal
Elected Premier
Will Hodgman
Liberal

The 2018 Tasmanian state election was held on 3 March 2018 to elect all 25 members of the Tasmanian House of Assembly.

The four-year incumbent Liberal government, led by Premier Will Hodgman, won a second consecutive term. It defeated the Labor Party, led by Opposition Leader Rebecca White, and the Greens, led by Cassy O'Connor. The Jacqui Lambie Network also competed in a state election for the first time, though the party did not win any seats and its leader Jacqui Lambie did not stand for election.

The Tasmanian House of Assembly (the lower house) has five divisions with five members each for a total of 25 seats, 13 of which are required for a majority. The divisions correspond in name and boundaries to the five federal electorates for the House of Representatives. The election was conducted by the Tasmanian Electoral Commission using the Hare-Clark electoral system; five candidate are declared elected once each of them reach 16.7% (one-sixth) of the total formal vote during counting.

House of Assembly elections are not tied to the election dates for the Legislative Council (the upper house), which occur in May each year for two or three of the 15 divisions, completing a fixed periodic cycle over six years.

Ultimately, the Liberals suffered a two-seat swing, but were able to hold on to a one-seat majority of 13 seats. It was the first time in 22 years that a Liberal government won a second consecutive term in Tasmania, and the first time since 1986 and only the second time since 1931 that an incumbent conservative government was reelected with an overall majority. It was also the first time a state parliamentary assembly in Australia elected a majority of female members, with thirteen women and twelve men.

== Date ==
Under section 23 of the Constitution Act 1934, terms in the Tasmanian House of Assembly end a maximum of four years from the return of the writs following the previous election, in this case 29 March 2014. The election date is not fixed and can be called at any time with the agreement of the Governor of Tasmania, representing the Crown. The Electoral Act 2004 governs the process of requesting elections. The Governor may then issue writs between five and ten days after the Premier of Tasmania requests an election. Candidate nominations must close on a date seven to 21 days after the issuance of the Governor's writ, and polling day must be a Saturday between 15 and 30 days after candidate nominations close. Accordingly, if the lower house had run to its maximum term in 2018, then the Saturday election date would have been between 28 April and 19 May inclusive. However, on 28 January 2018, Premier Will Hodgman visited the Governor to request issue of writs for an election on 3 March 2018.

== Background ==
The results of the previous election saw a substantial swing to the Liberal Party led by Will Hodgman, defeating the then Labor government led by Lara Giddings, which had governed in majority together with the Greens until shortly before the election. The 2014 election saw the Labor party reduced to seven seats and the Greens reduced to three seats in the Assembly.

Following the loss, Giddings resigned as leader of the Labor Party and was replaced by then opposition Deputy Premier Bryan Green. He subsequently resigned from opposition leadership on 17 March 2017, and Rebecca White was elected Labor leader unopposed. Aside from the Liberals, Labor and Greens, the Jacqui Lambie Network, formed in 2015, fielded several candidates in 2018 and was considered a chance to pick up seats, although they failed to do so. The two other minor parties contesting the 2018 election were the Shooters, Fishers and Farmers Party and the newly formed T4T – Tasmanians 4 Tasmania.

=== Campaign ===
With polls showing that the Greens and Jacqui Lambie Network were polling well, there was speculation that the Liberals could lose their majority. Nonetheless, Hodgman was adamant that he would only govern if the Liberals retained their majority, saying, "We will govern alone or not at all."

The Labor party ran on a policy that claimed it would make Tasmania the first state in the country to remove poker machines from pubs and clubs. During the 2018 campaign Federal Group, the largest operator of gaming venues in Tasmania, admitted to supporting its employees campaigning on a pro-pokie platform. Opposition Labor Leader Rebecca White claimed the Liberal Party outspent the Labor election campaign by a factor of 5 to 1.

Whilst the disclosure of political donations in Tasmania is required annually, and donations below $13,000 don't have to be reported, there were widespread calls for greater transparency in campaign spending in the lead up to the 2018 election. Federal Group had no applicable disclosed donations to the Tasmanian Liberal Party in the applicable yearly period prior to the election (2016–2017). However more recent donations prior to the election date are not required to be disclosed by the Australian Electoral Commission until FYE 2017–18. These disclosures showed that the gambling industry donated over $400,000 to the Liberal Party.

On the day before the election, 2 March 2018, it was revealed that the Liberal Party had tried to push through a plan to soften the state's gun laws, to benefit farm workers and sporting shooters.

== Retiring MPs ==
=== Liberal ===
- Matthew Groom (Denison) – announced retirement 23 September 2017

=== Labor ===
- Lara Giddings (Franklin) – announced retirement 14 May 2017
- David Llewellyn (Lyons) – announced retirement 15 May 2017

== Polling ==
Polling is regularly conducted for Tasmanian state politics by Enterprise Marketing and Research Services (EMRS). The sample size for each EMRS poll is 1,000 Tasmanian voters. Polling is also conducted irregularly by MediaReach, ReachTEL and Roy Morgan Research, the latter with sample sizes of typically a few hundred voters. The sample size for ReachTEL's 24 February 2018 poll was 3,179.

View source data.
Graphical summary of primary voting opinion polls.
View source data.
Graphical summary of Better Premier polling.

House of Assembly (lower house) polling
	Firm	Political parties
	Firm	LIB	ALP	GRN	JLN	ONP	IND/OTH
27 February 2018	EMRS	46%	34%	12%	4%	-	3%
24 February 2018	ReachTEL	48.0%	32.2%	12.5%	5.4%	–	2.1%
January 2018	MediaReach (Note: Tasmanian Liberal Party internal poll, sample size 3000)	41.1%	34.3%	12.8%	6.2%	-	5.6%
December 2017	EMRS	34%	34%	17%	8%	–	6%
August 2017	EMRS	37%	34%	16%	5%	-	7%
May 2017	EMRS	39%	34%	15%	–	3%	9%
March 2017	EMRS	35%	29%	19%	-	6%	11%
November 2016	ReachTEL	45.5%	30.9%	15.1%	–	–	8.5%
November 2016	EMRS	40%	28%	18%	-	-	11%
October 2016	Morgan	39%	33%	16%	–	–	12%
August 2016	EMRS	41%	31%	15%	-	-	13%
August 2016	Morgan	37.5%	36%	15.5%	–	–	11%
July 2016	EMRS	37%	32%	17%	-	-	14%
May 2016	EMRS	41%	29%	21%	–	–	9%
May 2016	Morgan	41%	34.5%	17%	-	-	7.5%
March 2016	Morgan	40%	33%	21.5%	–	–	5.5%
February 2016	EMRS	46%	27%	18%	-	-	9%
November 2015	EMRS	48%	25%	20%	–	–	7%
August 2015	EMRS	40%	29%	21%	-	-	9%
May 2015	EMRS	46%	29%	19%	–	–	6%
February 2015	EMRS	42%	34%	15%	1%^{1}	-	8%
November 2014	EMRS	42%	31%	19%	2%^{1}	–	6%
August 2014	EMRS	46%	33%	16%	2%^{1}	-	4%
May 2014	EMRS	48%	25%	21%	3%^{1}	–	3%
2014 election		51.2%	27.3%	13.8%	5.0%^{1}	-	1.3%
Feb 2014	EMRS	44%	20%	15%	5%^{1}	–	3%
Polling conducted by EMRS.^{1} Palmer United Party (PUP)

Preferred Premier polling^
	Liberal Hodgman	Labor White
January 2018	48.0%	41.4%
August 2017	37%	48%
May 2017	42%	39%
March 2017	52%	20%^{1}
November 2016	59.8%	40.2%^{1}
October 2016	55.5%	44.5%^{1}
July 2016	48%	25%^{1}
February 2016	52%	21%^{1}
November 2015	56%	19%^{1}
August 2015	49%	21%^{1}
May 2015	52%	24%^{1}
February 2015	48%	26%^{1}
November 2014	50%	22%^{1}
August 2014	51%	25%^{1}
May 2014	54%	22%^{1}
2014 election
Feb 2014	48%	21%^{2}
Polling conducted by EMRS.^ Remainder were "uncommitted".^{1} Bryan Green.^{2} Lara Giddings.

== Results ==
Party	Votes	%	+/–	Seats	+/–
Liberal	168,303	50.26	▼0.96	13	▼2
Labor	109,264	32.63	▲5.30	10	▲3
Greens	34,491	10.30	▼3.53	2	▼1
Jacqui Lambie Network	10,579	3.16	▲3.16	0	Steady
Shooters, Fishers, and Farmers	7,640	2.28	▲2.28	0	Steady
Tasmanians 4 Tasmania	985	0.29	▲0.29	0	Steady
Independents	3,609	1.08	▼0.20	0	Steady
Total	334,871	100.00	–	25	–
Valid votes	334,871	95.09			
Invalid/blank votes	17,309	4.91	▲0.11		
Total votes	352,180	100.00	–		
Registered voters/turnout	381,183	92.39	▼1.10		
Source: TEC

=== Primary vote percentages by division ===
	Bass	Braddon	Denison	Franklin	Lyons
Labor Party	26.40%	27.29%	41.85%	34.37%	32.95%
Liberal Party	58.81%	56.08%	37.70%	48.40%	50.55%
Tasmanian Greens	9.28%	3.57%	17.53%	14.36%	6.53%
Other	5.51%	13.05%	2.91%	2.89%	9.97%

=== Current distribution of seats ===
Electorate	Seats held
Bass	
Braddon	
Denison	
Franklin	
Lyons	

Labor
Liberal
Green

== See also ==
- Candidates of the 2018 Tasmanian state election
