= Adam Brooks (politician) =

Australian politician (born 1975)

Minister for Racing Minister for Mining Minister for Building and Construction
- In office 18 February 2016 – 13 June 2016
- Premier: Will Hodgman
- Preceded by: Paul Harriss; Jeremy Rockliff
- Succeeded by: Guy Barnett; Jeremy Rockliff

Member of the Tasmanian House of Assembly for Braddon
- In office 20 March 2010 – 12 February 2019
- Preceded by: Brett Whiteley
- In office 1 May 2021 – 14 May 2021
- Succeeded by: Felix Ellis

Personal details
- Born: Adam Richard Brooks; 16 April 1975 (age 51) Devonport, Tasmania, Australia
- Party: Liberal Party
- Occupation: Mining businessperson
- Website: http://www.adambrooks.com.au/

Adam Richard Brooks (born 16 April 1975) is a former Liberal Party member for Braddon in the Tasmanian House of Assembly from 2010 to 2019. He was an endorsed Liberal Party candidate for the 2021 state election in the division of Braddon, and was re-elected on 1 May, but resigned two weeks after the election following charges being laid against him by Queensland Police for alleged firearms and document offences.

Prior to politics, he worked in the Royal Australian Navy for eight years maintaining missile systems, followed by involvement the mining industry and then as a small businessman.

At the 2010 Tasmanian state election, Brooks was the second highest Liberal candidate securing 9.7% of the primary vote. He improved on this at the 2014 election, being returned as the highest polling candidate overall and achieving the highest number of votes on record within Braddon for any state election, with over 25% of the vote.

Brooks was elevated to cabinet on 18 February 2016, after a reshuffle triggered by the resignation of Paul Harriss as Minister for Resources. Brooks was appointed Minister for Mining, taking over part of Harriss' former portfolio, Minister for Racing, previously held by Jeremy Rockliff, and the new role of Minister for Building and Construction.

Brooks resigned from his ministerial positions on 13 June 2016 following concerns over a perceived conflict of interest between his mining portfolio and his business interests. He was subsequently cleared of any conflict of interest by an independent commission enquiry.

He abruptly resigned from parliament on 11 February 2019, with effect from the next day, after a harshly critical Integrity Commission report into his use of his mining service company email.

In May 2021, it was reported that the Victorian Department of Transport had referred to Tasmanian police an allegation that Brooks had used a fraudulent document. A Sydney woman alleged Brooks showed her what appeared to be a VicRoads driving licence, to convince her he was named Terry. During an eight-month relationship, she said she understood he was an engineer who lived in Melbourne.

On 14 May 2021, the day after Brooks was declared re-elected, the Queensland Police Service announced it had charged him with firearms offences, including possession of a handgun, unlawful possession of explosives, and dealing with identity documents. The police alleged that the gun, explosives and fake drivers' licences were seized during a raid on Brooks' Redcliffe property. Premier Peter Gutwein announced that Brooks had resigned from parliament, and would not take his seat.

Political offices
New ministerial post	Minister for Building and Construction; 2016	Succeeded by Peter Gutwein
New ministerial post	Minister for Consumer Affairs and Red Tape Reduction; 2016	Ministry abolished
Preceded by Paul Harriss as Minister for Resources	Minister for Mining; 2016	Succeeded by Rene Hidding
Preceded by Jeremy Rockliff	Minister for Racing; 2016	Succeeded by Jeremy Rockliff
