= Results of the 2006 Tasmanian state election =

Tasmanian state election, 18 March 2006 House of Assembly << 2002–2010 >>
Enrolled voters	341,481				
Votes cast	324,008		Turnout	94.88	+1.15
Informal votes	14,386		Informal	4.44	–0.436
Summary of votes by party
Party	Primary votes	%	Swing	Seats	Change
Labor	152,544	49.27	–2.61	14	± 0
Liberal	98,511	31.82	+4.43	7	± 0
Greens	51,501	16.63	–1.50	4	± 0
Tasmania First	1,602	0.52	+0.34	0	± 0
Socialist Alliance	494	0.16	–0.08	0	± 0
Independent	4,970	1.61	+0.10	0	± 0
Total	309,622			25	

This is a list of House of Assembly results for the 2006 Tasmanian election.

== Results by Division ==
=== Bass ===
2006 Tasmanian state election: Bass
Party	Candidate	Votes	%	±%
Quota		10,117		
Labor	Michelle O'Byrne (elected 1)	14,146	23.3	+23.3
Labor	Jim Cox (elected 2)	9,286	15.3	−2.2
Labor	Steve Reissig	2,755	4.5	+4.5
Labor	Grant Courtney	1,723	2.8	+2.8
Labor	Michelle Cripps	1,303	2.1	+2.1
Labor	Mike Greene	897	1.5	+1.5
Liberal	Peter Gutwein (elected 3)	8,218	13.5	+4.4
Liberal	Sue Napier (elected 4)	5,717	9.4	−1.9
Liberal	David Fry	4,274	7.0	−0.1
Liberal	Sam McQuestin	1,745	2.9	+2.9
Liberal	Pamela Fratangelo	550	0.9	+0.9
Greens	Kim Booth (elected 5)	5,653	9.3	−2.2
Greens	Jeremy Ball	1,110	1.8	+1.8
Greens	Kate Case	584	1.0	+1.0
Greens	Jill Thompson	540	0.9	+0.9
Greens	Peter Cover	344	0.6	+0.6
Independent	Les Rochester	1,178	1.9	+1.9
Tasmania First	Robert Wallace	411	0.7	−0.2
Independent	Jim Collier	265	0.4	+0.4
Total formal votes		60,699	95.3	+0.5
Informal votes		3,004	4.7	−0.5
Turnout		63,703	94.9	+1.0
Party total votes
Labor		30,110	49.6	+0.5
Liberal		20,504	33.8	+2.4
Greens		8,231	13.6	−2.9
Independent	Les Rochester	1,178	1.9	+1.9
Tasmania First		411	0.7	−0.2
Independent	Jim Collier	265	0.4	+0.4

=== Braddon ===
2006 Tasmanian state election: Braddon
Party	Candidate	Votes	%	±%
Quota		10,552		
Labor	Bryan Green (elected 1)	15,468	24.4	+7.4
Labor	Steve Kons (elected 3)	6,988	11.0	−3.0
Labor	Brenton Best (elected 4)	6,378	10.1	−0.6
Labor	Peter Hollister	2,135	3.4	+3.4
Labor	Leonie Batchelor	1,215	1.9	+1.9
Liberal	Jeremy Rockliff (elected 2)	9,630	15.2	+2.1
Liberal	Brett Whiteley (elected 5)	5,529	8.7	+1.3
Liberal	Heather Woodward	3,179	5.0	+5.0
Liberal	Leon Perry	2,977	4.7	+4.7
Liberal	John Oldaker	2,280	3.6	+3.6
Greens	Paul O'Halloran	4,297	6.8	+0.3
Greens	Andrea Jackson	669	1.1	+1.1
Greens	Dianne Ransley	624	1.0	+1.0
Greens	Scott Jordan	545	0.9	+0.9
Greens	John Coombes	394	0.6	+0.6
Independent	Steve Martin	1,001	1.6	+1.6
Total formal votes		63,309	95.4	+0.2
Informal votes		3,085	4.6	−0.2
Turnout		66,394	95.1	+0.8
Party total votes
Labor		32,184	50.8	−2.3
Liberal		23,595	37.2	+4.1
Greens		6,529	10.4	−1.7
Independent	Steve Martin	1,001	1.6	+1.6

=== Denison ===
2006 Tasmanian state election: Denison
Party	Candidate	Votes	%	±%
Quota		10,257		
Labor	David Bartlett (elected 3)	7,982	13.0	+8.7
Labor	Graeme Sturges (elected 5)	5,922	9.6	+4.9
Labor	Lisa Singh (elected 4)	5,760	9.4	+9.4
Labor	Louise Sullivan	4,067	6.6	+6.6
Labor	Julie Collins	3,703	6.0	+6.0
Labor	Joe Ritchie	1,449	2.4	+2.4
Liberal	Michael Hodgman (elected 2)	7,436	12.1	+5.1
Liberal	Fabian Dixon	3,596	5.8	+5.8
Liberal	Richard Lowrie	2,239	3.6	+3.6
Liberal	Elise Archer	1,939	3.2	+3.2
Liberal	John Klonaris	1,130	1.8	+1.8
Greens	Peg Putt (elected 1)	11,338	18.4	−1.6
Greens	Cassy O'Connor	2,426	3.9	+3.9
Greens	Marrette Corby	371	0.6	+0.6
Greens	Bill Harvey	364	0.6	+0.6
Greens	Toby Rowallan	313	0.5	+0.5
Group F	Michael Fracalossi	309	0.5	+0.5
Group F	Paul Glover	89	0.1	+0.1
Group F	Ken Higgs	43	0.1	+0.1
Tasmania First	Kevin Pelham	190	0.3	+0.3
Tasmania First	Eric Zeppenfeld	135	0.2	+0.2
Independent	Leo Foley	271	0.4	+0.4
Socialist Alliance	Linda Seaborn	237	0.4	+0.4
Independent	Hugh Miller	229	0.4	+0.4
Total formal votes		61,538	95.7	0.0
Informal votes		2,747	4.3	0.0
Turnout		64,285	94.2	+1.6
Party total votes
Labor		28,883	47.0	−3.9
Liberal		16,340	26.5	+3.6
Greens		14,812	24.0	−0.4
Group F		441	0.7	+0.7
Tasmania First		325	0.5	+0.5
Independent	Leo Foley	271	0.4	+0.4
Socialist Alliance		237	0.4	+0.4
Independent	Hugh Miller	229	0.4	+0.4

=== Franklin ===
2006 Tasmanian state election: Franklin
Party	Candidate	Votes	%	±%
Quota		10,660		
Labor	Paul Lennon (elected 1)	16,666	26.1	+7.9
Labor	Lara Giddings (elected 4)	6,725	10.5	+1.3
Labor	Paula Wriedt (elected 5)	5,089	8.0	−5.9
Labor	Ross Butler	1,066	1.7	+1.7
Labor	Daniel Hulme	620	1.0	+1.0
Liberal	Will Hodgman (elected 2)	14,055	22.0	+9.6
Liberal	Vanessa Goodwin	2,779	4.3	+4.3
Liberal	Steve Allie	1,575	2.5	+2.5
Liberal	Sue Bastone	866	1.4	+1.4
Liberal	Tony Scott	786	1.2	+1.2
Greens	Nick McKim (elected 3)	10,191	15.9	+3.3
Greens	Jane MacDonald	887	1.4	+1.4
Greens	Mike Anderson	478	0.7	+0.7
Greens	Mark Rickards	470	0.7	+0.7
Greens	Gerard Velnaar	394	0.6	+0.6
Independent	Ian Hall	564	0.9	+0.9
Independent	Richard James	489	0.8	+0.8
Socialist Alliance	Matthew Holloway	257	0.4	+0.4
Total formal votes		63,957	96.1	+0.7
Informal votes		2,566	3.9	−0.7
Turnout		66,523	95.2	+1.3
Party total votes
Labor		30,166	47.3	−4.6
Liberal		20,061	31.4	+7.6
Greens		12,420	19.3	−1.0
Independent	Ian Hall	564	0.9	+0.9
Independent	Richard James	489	0.8	+0.8
Socialist Alliance		257	0.4	+0.1

=== Lyons ===
2006 Tasmanian state election: Lyons
Party	Candidate	Votes	%	±%
Quota		10,020		
Labor	Michael Polley (elected 1)	12,741	21.2	+5.9
Labor	David Llewellyn (elected 2)	11,036	18.4	−1.2
Labor	Heather Butler (elected 4)	3,612	6.0	+2.9
Labor	Kerry DeGrassi	2,361	3.9	+3.9
Labor	Malcolm Upston	1,451	2.4	+2.4
Liberal	Rene Hidding (elected 3)	8,455	14.1	+7.0
Liberal	Geoff Page	3,757	6.2	+6.2
Liberal	Jane Howlett	2,733	4.5	+4.5
Liberal	Richard Shoobridge	1,601	2.7	+2.7
Liberal	Andrew Wright	1,465	2.4	+2.4
Greens	Tim Morris (elected 5)	6,326	10.5	+1.4
Greens	Annie Willock	901	1.5	−0.9
Greens	Karen Cassidy	897	1.5	−0.8
Greens	Helen Gee	885	1.5	+1.5
Greens	Frederika Perey	500	0.8	+0.8
Tasmania First	Gordon Crawford	866	1.4	+1.4
Independent	Geoff Dickinson	354	0.6	+0.6
Independent	Geoff Wharton	178	0.3	+0.3
Total formal votes		60,119	95.3	+0.7
Informal votes		2,984	4.7	−0.7
Turnout		63,103	95.1	+1.3
Party total votes
Labor		31,201	51.9	−2.7
Liberal		18,011	29.9	+4.2
Greens		9,509	15.8	−1.3
Tasmania First		866	1.4	+1.4
Independent	Geoff Dickinson	354	0.6	+0.6
Independent	Geoff Wharton	178	0.3	+0.3

== See also ==
- 2006 Tasmanian state election
- Candidates of the 2006 Tasmanian state election
- Members of the Tasmanian House of Assembly, 2006–2010
