= Candidates of the 2006 Tasmanian state election =

This article provides information on candidates who stood for the 2006 Tasmanian state election. The election was held on 18 March 2006.

== Retiring Members ==
=== Labor ===
- Kathryn Hay MLA (Bass)
- Judy Jackson MLA (Denison)

== House of Assembly ==
Sitting members at the time of the election are shown in bold text. Tickets that elected at least one MHA are highlighted in the relevant colour. Successful candidates are indicated by an asterisk (*).

=== Bass ===
Five seats were up for election. The Labor Party was defending two seats. The Liberal Party was defending two seats. The Greens were defending one seat.

Labor candidates	Liberal candidates	Greens candidates	TFP candidates	Ungrouped candidates
Grant Courtney; **Jim Cox***; Michelle Cripps; Mike Greene; Michelle O'Byrne*; Steve Reissig	Pamela Fratangelo; David Fry; **Peter Gutwein***; Sam McQuestin; **Sue Napier***	Jeremy Ball; **Kim Booth***; Kate Case; Peter Cover; Jill Thompson	Robert Wallace	Jim Collier; Les Rochester

=== Braddon ===
Five seats were up for election. The Labor Party was defending three seats. The Liberal Party was defending two seats.

Labor candidates	Liberal candidates	Greens candidates	Group C candidates
Leonie Batchelor; **Brenton Best***; **Bryan Green***; Peter Hollister; **Steve Kons***	John Oldaker; Leon Perry; **Jeremy Rockliff***; **Brett Whiteley***; Heather Woodward	John Coombes; Andrea Jackson; Scott Jordan; Paul O'Halloran; Dianne Ransley	Steve Martin

=== Denison ===
Five seats were up for election. The Labor Party was defending three seats. The Liberal Party was defending one seat. The Greens were defending one seat.

Labor candidates	Liberal candidates	Greens candidates	TFP candidates	Socialist candidates	Group F candidates	Ungrouped candidates
**David Bartlett***; Julie Collins; Joe Ritchie; Lisa Singh*; **Graeme Sturges***; Louise Sullivan	Elise Archer; Fabian Dixon; **Michael Hodgman***; John Klonaris; Richard Lowrie	Marrette Corby; Bill Harvey; Cassy O'Connor; **Peg Putt***; Toby Rowallan	Kevin Pelham; Eric Zeppenfeld	Linda Seaborn	Michael Fracalossi; Paul Glover; Ken Higgs	Leo Foley; Hugh Miller

=== Franklin ===
Five seats were up for election. The Labor Party was defending three seats. The Liberal Party was defending one seat. The Greens were defending one seat.

Labor candidates	Liberal candidates	Greens candidates	Socialist candidates	Ungrouped candidates
Ross Butler; **Lara Giddings***; Daniel Hulme; **Paul Lennon***; **Paula Wriedt***	Steve Allie; Sue Bastone; Vanessa Goodwin; **Will Hodgman***; Tony Scott	Mike Anderson; Jane MacDonald; **Nick McKim***; Mark Rickards; Gerard Velnaar	Matthew Holloway	Ian Hall; Richard James

=== Lyons ===
Five seats were up for election. The Labor Party was defending three seats. The Liberal Party was defending one seat. The Greens were defending one seat.

Labor candidates	Liberal candidates	Greens candidates	TFP candidates	Ungrouped candidates
**Heather Butler***; Kerri DeGrassi; **David Llewellyn***; **Michael Polley***; Malcolm Upston	**Rene Hidding***; Jane Howlett; Geoff Page; Richard Shoobridge; Andrew Wright	Karen Cassidy; Helen Gee; **Tim Morris***; Frederika Perey; Annie Willock	Gordon Crawford	Geoff Dickinson; Geoff Wharton

== See also ==
- Members of the Tasmanian House of Assembly, 2002–2006
- Members of the Tasmanian House of Assembly, 2006–2010
