= Candidates of the 2010 Tasmanian state election =

This article provides information on candidates who stood for the 2010 Tasmanian state election.

== Retiring Members ==
=== Labor ===
- Jim Cox MP (Bass)
- Steve Kons MP (Braddon)

=== Liberal ===
- Michael Hodgman MP (Denison)
- Sue Napier MP (Bass)

== House of Assembly ==
Sitting members at the time of the election are shown in bold text. Tickets that elected at least one MHA are highlighted in the relevant colour. Successful candidates are indicated by an asterisk (*).

=== Bass ===
Five seats were up for election. The Labor Party was defending two seats. The Liberal Party was defending two seats. The Tasmanian Greens were defending one seat.

Labor candidates	Liberal candidates	Greens candidates	Ungrouped candidates
Michelle Cripps; Scott McLean; **Michelle O'Byrne***; Brant Webb; Brian Wightman*	Pam Dakin; Michael Ferguson*; **Peter Gutwein***; Michele McGinity; Nick Pedley	Jeremy Ball; **Kim Booth***; Sally Day; Beverley Ernst; Peter Whish-Wilson	Jim Collier; Peter Kaye; Tim Parish; Mark Webb; Sven Wiener

=== Braddon ===
Five seats were up for election. The Labor Party was defending three seats. The Liberal Party was defending two seats.

Labor candidates	Liberal candidates	Greens candidates	Ungrouped candidates
**Brenton Best***; Shane Broad; Kay Eastley; **Bryan Green***; Judy Richmond	Adam Brooks*; Grant Dunham; Leonie Hiscutt; Colin Lamont; Philip Lamont; **Jeremy Rockliff***; **Brett Whiteley**	Ted Field; Claire Gilmour; David Henderson; Melissa Houghton; Paul O'Halloran*	Valerie Blake; Timothy Kidd

=== Denison ===
Five seats were up for election. The Labor Party was defending three seats. The Liberal Party was defending one seat. The Tasmanian Greens were defending one seat.

Labor candidates	Liberal candidates	Greens candidates	Socialist candidates	Independent candidates
Scott Bacon*; **David Bartlett***; Madeleine Ogilvie; **Lisa Singh**; **Graeme Sturges**	Elise Archer*; Jenny Branch; Matthew Groom*; Richard Lowrie; Matt Stevenson	Penelope Ann; Helen Burnet; Peter Cover; Kartika Franks; **Cassy O'Connor***	Melanie Barnes	Andrew Wilkie

=== Franklin ===
Five seats were up for election. The Labor Party was defending three seats. The Liberal Party was defending one seat. The Tasmanian Greens were defending one seat.

Labor candidates	Liberal candidates	Greens candidates	Socialist candidates	Ungrouped candidates
**Ross Butler**; Kate Churchill; **Lara Giddings***; **Daniel Hulme**; David O'Byrne*	David Compton; **Will Hodgman***; Jillian Law; Tony Mulder; Jacquie Petrusma*	Deborah Brewer; Adam Burling; Mark Harrison; Wendy Heatley; **Nick McKim***	Jenny Forward	John Forster

=== Lyons ===
Five seats were up for election. The Labor Party was defending three seats. The Liberal Party was defending one seat. The Tasmanian Greens were defending one seat.

Labor candidates	Liberal candidates	Greens candidates
**Heather Butler**; **David Llewellyn**; **Michael Polley***; Brendan Sullivan; Rebecca White*; Nick Wright	Leigh Gray; **Rene Hidding***; Jane Howlett; Jim Playsted; Mark Shelton*	Karen Cassidy; Jackie Graham; **Tim Morris***; Sharon Prior; Karl Stevens

== See also ==
- Members of the Tasmanian House of Assembly, 2006–2010
