= Results of the 2010 Tasmanian state election =

Tasmanian state election, 20 March 2010 House of Assembly << 2006–2014 >>
Enrolled voters	357,315				
Votes cast	335,353		Turnout	93.85	−1.03
Informal votes	14,915		Informal	4.45	+0.01
Summary of votes by party
Party	Primary votes	%	Swing	Seats	Change
Liberal	124,933	38.99	+7.17	10	+3
Labor	118,168	36.88	−12.39	10	−4
Greens	69,233	21.61	+4.97	5	+1
Socialist Alliance	646	0.20	+0.04	0	0
Independent	7,458	2.33	+0.72	0	0
Total	320,438			25	

This is a list of House of Assembly results for the 2010 Tasmanian election.

== Results by Division ==
=== Bass ===
2010 Tasmanian state election: Bass
Party	Candidate	Votes	%	±%
Quota		10,617		
Liberal	Michael Ferguson (elected 1)	15,911	25.0	+25.0
Liberal	Peter Gutwein (elected 3)	9,060	14.2	+0.7
Liberal	Michele McGinty	1,244	2.0	+2.0
Liberal	Nick Pedley	536	0.8	+0.8
Liberal	Pam Dakin	413	0.6	+0.6
Labor	Michelle O'Byrne (elected 2)	11,380	17.9	−5.4
Labor	Brian Wightman (elected 5)	3,191	5.0	+5.0
Labor	Scott McLean	3,090	4.9	+4.9
Labor	Brant Webb	2,699	4.2	+4.2
Labor	Michelle Cripps	1,627	2.6	+2.6
Greens	Kim Booth (elected 4)	8,853	13.9	+4.6
Greens	Jeremy Ball	2,226	3.5	+1.7
Greens	Peter Whish-Wilson	1,209	1.9	+1.9
Greens	Sally Day	675	1.1	+1.1
Greens	Bev Ernst	380	0.6	+0.6
Independent	Tim Parish	484	0.8	+0.8
Independent	Peter Kaye	279	0.4	+0.4
Independent	Jim Collier	162	0.3	−0.1
Independent	Mark Webb	158	0.2	+0.2
Independent	Sven Wiener	121	0.2	+0.2
Total formal votes		63,698	95.3	0.0
Informal votes		3,162	4.7	0.0
Turnout		66,860	93.8	−1.1
Party total votes
Liberal		27,164	42.6	+8.9
Labor		21,987	34.5	−15.2
Greens		13,343	21.0	+7.4
Independent	Tim Parish	484	0.8	+0.8
Independent	Peter Kaye	279	0.4	+0.4
Independent	Jim Collier	162	0.3	−0.1
Independent	Mark Webb	158	0.2	+0.2
Independent	Sven Wiener	121	0.2	+0.2

=== Braddon ===
2010 Tasmanian state election: Braddon
Party	Candidate	Votes	%	±%
Quota		10,747		
Liberal	Jeremy Rockliff (elected 2)	10,994	17.1	+1.9
Liberal	Adam Brooks (elected 4)	6,972	10.8	+10.8
Liberal	Brett Whiteley	5,547	8.6	−0.1
Liberal	Leonie Hiscutt	2,715	4.2	+4.2
Liberal	Grant Dunham	1,201	1.9	+1.9
Liberal	Philip Lamont	1,115	1.7	+1.7
Liberal	Colin Lamont	594	0.9	+0.9
Labor	Bryan Green (elected 1)	11,221	17.4	−7.0
Labor	Brenton Best (elected 3)	7,087	11.0	+0.9
Labor	Shane Broad	3,303	5.1	+5.1
Labor	Judy Richmond	2,309	3.6	+3.6
Labor	Kay Eastley	2,027	3.1	+3.1
Greens	Paul O'Halloran (elected 5)	5,718	8.9	+2.1
Greens	Ted Field	894	1.4	+1.4
Greens	Clair Gilmour	781	1.2	+1.2
Greens	David Henderson	746	1.2	+1.2
Greens	Melissa Houghton	735	1.1	+1.1
Independent	Timothy Kidd	270	0.4	+0.4
Independent	Valerie Blake	247	0.4	+0.4
Total formal votes		64,476	95.1	−0.3
Informal votes		3,297	4.9	+0.3
Turnout		67,773	94.1	−1.0
Party total votes
Liberal		29,138	45.2	+8.6
Labor		25,947	40.2	−11.2
Greens		8,874	13.8	+3.4
Independent	Timothy Kidd	270	0.4	+0.4
Independent	Valerie Blake	247	0.4	+0.4

=== Denison ===
2010 Tasmanian state election: Denison
Party	Candidate	Votes	%	±%
Quota		10,630		
Labor	David Bartlett (elected 2)	10,169	15.9	+2.9
Labor	Scott Bacon (elected 4)	7,356	11.5	+11.5
Labor	Lisa Singh	3,833	6.0	−3.4
Labor	Graeme Sturges	1,185	1.9	−7.7
Labor	Madeleine Ogilvie	608	1.0	+1.0
Liberal	Matthew Groom (elected 3)	9,602	15.1	+15.1
Liberal	Richard Lowrie	3,138	4.9	+1.3
Liberal	Elise Archer (elected 5)	2,999	4.7	+1.5
Liberal	Matt Stevenson	1,834	2.9	+2.9
Liberal	Jenny Branch	1,428	2.2	+2.2
Greens	Cassy O'Connor (elected 1)	10,336	16.2	+12.3
Greens	Helen Burnet	3,142	4.9	+4.9
Greens	Peter Cover	875	1.4	+1.4
Greens	Penelope Ann	811	1.3	+1.3
Greens	Kartika Franks	713	1.1	+1.1
Independent	Andrew Wilkie	5,382	8.4	+8.4
Socialist Alliance	Melanie Barnes	365	0.6	+0.6
Total formal votes		63,776	96.2	+0.5
Informal votes		2,541	3.8	−0.5
Turnout		66,317	93.0	+0.7
Party total votes
Labor		23,151	36.3	−10.5
Liberal		19,001	29.8	+3.1
Greens		15,877	24.9	+0.8
Independent	Andrew Wilkie	5,382	8.4	+8.4
Socialist Alliance		365	0.6	+0.2

=== Franklin ===
2010 Tasmanian state election: Franklin
Party	Candidate	Votes	%	±%
Quota		10,675		
Liberal	Will Hodgman (elected 1)	20,302	31.7	+9.7
Liberal	Jacquie Petrusma (elected 5)	2,500	3.9	+3.9
Liberal	Tony Mulder	2,106	3.3	+3.3
Liberal	Jillian Law	884	1.4	+1.4
Liberal	David Compton	576	0.9	+0.9
Labor	Lara Giddings (elected 3)	9,648	15.1	+4.6
Labor	David O'Byrne (elected 4)	4,846	7.6	+7.6
Labor	Daniel Hulme	2,214	3.5	+2.5
Labor	Ross Butler	1,854	2.9	+1.2
Labor	Kate Churchill	964	1.5	+1.5
Greens	Nick McKim (elected 2)	15,462	24.1	+8.2
Greens	Wendy Heatley	621	1.0	+1.0
Greens	Adam Burling	495	0.8	+0.8
Greens	Deborah Brewer	478	0.7	+0.7
Greens	Mark Harrison	459	0.7	+0.7
Independent	John Forster	355	0.6	+0.6
Socialist Alliance	Jenny Forward	281	0.4	+0.4
Total formal votes		64,045	96.2	+0.1
Informal votes		2,548	3.8	−0.1
Turnout		66,593	94.7	−0.5
Party total votes
Liberal		26,368	41.2	+9.2
Labor		19,526	30.5	−15.6
Greens		17,515	27.3	+7.4
Independent	John Forster	355	0.6	+0.6
Socialist Alliance		281	0.4	0.0

=== Lyons ===
2010 Tasmanian state election: Lyons
Party	Candidate	Votes	%	±%
Quota		10,741		
Labor	Michael Polley (elected 4)	8,302	12.9	−8.3
Labor	David Llewellyn	6,612	10.3	−8.1
Labor	Rebecca White (elected 5)	6,453	10.0	+10.0
Labor	Heather Butler	2,540	3.9	−2.1
Labor	Nick Wright	2,357	3.7	+3.7
Labor	Brendan Sullivan	1,293	2.0	+2.0
Liberal	Rene Hidding (elected 2)	7,608	11.8	−2.3
Liberal	Mark Shelton (elected 3)	5,263	8.2	+8.2
Liberal	Jane Howlett	4,497	7.0	+2.5
Liberal	Jim Playsted	4,027	6.2	+6.2
Liberal	Leigh Gray	1,867	2.9	+2.9
Greens	Tim Morris (elected 1)	9,108	14.1	+3.6
Greens	Karen Cassidy	1,593	2.5	+1.0
Greens	Jackie Graham	1,039	1.6	+1.6
Greens	Karl Stevens	1,013	1.6	+1.6
Greens	Sharon Prior	871	1.4	+1.4
Total formal votes		64,443	95.0	−0.3
Informal votes		3,367	5.0	+0.3
Turnout		67,810	93.7	−1.4
Party total votes
Labor		27,557	42.8	−9.5
Liberal		23,262	36.1	+6.1
Greens		13,624	21.1	+5.8

== See also ==
- 2010 Tasmanian state election
- Candidates of the 2010 Tasmanian state election
- Members of the Tasmanian House of Assembly, 2010–2014
