= Members of the Tasmanian House of Assembly, 2006–2010 =

This is a list of members of the Tasmanian House of Assembly, elected at the 2006 state election.

Name	Party	Electorate	Years in office
Hon David Bartlett	Labor	Denison	2004–2011
Brenton Best	Labor	Braddon	1996–2014
Kim Booth	Greens	Bass	2002–2015
Heather Butler	Labor	Lyons	2005–2010
Ross Butler^{[1]}	Labor	Franklin	2008–2010
Hon Jim Cox	Labor	Bass	1989–1992, 1996–2010
Hon Lara Giddings	Labor	Franklin	1996–1998, 2002–2018
Bryan Green	Labor	Braddon	1998–2017
Peter Gutwein	Liberal	Bass	2002–2022
Rene Hidding	Liberal	Lyons	1996–2019
Hon Michael Hodgman	Liberal	Denison	1992–1998, 2001–2010
Hon Will Hodgman	Liberal	Franklin	2002–2020
Daniel Hulme^{[3]}	Labor	Franklin	2009–2010
Hon Steve Kons	Labor	Braddon	1998–2010
Hon Paul Lennon^{[1]}	Labor	Franklin	1990–2008
Hon David Llewellyn	Labor	Lyons	1986–2010, 2014–2018
Nick McKim	Greens	Franklin	2002–2015
Tim Morris	Greens	Lyons	2002–2014
Hon Sue Napier	Liberal	Bass	1992–2010
Hon Michelle O'Byrne	Labor	Bass	2006–2025
Cassy O'Connor^{[2]}	Greens	Denison	2008–2023
Hon Michael Polley	Labor	Lyons	1972–2014
Peg Putt^{[2]}	Greens	Denison	1993–2008
Jeremy Rockliff	Liberal	Braddon	2002–present
Hon Lisa Singh	Labor	Denison	2006–2010
Hon Graeme Sturges	Labor	Denison	2002–2010, 2011–2014
Brett Whiteley	Liberal	Braddon	2002–2010
Hon Paula Wriedt^{[3]}	Labor	Franklin	1996–2009

^{1} Labor MHA for Franklin and outgoing Premier of Tasmania, Paul Lennon, resigned on 27 May 2008. Ross Butler was elected as his replacement on 10 June 2008.
^{2} Tasmanian Greens MHA for Denison and party leader, Peg Putt, resigned on 7 July 2008. Cassy O'Connor was elected as her replacement on 21 July 2008. Putt was replaced as leader by Nick McKim.
^{3} Labor MHA for Franklin, Paula Wriedt, resigned on 18 January 2009. Daniel Hulme was elected as her replacement on 2 February 2009.

== Distribution of seats ==
Electorate	Seats held
Bass	
Braddon	
Denison	
Franklin	
Lyons	

Australian Labor Party – 14 seats (56%)
Liberal Party of Australia – 7 seats (28%)
Tasmanian Greens – 4 seats (16%)

== See also ==
- List of past members of the Tasmanian House of Assembly
