= Tony Harrison (disambiguation) =

Tony Harrison (1937–2025) was an English poet and playwright.

Tony Harrison may also refer to:

- Tony Harrison (boxer) (born 1990), American professional boxer
- Tony Harrison (lobbyist), Australian lobbyist
- Tony Harrison, a character in the TV series The Mighty Boosh

== See also ==
- Anthony Harrison
- Tony Harris (disambiguation)
- Tory Harrison
