= Climate change in Tasmania =

Climate change in Tasmania affects various environments and industries, including agriculture.

== Greenhouse gas emissions ==
The state's emissions amounted to 15.5 million tonnes in 2005 compared to -4.34 million tonnes in 2022. Due to dry conditions, the Tasmanian government imported more fossil fuel energy in 2024.

Tasmania reached net-zero in 2015. Tasmania is of the world's few jurisdictions which removes more greenhouse gases from the atmosphere than it emits. A reduction in the rate of logging was a major factor in the reduction of emissions.

== Impacts of climate change ==
=== Eucalypt forests ===
Climate change is reducing the rate at which carbon can be sequestered by eucalypt trees.

=== Reduced precipitation ===
Total summer rainfall decreased by 43%.

=== Bushfires and bushfire risk ===
In the "worst-case" scenario, the risk of a bushfire occurring would "double". Potentially, mercury pollution from previous decades and stored in trees may have been released during the 2019-2020 bushfire season.

=== Viticulture ===
Tasmania would become more amenable to grape farming as temperatures rise, compared to mainland Australia which would become less amenable to grape farming.

== Response ==
=== Policies ===
In July 2024, the Australian federal government approved gas permits in waters off Tasmania.

Metro Tasmania introduced electric buses and hydrogen fuel-cell electric buses in Hobart, though this was later paused.

=== Legislation ===
==== Climate Change (State Action) Act 2008 ====
Climate Change (State Action) Act 2008

Parliament of Tasmania
- Long title: An Act for certain measures to help the State address the challenges of climate change and contribute to the broader national and international response to those challenges and for related purposes
- Citation: No 36 of 2008
- Assented to: 2008-10-22

Legislative history
- Bill title: Climate Change (State Action) Bill 2008
- Bill citation: 40 of 2008
- Introduced by: David John Bartlett

Keywords
- emissions targets
- Status: In force

The Act requires that Tasmania reduce its emissions 60% by 2050 compared to 1990 levels.

Inspired by corresponding legislation in South Australia, the law also requires the setting of interim targets by the Tasmanian Government.

Unlike other legislation such as the Climate Change Act 2008, the setting of the interim targets is not managed by an independent body, equivalent to the Climate Change Committee. Although was suggested as part of a proposed Safe Climate Bill, by the Tasmanian Greens.

The Tasmanian Government failed to publish the 2009 and 2014 State of the Environment reports that it is required to under the Act.

== See also ==
- Climate change in Australia
