= Tasmanians for a Better Future =

Australian political group

Tasmanians for a Better Future was an Australian political group that formed ahead of the 2006 Tasmanian state election.

The group placed advertisements encouraging people to vote for majority government to avoid electing a minority government. A minority government would have shifted power in favor of the Tasmanian Greens.

The advertisements were authorised under the name of Tony Harrison, who ran the Corporate Communications public relations company.

== See also ==
- Parliament of Tasmania
