= 1988 New Year Honours (Australia) =

The New Year Honours 1988 were appointments by Queen Elizabeth II to various orders and honours to reward and highlight good works by citizens of those countries, and honorary ones to citizens of other countries. They were announced on 31 December 1988 to celebrate the year passed and mark the beginning of 1989 in Australia

== Knight Bachelor ==
State of Queensland

- Walter John Burnett. For services to the community.

== Order of the Bath ==
=== Companion of the Order of the Bath (CB) ===
Civil Division

State of Tasmania

- John Russell Ashton. For public service.

== Order of Saint Michael and Saint George ==
=== Companion of the Order of St Michael and St George (CMG) ===
State of Queensland

- John Hayward Andrews. For public service.

== Order of the British Empire ==
=== Commander of the Order of the British Empire (CBE) ===
Civil Division

State of Queensland

- Clyde Ian Barclay. For services to the building industry and to the community.

State of Tasmania

- Edmund Alexander Rouse. For services to the community.

=== Officer of the Order of the British Empire (OBE) ===
Civil Division

State of Queensland

- Donald Francis McDonald. For services to the community.
- Gavin Samuel McDonald. For services to the mining community.
- The Reverend Andrew Robert Wilson. For services to the church and the community.
- Rodney Malcolm Wylie. For services to the accounting profession and the community.

State of Tasmania

- Patrick Guy Crisp. For services to the community.

=== Member of the Order of the British Empire (MBE) ===
Civil Division

State of Queensland

- Helen Thorburn Banff. For services to nursing.
- John Gordon Earl. For services to North Queensland.
- The Reverend Stuart McFarlane James. For services to soil conservation.
- Clive William Lanham. For services to the church and the community.
- Malcolm David McNeilly. For services to the surf life saving movement.
- Philip Roy Scott. For services to the Royal Flying Doctor Service.
- Nelson Albert Hunt Sharp. For services to the pharmaceutical profession.
- Joseph Don Wall. For services to the beef industry and the community.

State of Tasmania

- The Reverend Monsignor Philip Richard Green. For services to the church.

== Companion of the Imperial Service Order (ISO) ==
State of Queensland

- Ivan George Harrison. For public service.

== British Empire Medal (BEM) ==
Civil Division

State of Queensland

- Minnie Joyce Haig. For services to the community.
- Jean Hunter. For services to the community.
- Douglas Lesanto Maclean. For services to ex-servicemen and women.
- Allan Albert Maskell. For services to the community.
- Ruth Margaret Maynard. For services to the community.
- Thelma Sara McConnel. For services to disabled children.
- Margaret Alice Moore. For services to the community.
- Alma Palmer. For public service.
- Matron Carmel Margaret Pringle. For services to the aged.
- Richard David Richmond Rex. For services to the community.
- Walter Henry Speedy. For services to the community.
- Laurence John Storey. For services to the community.

State of Tasmania

- Kathleen Mary Cooper. For services to the community.
- Frank Hesman. For services to migrant families.
- Sabina Kolodziej. For services to the community.

== Queen's Police Medal (QPM) ==
State of Queensland

- Terrence Peter McMahon, Assistant Commissioner of Police.
