= The South West Book =

1978 book about region in Tasmania

The South West Book – A Tasmanian Wilderness
- Author: Helen Gee and Janet Fenton (editors)
- Language: English
- Publisher: Australian Conservation Foundation
- Publication date: 1978
- Publication place: Australia
- Media type: Print
- Pages: 308
- ISBN: 0-85802-054-8
- OCLC: 7135522

The South West Book – A Tasmanian Wilderness is a book published by the Australian Conservation Foundation in 1978 during concern following the damming of Lake Pedder in Tasmania.

It was edited by Helen Gee and Janet Fenton with assistance from Greg Hodge and artwork directed by Chris Cowles. At 308 pages, it was the most comprehensive book concerned with a region from all aspects of its kind in Australian publishing at that time.

With over 40 authors of 50 sections as well as chronology of events and bibliography the book covered industrial issues, conservation issues, as well as the development of the bureaucratic and political status of what eventually became the South West Tasmania World Heritage area.

== Publication details ==
- Gee, Helen, (joint ed.); Fenton, Janet, 1951-, (joint ed.); Australian Conservation Foundation (1978), The south west book : a Tasmanian wilderness, Australian Conservation Foundation, ISBN 978-0-85802-056-6
- Gee, Helen; Fenton, Janet, 1951-; Hodge, Greg; Australian Conservation Foundation (1983), The south-west book : a Tasmanian wilderness (New ed.), Collins; Melbourne : Australian Conservation Foundation, ISBN 978-0-00-217305-6

== See also ==
- South West Tasmania Resources Survey
