= Tony Harris =

Tony or Anthony Harris may refer to:

== Sports ==
=== American football ===
- Anthony Harris (defensive lineman) (born 1981), American football defensive lineman
- Anthony Harris (linebacker) (born 1973), American football linebacker
- Anthony Harris (safety) (born 1991), American football safety

=== Other sports ===
- Anthony Harris (cricketer) (born 1982), New Zealand cricketer
- Tony Harris (sportsman) (1916–1993), South African cricketer and rugby union international
- Tony Harris (athlete) (born 1941), Welsh middle-distance runner
- Tony Harris (basketball, born 1967) (born 1967), American basketball player
- Tony Harris (basketball, born 1970) (1970–2007), American basketball player
- Tony Harris (footballer) (John Robert Harris, 1922–2000), Scottish footballer

== Others ==
- Anthony Leonard Harris (born 1935), British geologist
- Anthony Charles Harris (1790–1869), collector of ancient Egyptian papyri
- Tony Harris (author) (born 1951), Helm Identification Guides author
- Tony Harris (artist) (born 1969), cartoonist and comic book artist
- Tony Harris (journalist) (born 1959), reporter and news anchor for Al Jazeera English and now Al Jazeera America
- Tony Harris, producer for the album Holy Water by Bad Company

== See also ==
- Toni Harris (born 1996), American football player
- Tony Harrison (disambiguation)
