= Wesley Vale pulp mill =

The Wesley Vale pulp mill was a planned kraft process pulp mill, to be built near Wesley Vale and Devonport Airport in northern Tasmania in the late 1980s. The claim that waste would have been generated by the mill and present a threat to Tasmania's World Heritage listed forests became a significant environmental and political issue at the state and federal levels and construction of the mill was eventually canceled by its foreign-owned backers Noranda and North Ltd.

== See also ==
- Woodchipping
- Papermaking
- Christine Milne, a notable opponent of the mill
