= Edmund Rouse =

Australian businessman

Edmund Alexander Rouse (1926 – 28 July 2002) was an Australian businessman and political figure. He spent three decades as the chairman of Tasmanian media company ENT, before being embroiled in a political scandal in 1989.

== Early life ==
Edmund Alexander Rouse was born in 1926.

== Career ==
Rouse was managing director of media company ENT Ltd from 1969, and was later made chairman. He established television station TNT-9 in 1962.

As chairman of logging company Gunns he offered $110,000 to Labor MP Jim Cox to cross the floor. The bribe was an attempt to prevent the Labor party forming an alliance with the Tasmanian Greens, and to secure the return of the Liberal government of Robin Gray. Cox reported the bribe to the police, and Rouse was ultimately given a three-year prison sentence. He spent 18 months in prison.

== Honours ==
In the 1988 New Year Honours, he was made a Commander of the British Empire (CBE). The honour was later rescinded.

== Personal life ==
Rouse married Dorothy Rolph, daughter of Gordon and granddaughter of newspaper proprietor William Robert Rolph (1864–1948), who was associated with the Launceston Examiner in 1897.

== Death and legacy ==
Rouse died in Melbourne on 28 July 2002.

Tasmanian journalist Stephen Tanner wrote in a 1995 article that the scandal had "undermined the tremendous contribution which Rouse had made to the Australian media industry over many years, through his involvement with the Newspaper Advertising Bureau, the Australian Press Council, the Regional Dailies Association, and the Media Council of Australia. It also undermined the major contribution Rouse had made to Tasmania over the same period".

Barbara Valentine of the University of Tasmania wrote that he was always a great champion of Tasmania.
