= 1989 Tasmanian state election =

State election in Australia

- 13 May 1989

All 35 seats to the House of Assembly 18 seats needed for a majority
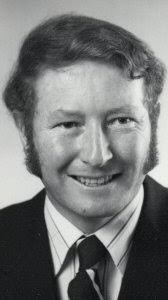

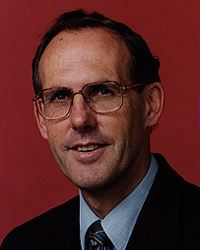
	First party	Second party	Third party
Leader	Robin Gray	Michael Field	Bob Brown
Party	Liberal	Labor	Ind. Green
Leader since	10 November 1981	14 December 1988	1983
Leader's seat	Lyons	Braddon	Denison
Last election	19 seats	14 seats	2 seats
Seats won	17	13	5
Seat change	▼2	▼1	▲3
Popular vote	128,143	94,809	46,797
Percentage	46.92%	34.71%	17.13%
Swing	▼7.28	▼0.43	▲11.58
- Results of the election
Premier before election
Robin Gray
Liberal
Resulting Premier
Michael Field
Labor

The 1989 Tasmanian state election was held on 13 May 1989 in the Australian state of Tasmania to elect 35 members of the Tasmanian House of Assembly. The election used the Hare-Clark proportional representation system — seven members were elected from each of five electorates. The quota required for election was 12.5% in each division.

The incumbent Liberal government headed by Robin Gray hoped to secure a third term in office. The Labor Party was headed by Michael Field. The independents, who each ran under the name "The Independents" and were commonly referred to as "Green independents", were informally headed by Bob Brown. The Australian Democrats contested all electorates except Braddon. Green independent candidates were run in all electorates where they previously only fielded candidates in the south.

Prior to the election the Liberals held 19 of the 35 seats in parliament. The Labor Party held 14 and there were two Green independents.

This was the last election that a Premier, in Gray, had fought a second consecutive election until 2025.

== Results ==
Party	Votes	%	+/–	Seats	+/–
Liberal	128,143	46.92	-7.28	17	▼2
Labor	94,809	34.71	-0.43	13	▼1
Ind. Green	46,797	17.13	+11.58	5	▲3
Democrats	2,451	0.90	-1.16	0	Steady
Independents	937	0.34	-2.71	0	Steady
Total	273,137	100.00	–	35	–
Valid votes	273,137	94.65			
Invalid/blank votes	15,438	5.35	-0.58		
Total votes	288,575	100.00	–		
Registered voters/turnout	310,066	93.07	-0.74		

Popular vote
Liberal	46.92%
Labor	34.71%
Democrats	0.90%
Independents	17.48%

Seats
Liberal	48.57%
Labor	37.14%
Independents	14.29%

== Distribution of votes ==
=== Primary vote by division ===
	Bass	Braddon	Denison	Franklin	Lyons
Labor Party	37.4%	29.9%	36.9%	38.3%	31.0%
Liberal Party	47.3%	57.5%	38.4%	40.1%	51.4%
Independent Greens	14.1%	11.5%	23.5%	19.7%	16.8%
Other	1.1%	1.2%	1.3%	1.8%	0.7%

=== Distribution of seats ===
Electorate	Seats won
Bass	
Braddon	
Denison	
Franklin	
Lyons	

Labor
Liberal
Ind. Green

== Aftermath ==
After the election the Liberals had lost its majority by one seat and the Green Independents gained the balance of power.

The Labor Party had suffered a minor swing against them, losing one seat in Lyons to the Greens.

The Green Independents succeeded in electing one member to every electorate. This election victory would help form the official party today known as the Tasmanian Greens. Bob Brown topped the poll in Denison and was first member elected. Their primary vote of 17.1% was a record for Green movements and the highest until the 2002 Tasmanian election.

The Liberals, determined to stay in government, tried to call a second election. Gray started a petition which attracted many signatures. Edmund Rouse attempted to bribe newly elected Labor member Jim Cox with $110,000 if he would cross the floor to support Gray instead of Field. Cox refused and reported the bribe to police. Rouse served 18 months in jail and allegations surfaced that the Liberal party was involved. A later inquiry concluded there was no evidence Gray was connected to the bribe.

Labor Party leader Michael Field formed a loose alliance with the Green Independents which became known as the Labor–Green Accord. After the alliance was formed, the Green Independents joined with Labor to vote down the Liberals' nominee for Speaker and to amend the Address-In-Reply to include a statement of no-confidence in Gray and his government. Unusually, Governor Phillip Bennett sought individual assurances from each of the independents of their support for Field, despite the passing of the statement of no confidence.

Having been defeated on the floor of the legislature, Gray resigned and Michael Field became Premier.

== See also ==
- Candidates of the 1989 Tasmanian state election
- Members of the Tasmanian House of Assembly, 1989–1992
