= Andrea Dawkins =

Australian City of Launceston Councillor

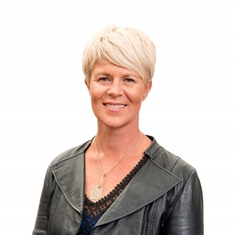

Member of the Tasmanian House of Assembly for Bass
- In office 9 June 2015 – 3 March 2018
- Preceded by: Kim Booth
- Succeeded by: Jennifer Houston

Member of Launceston City Council
- Incumbent
- Assumed office 30 October 2018
- In office 28 October 2014 – 9 June 2015

Personal details
- Born: 20 February 1965 (age 61) Launceston, Tasmania, Australia
- Party: Independent
- Other political affiliations: Greens (until 2018)
- Domestic partner: Mark Kershaw
- Children: 2
- Education: Launceston College
- Occupation: Politician, business manager, small business owner
- As of June 2023

Andrea Elizabeth Dawkins is an Australian former politician and animal welfare worker. She represented Bass in the Tasmanian House of Assembly from 9 June 2015, when she was elected in a countback to replace Kim Booth, until 3 March 2018, when she was defeated at the 2018 state election. She represented the Tasmanian Greens.

In August 2018, Dawkins announced that she would stand for deputy mayor of the City of Launceston as an independent, confirming she had ended her membership of the Greens.

Dawkins attended Launceston College, and holds a Diploma of Management. Prior to her election, Dawkins served as an alderman on Launceston City Council. She also developed and ran a social enterprise café called "Fresh on Charles" on Charles Street, Launceston from 1999 until 2013, when she sold the business. Following this, she worked in business development at Josef Chromy Wines, and later as manager of the Launceston Harvest Market.

She has two daughters with partner Mark Kershaw.

== Animal welfare ==
Dawkins is an animal welfare advocate. She is CEO of RSPCA Tasmania.
