= South West Tasmania Resources Survey =

South West Tasmania Resources Survey was a government funded and based project in Tasmania to collect and appraise information about the South West Tasmania region in a systematic manner.

The project and publications commenced in 1977, and completed in 1981

Peter Waterman, an academic geographer was the main editor and writer for the project

The papers were extensive, and covered most aspects of the resources, ecology and history of the region:

== River catchment papers ==
The South West Tasmania region was assessed by broken up into catchment areas

- Bathurst Harbour-Old River catchment
- Davey River Catchment
- Franklin Catchment
- Lower Gordon Catchment
- Huon-Weld Catchment
- King River Catchment
- Lake Gordon-Lake Pedder Catchment
- Mackintosh-Murchison Catchment
- Macquarie Harbour Catchment
- New River - South Coast Catchment
- Picton Catchment
- Wanderer-Giblin Catchment

== Archaeology ==
- Gee, Helen; Waterman, Peter, 1941-; South West Tasmania Resources Survey (1981), An archaeological and historical perspective for SW Tasmania, Steering Committee, South West Tasmania Resources Survey, ISBN 978-0-7246-1005-1
- Stockton, Jim; Waterman, Peter, 1941-; South West Tasmania Resources Survey (1977), Anthropological, archaeological and historic information for south west Tasmania, South West Tasmania Resources Survey, ISBN 978-0-7246-0583-5

== Occasional papers ==
- South West Tasmania Resources Survey (1977), Occasional paper, The Survey, ISSN 0157-2318

== See also ==
- The South West Book
