= Jim Cox (Australian politician) =

Australian politician (born 1945)

The Honourable Jim Cox AM

Launceston City Council Alderman
- Incumbent
- Assumed office 2011

Minister for Police and Emergency Management
- In office 12 February 2008 – 13 April 2010
- Premier: Paul Lennon; David Bartlett
- Preceded by: David Llewellyn
- Succeeded by: Lin Thorp

Member of the Tasmanian House of Assembly for Bass
- In office 13 May 1989 – 1 February 1992
- In office 24 February 1996 – 13 April 2010

Personal details
- Born: James Glennister Cox; 1 October 1945 (age 80) Tasmania, Australia
- Party: Independent; Labor Party
- Occupation: Radio and television presenter

James Glennister Cox AM (born 1 October 1945) is a former Tasmanian Labor politician and member of the Tasmanian House of Assembly who represented the electorate of Bass. He held office from 1989 to 1992, and again from 1996 to 2010.

Before entering Parliament, Cox co-hosted The Saturday Night Show on TNT-9 with Graeme Goodings and was a radio announcer in northern Tasmania. Cox won Logie Awards for most popular male on Tasmanian television in 1979 and 1981.

Cox ran in the 1989 Tasmanian state election. He defeated Labor incumbent Gill James and was seated in the House of Assembly.

In 1989, Tasmanian media magnate Edmund Rouse, chairman of forestry enterprise Gunns, attempted to bribe Cox with $110,000 to cross the floor of parliament in an attempt to prevent Labor forming government in alliance with the five Green Independents, and attempting to secure the return of the pro-logging Liberal Party government of Robin Gray. Cox reported the bribery attempt to police, and ultimately Rouse served 18 months in jail.

James ran against Cox again in 1992, defeating him. In 1996, Cox ran against, and defeated, Tasmanian Green Lance Armstrong. Cox was re-elected again in the 2002 and 2006 elections. He did not run in the 2010 elections and retired.

Cox was made a member of the Order of Australia in 2017. Cox was granted the title ‘Honourable’ for life by the Governor of Tasmania on 30 October 2025.

Political offices
Preceded by David Llewellyn	Minister for Police and Emergency Management; 2008–2010	Succeeded by Lin Thorp
