= Helen Gee (environmentalist) =

Australian author, editor, conservationist and environmental activist

- Born: 1950; Launceston
- Died: 2012
- Occupation: Conservationist
- Organization: The Wilderness Society
- Partner: Bob Graham

Helen Gee (1950–2012) was an Australian author, editor, conservationist and environmental activist. She was also one of the founding members of the Tasmanian Wilderness Society.

She was author and editor of two important works in relation to conservation and environment in Tasmania—The South West Book, and Fight for the forests. She had written a book for the Wilderness Society about the Franklin River and Franklin Dam. She collaborated on other works, including a number of papers for the South West Tasmania Resources Survey. She also was involved in the compilation of Tasmanian poetry in River of verse.

After her death Bob Brown gave a eulogy at a memorial event in Lindisfarne, Tasmania. Later another item from Geoff Law in Hobart appeared. A commemoration is also noted at Monument Australia.

== Publications ==
=== Books by Gee ===
- Gee, Helen; Robb, Marie; The Wilderness Society (Hobart, Tas.) (2001). For the forests : a history of the Tasmanian forest campaigns. The Wilderness Society. ISBN 978-1-875768-09-7.
- Gee, Helen; Tasmanian Wilderness Society (1978). The Franklin : Tasmania's last wild river (3rd ed.). Tasmanian Wilderness Society (published 1979). ISBN 978-0-908412-00-6.
- Summers, Ronnie; Gee, Helen (2009). Ronnie : Tasmanian songman (1st ed.). Magabala Books. ISBN 978-1-921248-10-8.

=== Papers by Gee ===
- Gee, Helen; Waterman, Peter, 1941-; South West Tasmania Resources Survey (1981). "An archaeological and historical perspective for SW Tasmania". Steering Committee, South West Tasmania Resources Survey. ISBN 978-0-7246-1005-1.
- Gee, Helen; Waterman, Peter, 1941-; South West Tasmania Resources Survey (1978). "The provision of access and recreation potential of south west Tasmania". Steering Committee, South West Tasmania Resources Survey. ISBN 978-0-7246-0567-5.

=== Books edited by Gee ===
- Gee, Helen; Fenton, Janet, 1951-; Hodge, Greg; Australian Conservation Foundation (1978). The South West Book: a Tasmanian wilderness. Australian Conservation Foundation. ISBN 978-0-85802-056-6.
- Gee, Helen; Robb, Marie (2004). River of verse : a Tasmanian journey 1800 - 2004. Back River Press. ISBN 978-0-646-44182-5.
