= Tony Harrison (lobbyist) =

Tony Harrison is a communications consultant from Tasmania who has worked in journalism, public relations, marketing, and government relations. He is a former political journalist, a former press secretary for two Tasmanian Premiers, and a former corporate affairs manager with the Australian Tourist Commission. Additionally, Harrison is a former executive chairman of Corporate Communications, the Tasmanian public relations, marketing, and government relations consulting firm. Harrison has also been involved in providing corporate advice and political lobbying services to clients in Tasmania and Australia, as well as overseeing community consultation programs for the corporate sector and the government. He is the former national president of the Public Relations Institute of Australia (PRIA), past president of the PRIA in Tasmania, and a member of the Australian Institute of Company Directors (AICD) council.

Outside of business, Harrison is a director of Cricket Australia (the former ACB) and a former chairman of Cricket Tasmania.

== Career ==
Harrison was a PRIA Tasmanian council member for approximately twelve years before serving as vice president for two, followed by four years as the PRIA Tasmanian President. He was involved in organizing two national conferences held in Tasmania and was chairman of a 1992 event in Hobart, Tasmania. Harrison was instrumental in establishing the Tasmanian Awards for Excellence in conjunction with two sister organizations, the Australian Marketing Institute and the Advertising Club of Tasmania.

In 1996, he traveled to the United Kingdom to initiate talks with the Institute of Public Relations in London about reciprocal industry activities. In 1997, he visited Singapore and Malaysia as a PRIA representative to be a keynote speaker in consecutive industry professional development seminars. He was a keynote speaker at the 1993 PRIA national convention in Sydney, the 1996 Public Relations Institute of New Zealand (PRINZ) convention in Rotorua, New Zealand, and the 1997 PRIA/PRINZ joint convention in Auckland. He also chaired the 1997 Public Relations Industry Summit in Sydney.
