= 1998 Tasmanian state election =

State election in Australia

- 29 August 1998

All 25 seats to the House of Assembly 13 seats needed for a majority

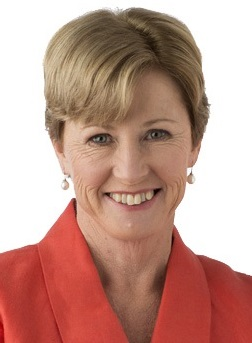
| | First party | Second party | Third party |
|---|---|---|---|
| Leader | Jim Bacon | Tony Rundle | Christine Milne |
| Party | Labor | Liberal | Greens |
| Leader since | 14 April 1997 | 18 March 1996 | 1993 |
| Leader's seat | Denison | Braddon | Lyons (lost seat) |
| Last election | 14 seats | 16 seats | 4 seats |
| Seats won | 14 | 10 | 1 |
| Seat change | Steady | ▼6 | ▼3 |
| Popular vote | 131,981 | 112,146 | 30,008 |
| Percentage | 44.79% | 38.06% | 10.18% |
| Swing | ▲4.32 | ▼3.14 | ▼0.96 |
- Results of the election
Premier before election
Tony Rundle
Liberal
Elected Premier
Jim Bacon
Labor

The 1998 Tasmanian state election was held on Saturday, 29 August 1998 in the Australian state of Tasmania to elect 25 members of the Tasmanian House of Assembly. The number of members was reduced from 35 to 25. The election used the Hare-Clark proportional representation system—five members were elected from each of five electorates. The quota required for election increased from 12.5% to 16.7%.

This election saw the end of two years of a Liberal minority government headed by Premier Tony Rundle, supported by the Tasmanian Greens. The Labor Party won government in its own right for the first time since 1979, with Jim Bacon as premier.

Labor retained all their seats despite the reduction in numbers. The Liberals lost six seats. The Greens' representation was reduced from four members to one—Peg Putt in Denison.

== Results ==
Summary of the Results of the 1998 Tasmanian state election, House of Assembly
| Party | Votes | % | +/– | Seats | +/– |
|---|---|---|---|---|---|
| Labor | 131,981 | 44.79 | ▲4.32 | 14 | Steady |
| Liberal | 112,146 | 38.06 | ▼3.14 | 10 | ▼6 |
| Greens | 30,008 | 10.18 | ▼0.96 | 1 | ▼3 |
| Tasmania First | 15,017 | 5.10 | ▲5.10 | 0 | Steady |
| Democrats | 2,627 | 0.89 | ▲0.15 | 0 | Steady |
| Democratic Socialist | 102 | 0.03 | ▲0.03 | 0 | Steady |
| Independents | 2,797 | 0.95 | ▼2.54 | 0 | ▼1 |
| Total | 294,678 | 100.00 | – | 25 | – |
| Valid votes | 294,678 | 96.09 | | | |
| Invalid/blank votes | 11,977 | 3.91 | ▼1.49 | | |
| Total votes | 306,655 | 100.00 | – | | |
| Registered voters/turnout | 322,754 | 95.01 | ▼0.97 | | |

=== Distribution of seats ===
| Electorate | Seats held |
|---|---|
| Bass | |
| Braddon | |
| Denison | |
| Franklin | |
| Lyons | |

| Labor |
| Liberal |
| Green |

== See also ==
- Candidates of the 1998 Tasmanian state election
- Members of the Tasmanian House of Assembly, 1998-2002
