= Brett Whiteley (politician) =

Australian politician (born 1960)

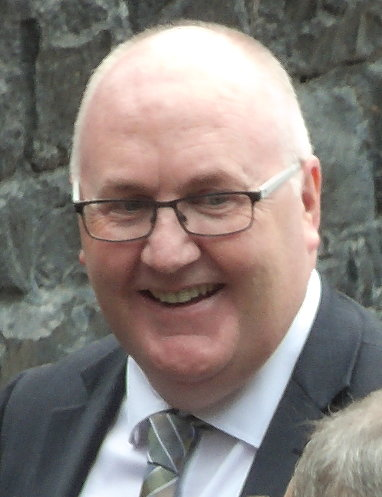
- Whiteley in 2015

Government Whip in the House of Representatives
- In office 27 September 2015 – 2 July 2016
- Prime Minister: Malcolm Turnbull
- Preceded by: Andrew Nikolic
- Succeeded by: Vacant

Member of the Australian Parliament for Braddon
- In office 7 September 2013 – 2 July 2016
- Preceded by: Sid Sidebottom
- Succeeded by: Justine Keay

Member of the Tasmanian Parliament for Braddon
- In office 20 July 2002 – 20 March 2010 Serving with Green, Rockliff, Best, Kons
- Preceded by: Bill Bonde
- Succeeded by: Adam Brooks

Personal details
- Born: Brett David Whiteley; 1 July 1960 (age 66) Burnie, Tasmania
- Party: Liberal Party
- Spouse: Sue Whiteley
- Children: 3
- Profession: Politician

Brett David Whiteley (born 1 July 1960, Burnie, Tasmania) is a former Australian politician. Whiteley was a Member of the House of Representatives representing the federal division of Braddon. He was elected at the 2013 federal election for the Liberal Party, defeating Labor's Sid Sidebottom, but was defeated after one term by Labor's Justine Keay at the 2016 federal election.

Prior to his election to federal parliament, Whiteley was a multi-Member of the Tasmanian House of Assembly representing the state electorate of Braddon from the 2002 state election until his defeat at the 2010 state election. In his first speech to state parliament, Whiteley stated that in 1993 he opened, in conjunction with two other people, a Christian training and retreat centre in Sheffield. He worked in this role for seven years. He served as an alderman for the City of Burnie from 1999 to 2002.

In November 2012, Whiteley was endorsed as the Liberal candidate for the federal seat of Braddon. He won the seat against Labor's Sid Sidebottom with a swing of 10.0 points.

Whiteley did not live in his electorate during the 2016 election campaign, but in neighbouring Lyons, at Squeaking Point near Port Sorell.

On 27 September 2015, Malcolm Turnbull, the Prime Minister of Australia, announced that Whiteley would succeed Andrew Nikolic as a Government Whip in the House of Representatives. Whiteley lost his seat at the 2016 federal election to Labor candidate Justine Keay. He was the unsuccessful Liberal candidate in the 2018 Braddon by-election.

Parliament of Australia
Preceded by Sid Sidebottom	Member for Braddon; 2013–2016	Succeeded by Justine Keay
Tasmanian House of Assembly
Preceded by Bryan Green, Tony Rundle, Brenton Best, Bill Bonde, Steve Kons	Member for Braddon; 2002–2010; Served alongside: Bryan Green, Jeremy Rockliff, Brenton Best, Steve Kons	Succeeded by Bryan Green, Jeremy Rockliff, Brenton Best, Adam Brooks, Paul O'Halloran
