= Lisa Singh =

Australian politician (born 1972)

The Honourable Lisa Singh
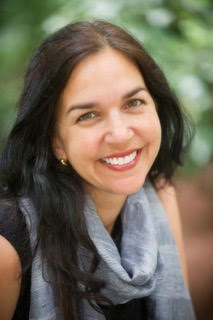

Senator for Tasmania
- In office 1 July 2011 – 30 June 2019

Minister for Corrections and Consumer Protection; of Tasmania
- In office 26 November 2008 – 13 April 2010

Minister for Workplace Relations; of Tasmania
- In office 26 November 2008 – 13 April 2010

Member of the Tasmanian House of Assembly for Denison
- In office 18 March 2006 – 13 April 2010

Personal details
- Born: Lisa Maria Singh; 20 February 1972 (age 54) Hobart, Tasmania, Australia
- Party: Labor
- Relations: Raman Pratap Singh (uncle), Ram Jati Singh (grandfather)
- Children: 2
- Education: University of Tasmania; Macquarie University

Lisa Maria Singh (born 20 February 1972) is an Australian former politician. She was a Senator for Tasmania from 2011 to 2019. She had previously been a member of the Tasmanian House of Assembly, representing the division of Denison from 2006 to 2010. The granddaughter of an Indo-Fijian member of the Parliament of Fiji, Singh was Australia's first female federal parliamentarian of Indian descent.

After leaving politics she worked as Head of Government Advocacy for Walk Free, an international human rights organisation. She is currently the Director and CEO of the Australia India Institute, the University of Melbourne's centre dedicated to promoting support for and understanding of the bilateral relationship.

== Early life and family ==
Singh was born in 1972, in Hobart, Tasmania, to a Fijian-Indian father and an English-Australian mother. Her father arrived in Australia as an international student in 1963. She attended St Mary's College, Elizabeth College, and the University of Tasmania, graduating with a Bachelor of Arts with Honours in Social Geography. She completed a Master of International Relations from Sydney's Macquarie University.

Singh is the granddaughter of Ram Jati Singh, a member of the Legislative Council of Fiji in the 1960s. Her uncle, Raman Pratap Singh, was a Fijian politician and a past President of the National Federation Party and was a Member of Parliament from 1994 to 1999.

== Early career ==
Singh worked in public relations and for the Australian Education Union as an industrial organiser.

From 1999 to 2001, Singh was an adviser to Senator Sue Mackay. Singh then became the Director of the Tasmanian Working Women's Centre, where she campaigned for paid parental leave and equal pay. She was a member of Emily's List, and served on its National Executive in Australia.

Singh became Hobart Citizen of the Year in 2004 for her work in the peace movement at the time of the Iraq war, especially in highlighting the plight of women and children in war.

Singh has also served as the President of the YWCA Tasmania, the President of the United Nations Association Tasmania and as a member of the Tasmania Women's Council. She was convenor of the Australian Republican Movement from 2004 to 2007. She was manager of the Tasmanian Government arts unit, arts@work, before being pre-selected by the Australian Labor Party for a House of Assembly seat.

== Election to Tasmanian Parliament ==
Singh was elected to the House of Assembly at the 2006 state election, as the member for Denison. In August 2007, she abstained from voting on a controversial bill supporting Gunns' Bell Bay Pulp Mill, after having failed in an appeal to then-Premier Paul Lennon for a free vote on the matter.

Singh firstly became a parliamentary secretary in 2008. The she entered Cabinet as Minister for Corrections and Consumer Protection, Minister for Workplace Relations, and Minister Assisting the Premier on Climate Change. She was sworn in at a ceremony at Government House on 26 November 2008. As minister, Singh introduced legislative reforms in workers compensation, corrections, climate change and asbestos management.

Singh was defeated at the 2010 state election. Following that, she co-founded the Asbestos Free Tasmania Foundation, an advocacy group to highlight the dangers of asbestos and support sufferers of asbestos-related disease, and became its first CEO.

== Election to Australian Parliament ==
Singh was elected to the Australian Senate in the August 2010 federal election, making her the first person of South Asian descent to be elected to the Australian Parliament. On 18 October 2013, she was promoted to the position of shadow parliamentary secretary to the shadow Attorney-General. On 24 June 2014, the federal Labor leader, Bill Shorten, promoted her to the position of shadow parliamentary secretary for the Environment, Climate Change and Water.

In 2016, twelve senators were to be elected due to the double dissolution election, Singh's sixth position on the ticket was described in some media reports as "unwinnable". Following a campaign to vote for Singh "below the line" on the ballot paper, she received 20,741 votes, 80% of a quota, which was enough to overturn the party's ticket order and she was elected as the 10th senator elected for Tasmania. She was the first Australian senator to win election over a high-ranked candidate on the same ticket since Bill Aylett in 1953, who was also a Tasmanian ALP senator.

Singh was defeated at the 2019 federal election after being again placed in the "unwinnable" fourth position on Labor's Tasmanian Senate ticket. Once again there was a campaign for people to support her by voting below the line. She polled 5.9% of the vote, or 0.4 quotas, only slightly fewer than her vote in 2016, but that was not enough, given the higher quota required at a half-Senate election.

== Policy positions and achievements ==
Singh's parliamentary career and advocacy focused on the promotion and protection of human rights, foreign affairs, trade and international development, multiculturalism and refugees, the environment and climate change, governance and access to justice. She has been a strong advocate for building the Australia-India relationship. In 2014, the President of India awarded her one of India's highest civilian awards, the Pravasi Bharatiya Samman, for her exceptional and meritorious public service as a person of Indian heritage in fostering friendly relations between India and Australia.

In 2016, Singh represented Australia at the United Nations General Assembly, New York, as a parliamentary delegate of the Australian mission to the United Nations.

Singh has been a vocal opponent of Australia's offshore detention of asylum seekers. She broke with the Labor Party's official position to call for an end to indefinite offshore detention on the ABC TV Q&A program.

Tasmanian House of Assembly
Preceded by David Bartlett; Michael Hodgman; Judy Jackson; Peg Putt; Graeme Sturges	Member for Denison; 2006–2010; Served alongside: David Bartlett, Graeme Sturges, Michael Hodgman, Peg Putt	Succeeded by Cassy O'Connor; David Bartlett; Matthew Groom; Scott Bacon; Elise Archer
Political offices
Preceded by David Llewellyn	Minister for Corrections and Consumer Protection (Tasmania); 2008–2010	Succeeded by Nick McKim
Preceded by Allison Ritchie	Minister for Workplace Relations (Tasmania); 2008–2010	Succeeded by David O'Byrne
