= Jeremy Ball =

Australian politician and actor (1968–2014)

- Born: Jeremy Ball; 10 August 1968; Wonthaggi, Victoria, Australia
- Died: 15 September 2014 (aged 46); Carrick, Tasmania, Australia

Jeremy Dacre Ball (10 August 1968 – 15 September 2014) was an Australian politician, actor and activist. Ball served as the deputy mayor of Launceston, Tasmania's second-largest city, from 2011 until his death in 2014 due to a car accident.

He was a member of the Tasmanian Greens, the state chapter of the Australian Greens.

Ball also worked as a professional actor during the late 1990s. He was best known for his portrayal of Warren Harvey in the 1997 ABC television series, Fallen Angels, as well as a small role as a businessman in The Matrix in 1999.

== Life ==
Ball was born in Wonthaggi, Victoria, in 1968, the third son of general practitioner John Jennings Ball, head of a landed gentry family of Veryan, Cornwall, and Caroline, daughter of Ivor Cresswell Wellsford Bayldon, OBE, of Tanzania. He received a Bachelor of Dramatic Art degree from the National Institute of Dramatic Art in 1995. He played Warren Harvey in the ABC series, Fallen Angels in 1997. Ball was also cast in the 1999 action film, The Matrix, which was filmed on location in Sydney. In his scene, Ball plays a businessman talking on his cell phone. Neo, played by Keanu Reeves, grabs and steals Ball's phone while being chased through the city streets by Agent Smith, played by Hugo Weaving.

He returned to his native Launceston in 2002 after years of living outside of Australia. Ball entered politics and activism, and gained a Diploma of Business from NDA Tasmania. He ran as a candidate for several federal, state and council elections for the Tasmanian Greens. In 2007, Ball was elected as an alderman to the Launceston City Council. He became known as an advocate for the city's migrant community. He also sought to preserve Launceston's historic architecture, as well as the city's Cataract Gorge. Ball became the Deputy Mayor of Launceston in 2011, a position he held until his death in 2014.

== Accident ==
Ball was killed in a head-on car accident on the Bass Highway near Carrick, Tasmania, shortly before 1:00 p.m. on 15 September 2014, at the age of 45. Ball's four-wheel drive vehicle crossed the highway and collided head-on with a log truck traveling in the opposite direction. He was survived by his wife, Karina, and their sons, Griffin and Jasper. Launceston mayor Albert Van Zetten, Premier of Tasmania Will Hodgman, and Tasmanian Greens leader Kim Booth paid tribute to Jeremy Ball, while the Parliament of Tasmania observed a moment of silence in his memory. Hundreds of people attended his funeral, which was held at Albert Hall in Launceston.

== Filmography ==
| Year | Title | Role | Notes |
|---|---|---|---|
| 1995 | Equal Impact | NKKA Class | |
| 1999 | The Matrix | Businessman | |
