= Graeme Sturges =

Australian politician

Graeme Sturges MP

Minister for Infrastructure
- In office 26 May 2008 – 13 April 2010
- Premier: David Bartlett
- Preceded by: Paul Lennon
- Succeeded by: Lara Giddings

Member of the Tasmanian House of Assembly for Denison
- In office 20 July 2002 – 13 April 2010
- In office 26 May 2011 – 15 March 2014
- Preceded by: David Bartlett

Personal details
- Born: 31 May 1955 (age 71) Hobart, Tasmania, Australia
- Party: Labor Party

Graeme Lindsay Sturges (born 31 May 1955) is an Australian politician. He was a Labor Party member of the Tasmanian House of Assembly from 2002 to 2010 and 2011 to 2014, representing the Hobart-based electorate of Denison. He was elected twice before losing his seat in 2010, regained it in a countback following the resignation of David Bartlett in 2011, and retired at the 2014 election. He was the state Minister for Infrastructure from 2008 until 2010.

== Early life ==
Sturges was born in Hobart. Prior to entering Parliament, he worked as the State Secretary for the Tasmanian branch of the Communications, Electrical & Plumbing Union.

== Political career ==
Sturges entered Parliament when he was elected to the seat of Denison at the 2002 state election.

Sturges retained his political seat in the 2006 state election and continued his role as Government Whip whilst also remaining involved in community groups such as the RSPCA Australia, Disabled Riders Association, Pensioners Union, French Car Club of Tasmania and the boxing community.

Sturges was appointed the Minister for Infrastructure in David Bartlett's cabinet following the resignation of Premier, Paul Lennon.

During his time as Minister, Sturges attracted vigorous comment as to his handling of both rail infrastructure and ports as services either failed or were proven to have significant deterioration due to inactivity over many years. The absence of available Federal stimulus funding to alleviate these issues was also commented upon with Sturges admitting that the government had failed to apply for financial support.

During his time in parliament, Sturges was reported to have made several gaffes. In March 2009, he was accused of misusing his position by raising an incident between his son and a bus driver with the management of Metro Tasmania. In another widely reported incident, Sturges reportedly shouted at a Spirit of Tasmania security guard, stating "Don't you know who I am? I'll have your job." Sturges apologised to the guard, but later denied he had made the statements attributed to him, and said that his apology had been forced by the premier's media advisors.

Sturges subsequently lost his seat in the Tasmanian state election in March 2010 gaining only 1,185 primary votes. He was then appointed chairman of TasBuild.

In May 2011, former Premier David Bartlett resigned from parliament, triggering a "countback" (or recount of 2010 votes) for Denison. Of Labor's unsuccessful candidates at that election, Lisa Singh had been elected to the Australian Senate, leaving Sturges and Madeleine Ogilvie as the eligible Labor candidates. The recount took place on 26 May, and Sturges was re-elected with 5,362 votes to Ogilvie's 4,197.

Political offices
Preceded by Paul Lennon	Minister for Infrastructure; 2008–2010	Succeeded by Lara Giddings
