= Daniel Hulme =

Australian politician

Cr Daniel Hulme

Councillor of the City of Clarence
- Incumbent
- Assumed office October 2018

Member of the Tasmanian House of Assembly for Franklin
- In office February 2009 – March 2010
- Preceded by: Paula Wriedt

Personal details
- Born: Daniel Christopher Hulme; 7 October 1979 (age 47) Melbourne, Australia
- Party: Labor

Daniel Christopher Hulme (born 7 October 1979, Melbourne) is an Australian politician currently serving as a Clarence City Councillor. He was a Labor Party member of the Tasmanian House of Assembly from 2009 to 2010 for the electorate of Franklin.

== Education and Pre-Parliamentary Career ==
Prior to entering Parliament, Hulme worked as an electorate officer for Premier Paul Lennon, then for Labor Senator Catryna Bilyk. He has also worked for the Australian Taxation Office and the Australian Computer Society.

Hulme graduated from the University of Tasmania with a Bachelor of Computing in 2000, a Bachelor of Computing with Honours in 2001 and a Master of Business Administration in 2008. Hulme was President of the University of Tasmania Student Association (a former student union separate from TUSA) in 2002 and 2003.

== Political career ==
Hulme entered State parliament on a recount in February 2009 after Paula Wriedt resigned due to ill health. He received 620 primary votes at the 2006 State Election, finishing 11th in a field of 18, but received 8,097 out of 10,660 or 78.0% of votes in the recount. He was defeated in 2010.

Hulme spoke strongly in support of the Tasmanian forest industry and the Regional Forest Agreement at the Timber Communities Australia (TCA) state conference, 4 July 2009. In his speech, he strongly criticised Bob Brown, The Wilderness Society and the Greens. He also said he became a TCA member.

Hulme was elected to Clarence City Council in 2014, and was re-elected in 2018 and 2022.
