= Steve Kons =

Australian politician

Alderman Steve Kons

Deputy Premier of Tasmania
- In office 30 October 2006 – 9 April 2008
- Premier: Paul Lennon
- Preceded by: Bryan Green
- Succeeded by: David Bartlett

Member of the Tasmanian House of Assembly for Braddon
- In office 29 August 1998 – 20 March 2010

Personal details
- Born: 17 September 1962 (age 64) Melbourne, Victoria, Australia
- Party: Labor Party
- Education: University of Tasmania
- Profession: Lawyer

Steven Kons (born 17 September 1962) is an Australian politician. He was a Labor Party member of the Tasmanian House of Assembly from 1998 until 2010, representing the electorate of Braddon. He served as Deputy Premier under Paul Lennon from 2006 to 2008, and also served as Attorney-General, Minister for Justice and Workplace Relations and Minister for Planning. He retired from state politics in 2010, and was elected Mayor of Burnie in 2011 and 2018. He previously served as Mayor of Burnie from 1997 to 1999.

Kons was born in Melbourne to Greek immigrants who worked in heavy manual employment to help educate him at Caulfield Grammar School. After the family moved to operate a Devonport business, he graduated with a Bachelor of Laws degree from the University of Tasmania before returning to Melbourne to practice mainly in the corporate sector. Kons later returned to Tasmania and established a successful business career. From 1997 to 1999, he served as Mayor of Burnie.

He was invited to run for the Labor Party at the 1998 state election by then Labor leader Jim Bacon, and was elected second overall, topping the Labor slate. He was appointed Parliamentary Secretary to the Premier, promoted to Secretary to Cabinet, and then to Cabinet as Minister for Primary Industries and Water. He was again promoted to Attorney-General and Minister for Justice, Planning and Workplace Relations following the 2006 state election. On 27 October 2006, he was appointed Deputy Premier, replacing Bryan Green.

Kons resigned as Deputy Premier in April 2008 after admitting that he had made "inaccurate statements" to parliament regarding the appointment of a magistrate. He announced in July 2009 that he would retire at the 2010 election. He has since been an alderman of Burnie City Council, also serving as mayor in 2011-2014 and from 2018.

== See also ==
- List of Caulfield Grammar School people
