= Paula Wriedt =

Australian politician

Paula Catherine Wriedt

Mayor of Kingbourough
- Incumbent
- Assumed office 21 July 2021
- Preceded by: Dean Winter

Member of the Tasmanian Parliament for Franklin
- In office 24 February 1996 – 18 January 2009

Personal details
- Born: 11 December 1968 (age 57) Hobart, Tasmania, Australia
- Party: Labor Party
- Spouse: Dale Rahmanovic (divorced)
- Children: 2

Paula Catherine Wriedt (born 11 December 1968, Hobart) is an Australian former politician. She was a Labor Party member of the Tasmanian House of Assembly, representing the outer suburban Hobart seat of Franklin. She was first elected to parliament in the 1996 election. Wriedt is the daughter of former state Labor leader and Whitlam Government Minister for Agriculture Ken Wriedt.

== Political career ==
Wriedt was appointed Minister for Education in 1998, becoming the youngest ever female member of Cabinet in Tasmania. As Education Minister, in December 2000, she launched "Learning Together", a major policy on education, training and information provision for the state of Tasmania. Learning Together promised a complete overhaul of the state's education system, introducing the Essential Learnings Curriculum as a trial way to assess and teach students. Wriedt also funded the establishment of a number of child care centres co-located with government primary schools, and saw the raising of Tasmania's school leaving age from 16 to 17 years. She also banned the use of corporal punishment in all schools and introduced reforms to enhance the education of children with disability in mainstream schools.

In 2002 she also became Minister for Women. In 2005, Wriedt initiated the Tasmanian Honour Roll of Women to recognise the significant contribution that women have made to Tasmania throughout history.

In the 2006 Tasmanian state election Wriedt suffered a decline in her primary vote, almost losing her seat to Liberal challenger Vanessa Goodwin, after criticism of the government over the Essential Learnings Curriculum. After the election, she became Minister for Tourism, Arts and the Environment, while David Bartlett assumed her Education portfolio. Following a cabinet reshuffle in January 2008, Wriedt was appointed Minister for Economic Development and Tourism.

Wriedt was the subject of a "lewd" remark made by Sam Newman on the Nine Network's AFL Footy Show on 31 July 2008. Wriedt appeared on the show to announce a A$4 million sponsorship deal for a Tasmanian AFL team bid. Wriedt described the remark as "stupid and inappropriate", and Newman apologised the following day.

On 4 August 2008, Wriedt was admitted to hospital after an apparent suicide attempt. Premier David Bartlett announced that she would require a period of treatment and recuperation, and that he would be temporarily handling Wriedt's ministerial duties. Wriedt later released a statement acknowledging that she had been suffering from depression following the breakdown of her marriage to Dale Rahmanovic in February 2008.

On 12 September 2008 Premier Bartlett asked the Governor of Tasmania Peter Underwood to withdraw Wriedt's commission, ending her appointment as a minister. She resigned from the Tasmanian parliament on 18 January 2009, citing her ongoing battle with depression.

== Post-parliamentary career ==
Wriedt was appointed the inaugural Chief Executive Officer of Cystic Fibrosis Tasmania in 2010 and as of May 2026 continues to serve in the role.

She was elected to Kingborough Council in November 2011, topping the poll. Then in November 2014 she commenced a four-year term as Deputy Mayor but was not re-elected at the end of her term. In July 2021, she was elected Mayor in a by-election following the resignation of Dean Winter upon his election to state parliament. She was elected to a full term in October 2022 but opted not to run for re-election in 2026 due to "toxic behaviour" from other councillors and "nasty" social media comments.

On 8 March 2017, during an International Women's Day panel discussion on ABC Local Radio, Wriedt clarified that she was not a member of any political party, saying that after she retired from Parliament in 2009 she “did not receive a membership renewal form from the ALP, which I took as a message that I was no longer welcome”. She also mentioned that her more enduring friendships from her days in politics were “more from her former opposition colleagues”.
