= Rene Hidding =

Australian politician

The Honourable Rene Hidding

Leader of the Opposition in Tasmania Elections: 2006
- In office 6 August 2002 – 30 March 2006
- Deputy: Will Hodgman
- Preceded by: Bob Cheek
- Succeeded by: Will Hodgman

Member of the Tasmanian House of Assembly for Lyons
- In office 24 February 1996 – 25 February 2019
- Succeeded by: John Tucker

Personal details
- Born: Marinus Theodoor Hidding; 5 February 1953 (age 73) Hengelo, Netherlands
- Party: Liberal Party
- Occupation: Politician

Marinus Theodoor "Rene" Hidding (born 5 February 1953) is an Australian politician. He was a Liberal Party member for the Division of Lyons in the Tasmanian House of Assembly from 1996 until his resignation in 2019. From 2002 until 2006, he was also leader of the Liberal Party and Leader of the Opposition in Tasmania.

== Upbringing and early career ==
Hidding immigrated to Tasmania from the Netherlands in his youth. He was educated in Launceston at Riverside High School and Launceston Matriculation College where he gained an Associate Diploma Business (Real Estate). He was a self-employed businessman (his companies included Hidding Trading Pty Ltd, Hiddings Mitre 10, Hiddings Building Services, Span Truss Systems and Hiddings Joinery) before entering politics, when he sold his business to Gunns Limited.

== Political career ==
Hidding was an Alderman on the Launceston City Council from 1985 to 1992. He was an unsuccessful Liberal candidate for the Australian House of Representatives seat of Lyons in 1993.

In 1996, Hidding was elected to the Tasmanian House of Assembly for the multi-member seat of Lyons. Between 1996 and 1998 Hidding held junior positions in the government of Tony Rundle, including Secretary to Cabinet, Deputy Chairman of Committees and a member of the Cabinet Budget Committee.

After the Liberals lost office, Hidding was elected to the Opposition front bench as Deputy Opposition Leader in 1999, and in August 2002 he was elected Leader of the Opposition. He was also Shadow Minister for Tourism, Parks and Heritage and Shadow Minister for Resources and Energy.

At the 18 March 2006 state election, Hidding failed to defeat the incumbent Labor Party government led by Paul Lennon. Despite an increase in the Liberal Party's primary vote, the Opposition failed to make any gains in terms of seats. On election night, Hidding declined to speculate on whether he would continue as opposition leader. Twelve days later, on 30 March, the day that final election results were known, Will Hodgman was unanimously elected by the party as its new leader.

On 4 May 2018, following the election of the Liberal Government, Hidding was appointed as Parliamentary Secretary to Premier Will Hodgman.

Hidding resigned from parliament on 25 February 2019, following allegations of historic sexual abuse against a minor, published in The Australian. Hidding denied the allegations and said he would confront them as a private citizen. In September 2019, the police announced that Hidding would not be charged over the allegations, with the Director of Public Prosecutions determining that "given the constraints posed by the passage of time and the resulting impact on the evidence available, there was no reasonable prospect of conviction".

== Personal life ==
Rene Hidding and his wife, Shirley, have four adult children, and several grandchildren.

Political offices
| Preceded by Bob Cheek | Opposition Leader of Tasmania; 2002–2006 | Succeeded by Will Hodgman |
| Preceded by David O'Byrne | Minister for Police and Emergency Management; 2014–2018 | Succeeded by Michael Ferguson |
| Preceded by David O'Byrne | Minister for Infrastructure; 2014–2018 | Succeeded by Jeremy Rockliff |
Party political offices
| Preceded by Bob Cheek | Leader of the Liberal Party in Tasmania; 2002–2006 | Succeeded by Will Hodgman |
