= Sue Napier =

Australian politician

The Honourable Sue Napier

Tasmanian Leader of the Opposition
- In office 2 July 1999 – 20 August 2001
- Premier: Jim Bacon
- Preceded by: Tony Rundle
- Succeeded by: Bob Cheek

Deputy Premier of Tasmania
- In office 18 March 1996 – 14 September 1998
- Premier: Tony Rundle
- Preceded by: John Beswick
- Succeeded by: Paul Lennon

Member of the Tasmanian House of Assembly
- In office 1 February 1992 – 20 March 2010
- Preceded by: Neil Robson
- Succeeded by: Michael Ferguson
- Constituency: Bass

Personal details
- Born: Suzanne Deidre Braid; 1 January 1948 Latrobe, Tasmania, Australia
- Died: 5 August 2010 (aged 62) Launceston, Tasmania, Australia
- Party: Liberal Party
- Spouse: Drew Napier
- Relations: Harry Braid (father)
- Education: University of Tasmania (BA Hons); University of Leeds (MA)
- Occupation: Teacher

Suzanne Deidre Napier (née Braid; 1 January 1948 – 5 August 2010) was an Australian politician. She was a member of the Tasmanian House of Assembly for the Division of Bass. Napier was first elected in 1992 and was re-elected in 1996, 1998, 2002 and 2006.

She was born on New Years Day, 1948, in Latrobe, Tasmania, the daughter of Tasmanian Legislative Council member Harry Braid.

She was leader of the Liberal Party from 2 July 1999 until 20 August 2001. She became the leader of the opposition when former Premier Tony Rundle resigned and she defeated leadership aspirant Bob Cheek in a party room ballot. Cheek successfully challenged Napier's leadership two years later. She was the first woman to lead the Tasmanian Liberals and the first woman to lead any major political party in Tasmania.

During her career Napier served in many portfolios including transport, youth affairs, education and opposition portfolios of business, tourism, health and infrastructure as well as Deputy Premier.

Napier was diagnosed with breast cancer in late 2008, but responded well to treatment and recovered in 2009. In February 2010, she announced that she would retire from parliament and not contest the 2010 Tasmanian election after it was discovered that the cancer had returned.

She died from breast cancer on 5 August 2010, aged 62.

Political offices
| Preceded by John Beswick | Deputy Premier of Tasmania; 1996–1998 | Succeeded by Paul Lennon |
| Preceded by Tony Rundle | Opposition Leader of Tasmania; 1999–2001 | Succeeded by Bob Cheek |
Party political offices
| Preceded by Tony Rundle | Leader of the Liberal Party in Tasmania; 1999–2001 | Succeeded by Bob Cheek |
