= Tim Morris =

Australian politician (born 1955)

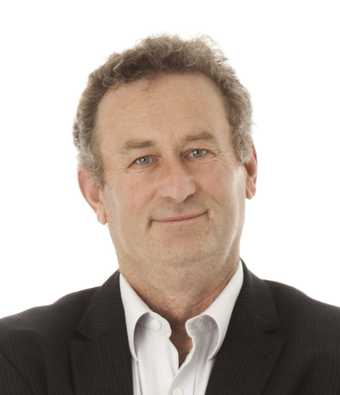

Deputy Speaker of Tasmania

Member of the Tasmanian House of Assembly for Lyons
- In office 20 July 2002 – 15 March 2014

Personal details
- Born: 10 January 1955 (age 71) Alexandra, Victoria, Australia
- Party: Tasmanian Greens
- Occupation: Labourer

Timothy Bryce Morris (born 10 January 1955) is a former Australian politician.

== Early life ==
Morris grew up on a farm in Alexandra in central Victoria with his mother. During his high school years, he moved to the city to live with his father. He left school at age 15 and worked as a builders' labourer.

He holidayed to Tasmania, and has lived in the Derwent Valley since 1976, working first as a farming labourer. He was then the owner/manager of a holiday lodge.

== Political career ==
In 1989, Morris was elected to the New Norfolk Council (now Derwent Valley Council) and later became mayor. During that time, he oversaw the purchase of the Royal Derwent Hospital and Willow Court from the state government. He retired from the council and mayorship in 2000.

Morris was first elected as a Tasmanian Greens member of the Tasmanian House of Assembly at the 2002 election, representing the Lyons electorate. He was re-elected in the 2006 election, receiving 10.5% of first preferences, an increase compared to his previous vote of 9.1% in the 2002 election.

At the 2010 election Morris received the highest number of first preference votes in the division of Lyons with 14.1% of the vote. After the election, Morris was elected by Parliament to the position of Deputy Speaker and Chair of Committees. He was also named as deputy leader of the Tasmanian Greens.

He was not re-elected at the 2014 House of Assembly elections.
