= Peg Putt =

Australian politician

Peg Putt AM
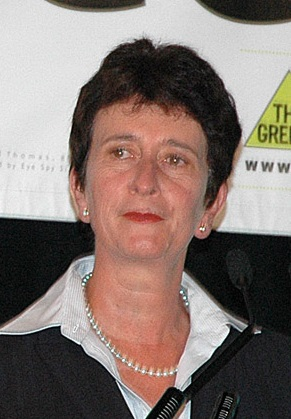

Member of the Tasmanian House of Assembly for Denison
- In office 2 March 1993 – 7 July 2008
- Constituency: Denison

Personal details
- Born: 5 June 1953 (age 73) Sydney
- Party: Greens
- Education: University of Sussex

Margaret Ann Putt (born 5 June 1953) is a former Australian politician and parliamentary leader of the Tasmanian Greens.

== Early life ==
Putt was born in Sydney and attended school at Hornsby High School. At the age of 16, she won a scholarship to the Australian International Independent School in Epping. At this time, Putt was also part of organising High School Students against Vietnam. She then travelled to the United Kingdom where she studied a Bachelor of Arts, majoring in international relations, at the University of Sussex, graduating with Honours.

After completing her degree, Putt travelled back to Australia through Asia, and in 1975 got a job developing pollution control programs at Botany, at a time when the NSW Environment Protection Agency had just been set up. In the late 1970s Putt moved up to Nimbin, and camped at a commune. She later moved to the Northern Territory to work with Aboriginal communities on Elcho Island in Arnhem land. She then moved to live on Dangar Island in the Hawkesbury, NSW.

She moved to Tasmania in 1986 with her partner and two daughters, where she became spokesperson for the Huon Protection Group which succeeded in stopping development of a new woodchip mill on the Huon River. She also founded the Tasmanian Threatened Species Network and was director of the Tasmanian Conservation Trust.

== Political career ==
In 1992, Bob Brown asked Peg to be a support candidate for the Green Independents at the impending state election after the first Labor-Green accord collapsed. Putt entered the Tasmanian House of Assembly in 1993 after Bob Brown resigned and votes in the Hobart electorate of Denison were recounted. The 1996 state election gave the Greens the balance of power and Putt was one of four Greens to be in parliament during the period of balance of power. In 1998 the Labor and Liberal parties restructured the Tasmanian Parliament, reducing the number of House of Assembly members from 35 to 25. In the 1998 state election, called one week after the restructure, she was the only one out of four Greens to retain a seat and became leader as a result. Four years later in the 2002 election she recorded the second highest vote of 12,036 (20.0%) after Tasmanian premier Jim Bacon and became one of four Greens elected. In doing so, she outpolled the leader of the Liberal Party, Bob Cheek, in their electorate of Denison. Putt became the Greens parliamentary leader.

Putt was re-elected in the 2006 election, receiving 18.4% of first preferences, a decrease compared to her previous result, but the highest of any Denison candidate. On 7 July 2008, Putt announced her retirement as leader of the Tasmanian Greens, and as a Member of the House of Assembly. She was replaced as Greens leader by the party's deputy leader, Nick McKim.

== After politics ==
After her resignation, Putt left the state and has since returned to focus on international work, representing the Wilderness Society at UN climate change and forest negotiations. In 2012, Putt was appointed CEO of anti-logging group Markets for Change and has since publicly criticised the Wilderness Society.

In 2011, Putt was placed on the Tasmanian Honour Roll of Women for her environmental advocacy.

In the 2025 Australia Day Honours, Putt was made a Member of the Order of Australia for significant service to conservation and the environment, and to the Parliament of Tasmania.

Party political offices
Preceded by Christine Milne	Leader of the Tasmanian Greens; 1998–2008	Succeeded by Nick McKim
