= 2006 Tasmanian state election =

State election in Australia

- 18 March 2006

All 25 seats to the House of Assembly 13 seats needed for a majority

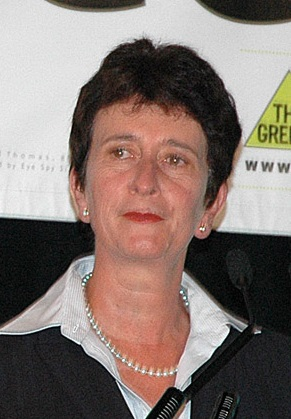
	First party	Second party	Third party
Leader	Paul Lennon	Rene Hidding	Peg Putt
Party	Labor	Liberal	Greens
Leader since	21 March 2004	6 August 2002	29 August 1998
Leader's seat	Franklin	Lyons	Denison
Last election	14 seats	7 seats	4 seats
Seats won	14 seats	7 seats	4 seats
Seat change	Steady	Steady	Steady
Popular vote	152,544	98,511	51,501
Percentage	49.27%	31.82%	16.63%
Swing	▼2.61	▲4.43	▼1.50
- Results of the election
Premier before election
Paul Lennon
Labor
Elected Premier
Paul Lennon
Labor

An election for the House of Assembly (lower house) was held in the Australian state of Tasmania on 18 March 2006, the same day as the South Australian elections. The Labor Party led by Premier Paul Lennon, won a third successive majority government term in office, despite predictions the election would result in a minority government. Although there was a small swing against Labor, they finished with 14 seats, and there were no changes in the party composition of the assembly. The Liberal Party led by Rene Hidding gained a small swing and finished with seven seats. The Tasmanian Greens led by Peg Putt suffered a small swing and finished with four seats; meaning no change in seat representation since the last election. Had the Greens lost one of their four seats, they would have lost their status as a major party and would lose financial resources, offices and support staff.

Minor parties such as the Australian Democrats and the Family First Party did not contest the election. The Tasmania First Party, the Socialist Alliance and the Christian Democratic Party (who stood as grouped independents) polled poorly. A total of 95 candidates (65 men and 30 women) nominated for election: 27 from Labor, 25 from the Liberals and Greens, four from Tasmania First, two from Socialist Alliance and 12 independents.

This was the first time Paul Lennon had run for election as Premier, after the resignation of Tasmanian Labor leader Jim Bacon in 2004 due to lung cancer. On the day the election results were finalised, the Liberals installed Will Hodgman as their new leader and Jeremy Rockliff as deputy leader. Hodgman said the Liberals were disappointed with their result.

== Campaign ==
The Liberals pledged that it would only accept government if it won a majority. Labor said it would be prepared to work with the Tasmanian Greens to form government if necessary, but ruled out a formal coalition and campaigned to be returned in majority. Commentators said that fear of a minority government was a factor in the government's strong showing, which appears to have resulted from a swing to Labor in the last week of the campaign.

Lennon refused to participate in an ABC television debate if the Greens leader Putt was to be involved. Hidding was also not in favour of Putt's involvement but said he would participate if Lennon did. As a result, the ABC cancelled the debate, saying that Putt should not be excluded.

The Federal Labor member for Franklin, Harry Quick, caused a stir for his endorsement of Greens candidate Nick McKim. In a Greens election pamphlet, Quick commended McKim on his "hard work over the last four years."

Members of the secretive Christian group known as Exclusive Brethren were found to be behind newspaper advertisements and distributed flyers attacking Greens policies.

A group identifying themselves as Tasmanians for a Better Future placed television and newspaper advertisements calling for a "stable majority government". Late in the campaign period, businessman Michael Kent revealed himself as one of the backers of the group.

=== Australian Labor Party ===
Labor tried to convince the public of their economic achievements. Since the Labor government came to power, Labor said, employment and property value had risen and the state debt had been greatly reduced. Labor attributed this economic success to their stable and strong leadership. Others including federal Treasurer Peter Costello claimed that it was the GST revenue and the Liberal federal government's economic policies that have caused Tasmania's economy to grow. Labor also claimed that under their government the number of tourists visiting the state had risen. They attributed this to a marketing campaign and the purchase of the three Spirit of Tasmania ferries. Others claimed that the increase in tourists had been caused by cheaper air-fares from operators such as Jetstar and Virgin Blue.

Premier Paul Lennon warned voters about electing a minority government. On the final day of the campaign at a childcare centre, Lennon argued that a minority government would jeopardise the future of the state's children, and said that Tasmanians should move forward under a majority Labor Government. Lennon also raised the spectre of small businesses failing under a hung Parliament.

=== Liberal Party ===
The Liberals campaign slogan was "Getting it right for all Tasmanians." Much of their campaign was focused on criticising the Labor government, including over the long waiting lists in Tasmania's Royal Hobart Hospital, long dental waiting lists, and the number of young people leaving Tasmania. They also heavily criticised the conduct of Lennon, using the slogan "special deals for special mates." This criticism related to the resignation payment of $650,000 to former Governor Richard Butler, Lennon accepting an upgrade at the Melbourne Crown Casino owned by PBL and then signing a licence to PBL to operate an online betting exchange, and other matters.

The Liberals also warned of a possible minority government between Labor and the Greens, claiming it would be a disaster for Tasmania: this campaign may have backfired on the Liberals by encouraging voters to support a majority Labor government. The Liberals abandoned their 1998 commitment to sell Hydro Tasmania. On the issue of health Hidding promised to resign if he did not cut waiting lists by 20% in one year. The Liberals also promised to abolish Land Tax.

On the final day of the campaign, the Liberals criticised the Government for funding an additional $166 million to pay for its election promises, saying the money should be used for the troubled Royal Hobart Hospital.

=== Tasmanian Greens ===
The Tasmanian Greens' campaign slogan was "This Time Vote Green". Before the election was announced the Greens changed two of their policies: they announced their support for the Sydney-Devonport Bass Strait ferry, which they had previously criticised, and they changed their drug policy to one similar to Labor's. However, even after changing their drugs policy, pamphlets delivered by the Liberals claimed the Greens had a "crazy policy" to legalise drugs such as cannabis. The Greens promised that in the case of a minority government they would work co-operatively with both parties.

The Greens released a wide range of policies, and unlike in previous campaigns there was little attention given to forestry issues. They stated their opposition to the proposed Gunns Limited Pulp Mill in its current form. They proposed an alternative forestry policy to that of the major parties; they would reserve more of Tasmania's old growth forests, use plantation timber instead and process timber locally. One Tasmanian forestry small business group supported the policy.

With polls showing minority government a possibility in the final stages of the campaign, the Greens moved to reassure voters they would be responsible with a share of the power. Greens leader Peg Putt slammed Lennon's warning about the perils of minority government as "outrageous scare tactics" and hypocritical in the face of plummeting house prices in areas affected by forestry operations.

== Key seats ==
The key seats were widely said to be Labor's third seats in Braddon and Franklin. Had Labor lost both of these seats, a minority government would have been likely. The Greens were hoping to pick up an extra seat from Labor in both Braddon and Denison.

== Results ==
Summary of the Results of the 2006 Tasmanian state election, House of Assembly
Party	Votes	%	+/–	Seats	+/–
Labor	152,544	49.27	▼2.61	14	Steady
Liberal	98,511	31.82	▲4.43	7	Steady
Greens	51,501	16.63	▼1.50	4	Steady
Tasmania First	1,602	0.52	▲0.34	0	Steady
Socialist Alliance	494	0.16	▼0.08	0	Steady
Independents	4,970	1.61	▲0.10	0	Steady
Total	309,622	100.00	–	25	–
Valid votes	309,622	95.56			
Invalid/blank votes	14,386	4.44			
Total votes	324,008	100.00			
Registered voters/turnout	341,481	94.88			

Labor retained majority government after an unexpected strong performance, winning 14 of the 25 seats, despite a 2.6% decrease in their primary vote. Early in the counting Tourism Minister Paula Wriedt seemed likely to lose her seat in Franklin to Liberal candidate Vanessa Goodwin, however after preference distribution she secured the final vacancy. Labor's vote increased slightly in Bass, where former federal politician Michelle O'Byrne topped the poll. Media commentators claimed that Labor would take the final seat in Bass where the Greens were short of a quota, however ALP candidate Steve Reissig narrowly missed out and the Greens held their seat.

The Liberals retained their seven seats and nearly gained a seat at the expense of Labor in Franklin. Will Hodgman in Franklin outpolled Hidding. The Liberal primary vote rose by 4.4% to 31.8%.

After early speculation that the Greens might retain only two seats, they retained all four of their seats. The Greens came close to losing Kim Booth's seat in Bass, largely as a result of the strong victory of Labor's Michelle O'Byrne. Booth won the seat by the slim margin of 136 votes. Had the Tasmanian Greens lost one of their four seats, they would have lost their status as a major party and would lose financial resources, offices and support staff. The Greens failed to win a hoped-for second seat in Denison or to win a seat in Braddon. The Greens primary vote fell by 1.5% to 16.6%.

=== Leaders' comments after the election ===
Re-elected Tasmanian Premier Paul Lennon has said he will use the majority won in the state election to make the state an Australian leader. "We've made the economy strong again," he said. "We've taken Tasmania from the bottom to the top of the economic pile." He committed his Government to be economically progressive, socially progressive, and to speak out for children. Lennon also expressed a desire to lead the nation economically and socially, and with Aboriginal reconciliation, pledging to "resolve once and for all the Stolen Generation".

Tasmanian Opposition Leader Rene Hidding conceded defeat, saying a majority government - even if it is Labor - is good news for the state. "After the disaster of 2002 it was universally accepted that we would need at least two elections to be in a position to win government," he said. Hidding also paid tribute to Lennon, stating that "Paul Lennon has been and is a worthy opponent".

Greens leader Peg Putt said the Tasmanian election has been the grubbiest campaign the party has ever seen, and stated that everyone had targeted the Greens during the campaign. "We have had the might of big business, unions, Labor and Liberal and more, all directed against us," she said. Putt accused small groups of running a smear campaigns, and called for disclosure laws to ensure transparency. She said her party campaigned with honour and integrity.

== Distribution of votes ==
=== Primary vote by division ===
	Bass	Braddon	Denison	Franklin	Lyons
Labor Party	49.61%	50.84%	46.95%	47.17%	51.9%
Liberal Party	33.78%	37.27%	26.55%	31.37%	29.96%
Tasmanian Greens	13.56%	10.31%	24.07%	19.42%	15.82%
Other	3.06%	1.58%	2.43%	2.05%	2.32%

=== Distribution of seats ===
Electorate	Seats held
Bass	
Braddon	
Denison	
Franklin	
Lyons	

Labor
Liberal
Green

== See also ==
- Tasmanian Legislative Council
- Members of the Tasmanian House of Assembly, 2006-2010
- Candidates of the 2006 Tasmanian state election
