= Ross Butler (politician) =

Australian politician

(Alan) Ross Butler (born 10 October 1943) is an Australian politician, was a Labor Party member of the Tasmanian House of Assembly from 2008 to 2010, representing the electorate of Franklin. He won his seat on a countback of votes on 10 June 2008 after the sitting member and Premier of Tasmania Paul Lennon resigned in May 2008. He was defeated at the 2010 state election.

Prior to entering Parliament, Ross Butler had worked as a French and German language teacher in the Tasmanian education system, subsequently rising to be Principal of Glenora District High School, Murray High School in Queenstown and Cosgrove High School in Hobart. During his teaching career he held senior elected positions within both the Australian Education Union and its predecessor organisation, the Tasmanian Teachers' Federation. After retiring from education he worked as a real estate agent, financial advisor and taxi driver before entering Parliament.

Between 1960 and 1962 he completed a BA at the University of Tasmania and later was awarded a Master of Education through the Tasmanian College of Advanced Education. Ross Butler is a Fellow of the Australian Institute of Company Directors.

Ross Butler is married to Margaret and they have three adult children. In the winter he officiates as an Australian rules football umpire in amateur Tasmanian leagues.
