= Paul O'Halloran =

Australian politician (born 1950)

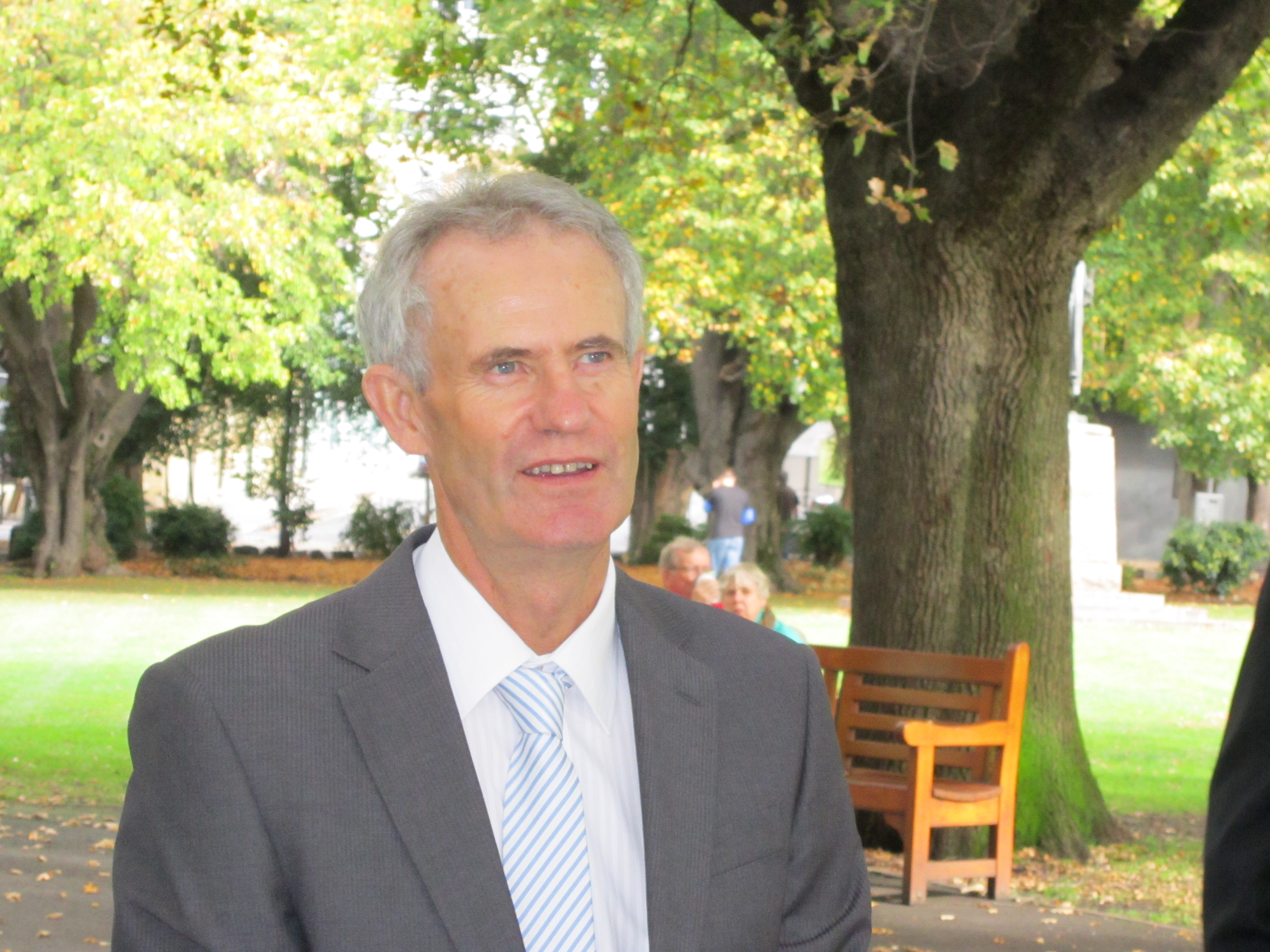

Member of the Tasmanian House of Assembly for Braddon
- In office 20 March 2010 – 15 March 2014

Personal details
- Born: 17 April 1950 (age 76) Ouse, Tasmania, Australia
- Party: Greens

Paul Basil O'Halloran (born 17 April 1950) is an Australian former politician.

== Early life ==
O'Halloran grew up on a dairy farm at Preolenna on the north west coast of Tasmania and later moved to North Motton. Early in life he was a Labor supporter, but his activism in the Franklin Dam dispute led him to the Greens. Prior to politics, he was a schoolteacher and administrator and later a scientist at the University of Tasmania, where he managed a university agricultural industry project aimed at linking educator providers with industry.

== Political career ==
O'Halloran was a Greens candidate for several state elections before being elected to the Division of Braddon in the Tasmanian House of Assembly in 2010, receiving 7.9% of first preference votes. O'Halloran is the first Greens member for Braddon since Di Hollister lost her seat in 1998.

He was not re-elected at the 2014 House of Assembly elections.
