= Brenton Best =

Australian politician

Member of Parliament for Division of Braddon
- In office 24 February 1996 – 15 March 2014

Personal details
- Born: 13 November 1963 (age 62) Devonport, Tasmania
- Party: Independent (since 2018)
- Other political affiliations: Independent Labor (2017); Labor (before 2017)

Brenton Roy Best (born 13 November 1963) is an Australian politician. He was elected to the Tasmanian House of Assembly in 1996 as a Labor member for Braddon.

== Biography ==
Best was born on 13 November 1963 in Devonport, Tasmania.

At the age of 17 he began working as an engine driver, and was elected in 1987 to be the Tasmanian organiser of the Federated Engine Drivers and Fireman's Association of Australasia, and in 1994 to the Tasmanian Trades & Labor Council and Alderman Devonport City Council.

== Electoral history ==
He was elected to the Tasmanian House of Assembly on 24 February 1996 for the Labor Party, and was defeated on 15 March 2014.

In 2017, Best lost a recount in Braddon after nominating as an independent Labor candidate. He later ran in the 2018 state election and received 593 votes.

1979 - 1986 Engine Driver Edgell's Birdseye Plant Devonport (1983 elected FEDFA Union Shop Steward). 1986 - 1988 Industrial Officer FEDFA Union. 1988 - 1991 Union Organiser FEDFA (President Devonport Trades & Labour Council). 1991 - 1995 State Union Organiser CFMEU. 1991 - 1996 Alderman Devonport City Council. 1996 Elected to Parliament House of Assembly, Tasmania. 1998 Land Transport, reformed land transport industry for Tasmania providing efficient freight and passenger services, working with key stakeholders, restructuring the industry, designing legislation introducing the first transport changes since 1925. 1999 Don College Multi-Purpose Facility: secured $1.67 million in funding by working with the college and community to identify and demonstrate the need for the facility. 2000 Designed, implemented and marketed modern sustainable Public Passenger transport bus service ‘Merseylink’, linking regional population 35,000 people; Ulverstone, Devonport, Latrobe, Port Sorell. 2001 Chaired Devonport Reece High School Community Reference Group working with the community, Education Department oversighting strategic design and building of new Reece High School. (post being destroyed by fire). 2002 Deputy Speaker House of Assembly, Tasmanian Parliament. 2003 Spearheaded Hospitality training needs securing necessary funding, to establish Drysdale Hospitality training Campus at Valley Road, Devonport TAFE. 2005 Latrobe High School Redevelopment, achieved $2.9Mil funding working with high school community to identify and highlight need for upgrade. 2006 Developed a sustainable medical services plan interviewing doctors, medical staff and community representatives to prevent Mersey hospital from closure. 2007 Implemented new sustainable health services plan at Mersey hospital meeting elective day surgery needs and lobbied for upgraded Devonport dental clinic services. 2008 Designed and implemented new passenger transport service linking North West Coast Tasmanian regional population 60,000 people North West Coast; Devonport, Latrobe, Port Sorell with Turners Beach Ulverstone Penguin and Burnie. 2009 Oversight service design, development of new Queenstown hospital and West Coast medical services for Zeehan. 2009 Devonport Mersey Bluff Beach Redevelopment, secured $1Mil funding from State Government. 2009 Developed industry restructure plan to grow niche businesses in response to industry factory closures on the North West Coast, lobbied for Northern Tasmania Innovation and Investment $17Mil Fund, oversighted, assisted businesses applications in liaison with Department of Economic Development 2010 Appointed Parliamentary Secretary to the Premier (North West Economy) 2010 Devonport Airport, assisted establishment of local consortium proponent (private/local government), planning developing an industry hub proposal, lobbying regulatory authorities to achieve tendering process and business hub. 2010 Chair Tasmanian Innovative Farming Produce Task Force (McCain's closure of vegetable processing). Developed new market business opportunities for Tasmanian farmers in partnership with UTAS Burnie Campus. Implement Tasmanian Vegetable Industry Strategic Plan, creating alternative new business models with international exporting of produce. 2011 Devonport Aquatic Centre, secured $5Mil funding from State Government in partnership with Devonport City Council and Federal Government. 2011 Vegetable Industry Development Program, designed program to turn farm businesses into manufacturing processing operations through logistical support, new markets and value adding to existing products into local and overseas markets. 2011 Dairy Industry, facilitated growth through logistical support with Woolnorth VDL company dairy expansions assisting Tasmanian Dairy Products establish new powdered milk factory at Smithton. 2012 Implemented State-wide Sirolli Entrepreneurial Enterprise Facilitation projects to create enterprise opportunities in regional communities West Coast and North West Coast Tasmania, completed training Sirolli Institute ‘Enterprise Facilitation’ - ‘Trinity Management’. 2013 Implemented and chaired Simplot Stakeholders Group, identified efficiencies to create and maintain sustainable operations and propose new market opportunities. 2013 Implemented Cape Innovations Enterprise Facilitation in Circular Head. 2013 Chair Tasmanian Resources Development Committee to develop viable industrial hemp industry plan for Tasmania. 2014 Developed State-wide Farm Enterprise manufacture processing policy strategy, based on Vegetable Industry Development Program, (in 2½ years 4 farm businesses increased turnover $2mill creating 10 new jobs) 2015 – 2023 Director Best Hire equipment hire located at Shearwater 2018 Currently Director Tiny House Taswide Pty Ltd, manufacturing affordable housing, prefabricated transportable NCC compliance in Tasmania wide.
