= Paul Lennon =

Australian politician (born 1955)

Paul Lennon AO

42nd Premier of Tasmania
- In office 21 March 2004 – 26 May 2008
- Monarch: Elizabeth II
- Governor: Richard Butler; William Cox; Peter Underwood
- Deputy: David Llewellyn; Bryan Green; Steve Kons; David Bartlett
- Preceded by: Jim Bacon
- Succeeded by: David Bartlett

Leader of the Labor Party of Tasmania
- In office 21 March 2004 – 26 May 2008
- Preceded by: Jim Bacon
- Succeeded by: David Bartlett

13th Deputy Premier of Tasmania
- In office 14 September 1998 – 21 March 2004
- Premier: Tony Rundle; Jim Bacon
- Preceded by: Sue Napier
- Succeeded by: David Llewellyn

Personal details
- Born: 8 October 1955 (age 71) Hobart, Tasmania, Australia
- Party: Labor Party
- Spouse: Margaret Lennon
- Profession: Trade union official

Paul Anthony Lennon AO (born 8 October 1955) is an Australian Labor Party politician. He was Premier of Tasmania from 21 March 2004 until his resignation on 26 May 2008. He was member of the Tasmanian House of Assembly for the seat of Franklin from 1990 until officially resigning on 27 May 2008. He left office abruptly after his preferred premier rating fell to 17%, largely as a result of perceptions of corruption in his government's fast-tracked approval of the Gunns Bell Bay Pulp Mill proposal, which had effectively bypassed normal planning procedure.

== Early life ==
Born in Hobart, Lennon attended St Virgil's College (a Catholic school), then worked as a storeman and clerk before becoming an organiser with the Storemen and Packers Union in 1978. Two years later, he was made Tasmanian State Secretary of the Storeman and Packers Union, and from 1982 he was Senior Vice President of the national union. In 1984 Lennon became Secretary of the Tasmanian Trades & Labor Council, and also a member of the Executive of the Australian Council of Trade Unions.

Lennon first ran for parliament at the 1989 state election, but failed to obtain a seat. He was elected to the Tasmanian House of Assembly in 1990 on a recount of votes following the resignation of Ken Wriedt (who had been State ALP Leader 1982–1986) and immediately became Deputy Leader of the Labor Party. He was Shadow Minister for Industrial Relations, Workplace Standards, Workers' Compensation, Public Sector Management, Forests, Mines, Racing and Gaming, and Leader of Opposition Business in the House of Assembly.

== Jim Bacon government ==
On the election of a Labor government under Jim Bacon in 1998, Lennon became Deputy Premier, Minister for Infrastructure, Energy and Resources and Minister for Racing and Gaming. Following the re-election of the government in 2002, he became Minister for Economic Development, Energy and Resources, and Minister for Racing and Sport and Recreation.

== Premier of Tasmania ==
In February 2004 Bacon was diagnosed with lung cancer and stood down as Premier to begin treatment. Lennon was Acting Premier until 21 March, when Bacon resigned and Lennon was sworn in as Tasmania's 42nd Premier. He was also Treasurer until 2006 when he was succeeded by Michael Aird.

For years Lennon and Bacon were close friends as well as colleagues. Lennon was emotional as he formally assumed the premiership, with Bacon looking on. "It's hard to describe how you feel when someone who has been that close to you also happens to be your boss", Lennon subsequently told an interviewer: "It was a very tough time. A very tough time indeed."

Lennon is known as an active proponent of Tasmania's forestry industry, which is a partnership between its investors, managers, and workers. This attitude made him very unpopular with the Greens, numerous conservation groups and others on the left. He represents a long tradition of conservative, pro-business Labor leadership in Tasmania, as represented in the 1970s by Eric Reece and in the 1980s by Harry Holgate. Both Lennon's Labor government and the State Opposition were much censured for their close ties with the logging company Gunns Limited, not least over the drafting of new legislation.

In January 2006, Lennon faced criticism in the media over allegations of impropriety when it was revealed that he had received an upgrade from a A$200 per night room in the Crown Casino to a six-star suite worth up to A$4000 per night, complete with a private butler. The Crown Casino is owned by the Packer family's Publishing and Broadcasting Limited, which also owns a 50% stake in Betfair, the company to which Lennon's government days later awarded a A$700 million internet gaming licence.

At the 2006 state election, Lennon successfully led the Labor Party to a majority government. This happened in defiance of many pre-election media analyses, which predicted that the ALP would either lose office outright or be forced into a coalition.

== Allegations of corruption and downfall ==
In 2006, allegations of corruption involving Mr Lennon reached fever pitch, with numerous news outlets detailing instances of perceived graft and corruption. Among these were allegations surrounding the renovation of Mr Lennon's home by Gunns' subsidiary Hinman Wright and Manser. Mr Lennon refused to fully disclose the amount paid for the services provided by Hinman Wright and Manser, a large-scale civil construction firm not traditionally associated with residential home renovations. While no impropriety was officially found or prosecuted, the fact the renovations happened in such close proximity of time with Gunns negotiations with the Tasmanian Government in relation to a $2 billion Pulp Mill, aroused serious public suspicions.

On 26 May 2008, following an opinion poll which showed his preferred premier rating at 17%, Lennon resigned as Premier of Tasmania. The Deputy Premier, David Bartlett, received his commission at Government House as the 43rd Tasmanian Premier shortly thereafter. He resigned from his seat of Franklin the following day. He had been the longest serving member for the seat of Franklin.

On 10 June 2008, the Tasmanian Electoral Commission announced that former school principal and taxi driver Ross Butler would replace Lennon in parliament, following a recount of preferences made at the previous election.

== Family ==
Lennon is married to Margaret and has two children.

Political offices
Preceded by Sue Napier	Deputy Premier of Tasmania; 1998–2004	Succeeded by David Llewellyn
Preceded by Jim Bacon	Premier of Tasmania; 2004–2008	Succeeded by David Bartlett
Party political offices
Preceded by Jim Bacon	Leader of the Labor Party in Tasmania; 2004–2008	Succeeded by David Bartlett
