= Kim Booth =

Australian politician (born 1951)

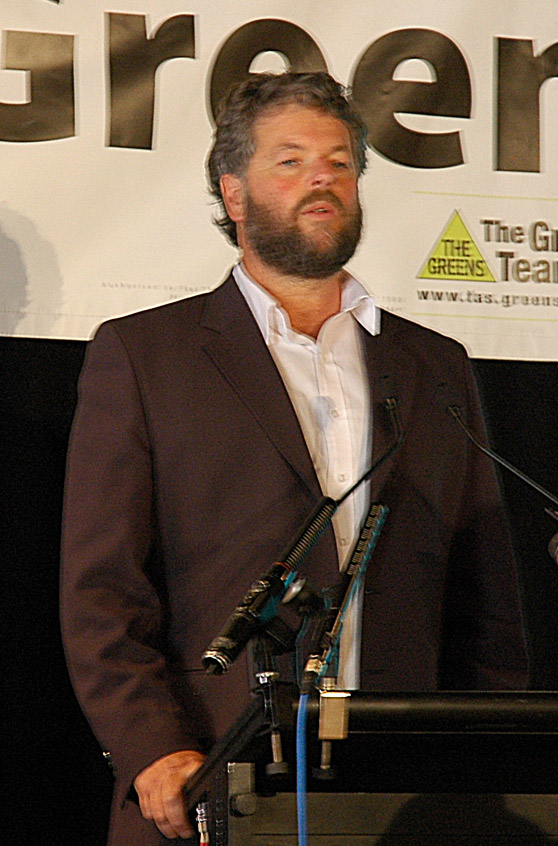
- Booth in 2006

Leader of the Tasmanian Greens
- In office 7 April 2014 – 20 May 2015
- Preceded by: Nick McKim
- Succeeded by: Cassy O'Connor

Member of the Tasmanian House of Assembly for Bass
- In office 20 July 2002 – 20 May 2015
- Succeeded by: Andrea Dawkins
- Constituency: Bass

Personal details
- Born: 1951 (age 74–75) New South Wales, Australia
- Party: Greens
- Occupation: Sawmiller

Kim Dion Booth (born 1951) is a former Australian politician. He was the leader of the Tasmanian Greens from April 2014 to May 2015, and represented the Division of Bass in the Tasmanian House of Assembly.

== Political career ==
After the 2010 Tasmanian state election, Booth refused to support the Greens–Labor deal, warning that the deal with Labor would hurt the Greens. He held the Greens portfolios of Forests; Energy; Attorney-General and Justice; Small Business; Industry; Racing and Gaming; and Veterans Affairs.

He was re-elected at the 2014 House of Assembly elections, and was subsequently elected as party leader.

On 20 May 2015, Booth announced he was resigning from Parliament and as leader of the Greens with immediate effect, following the death of his father. His seat in Bass was filled by Andrea Dawkins after the TEC conducted a count back from the 2014 election results.

Party political offices
Preceded by Nick McKim	Leader of the Tasmanian Greens; 2014–2015	Succeeded by Cassy O'Connor
