= Tasmanian Greens =

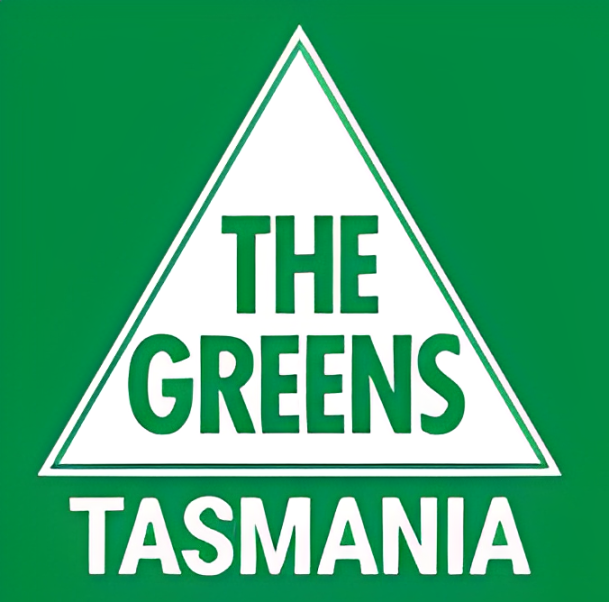
- Leader: Rosalie Woodruff
- Deputy Leader: Vica Bayley
- Founded: 1992
- Preceded by: Green Independents
- Headquarters: Level 1; 162 Macquarie St; Hobart TAS 7000
- Ideology: Green politics Progressivism
- Political position: Left-wing
- National affiliation: Australian Greens
- Colours: Green
- House of Reps (Tasmanian seats): 0 / 5
- Senate (Tasmanian seats): 2 / 12
- House of Assembly: 4 / 35
- Legislative Council: 1 / 15
- Local Government: 9 / 263

Website
- greens.org.au/tas

Seats in local government
- Clarence: 2 / 12
- Glenorchy: 1 / 10
- Hobart: 3 / 12
- Huon Valley: 2 / 9
- Kingborough: 2 / 10
- Tasman: 1 / 7

The Tasmanian Greens are a political party in Australia which developed from numerous environmental campaigns in Tasmania, including the flooding of Lake Pedder and the Franklin Dam campaign. They form a part of the Australian Greens.

Following the 2025 Tasmanian election, the party holds four seats in the Tasmanian House of Assembly, and is currently led by Rosalie Woodruff. At a federal level, two Tasmanian senators – Nick McKim and Vanessa Bleyer – are members of the Greens.

The party's current shadow ministry can be found at Woodruff Shadow Ministry.

== History ==
The party's history can be traced back to the formation of the United Tasmania Group (UTG) (the first established 'Green' party in the world), which first ran candidates in the 1972 election. Many people involved in that group went on to form the Tasmanian Greens. Bob Brown stood as an Australian Senate candidate for UTG in 1975.

=== 1980s ===
In the 1982 state election, Bob Brown stood unsuccessfully as an independent in the Denison electorate. In December of that year, Norm Sanders—a sitting member for the Australian Democrats—stood down from state parliament to contest the Senate in a Federal election. A countback of votes followed and Bob Brown was elected to the vacancy, commencing his term in January 1983. The two had much in common—both having been directors of the Tasmanian Wilderness Society—Norm Sanders being considered to be Australia's first elected "green" member of parliament.

Immediately prior to taking the seat, Bob Brown had spent 19 days in Risdon Prison for obstructing workers at the Franklin River dam site. He took his seat on the day of his release. He was re-elected in the 1986 election along with Gerry Bates in the Franklin electorate.

In the 1989 state election a total of five Greens—Christine Milne, Lance Armstrong, Di Hollister, Gerry Bates and Bob Brown—were elected after a community backlash against a proposed paper pulp mill at Wesley Vale near Devonport. At the time of the election they were known simply as The Independents. In December 1991 they changed their name to The Green Independents. They held the balance of power in the government for three years, keeping Michael Field's minority Labor Party government in power after signing an agreement known as the Labor–Green Accord. The February 1992 election saw all five sitting Greens re-elected but with a majority Liberal government in power.

Greens supporter Neville Curtis started the magazine Daily Planet in 1989, which later became the official magazine of the Green Independents.

=== 1990s ===
During 1990–1991 Brown advocated for a merger of the Green Independents with the Australian Democrats to form the "Green Democrats", as opposed to confederating with other Green Parties and forming the Australian Greens. However, following a change in leadership in the Democrats, this plan could not continue and the Independents aligned themselves towards a unified Green Party.

In August 1992 the Green Independents moved to officially form the Tasmanian Greens.

In 1993 Bob Brown stood down to contest the lower house seat of Denison in the federal election and Peg Putt took his seat on a recount. Christine Milne became leader. In May 1995 Gerry Bates resigned and his seat was taken by Mike Foley.

At the 1996 election, four Greens were returned (Lance Armstrong lost his seat in Bass) and they again held the balance of power, this time with a Liberal government.

After seven years of minority governments, the Labor and Liberal parties passed a bill reducing the number of Lower House seats, thus increasing the quota of votes needed under Tasmania's Hare Clark voting system from 12.5% to 16.67%. In 2011, Labor MP David Llewellyn confirmed to ABC Radio that the two major parties had "conspired" to reduce the number of seats in the House specifically to increase the quota for minor parties such as the Greens: "I could admit now that being part of the government back in 1998 or 1997 in conspiring, suppose that's not the best of words but that's what it was, between the Liberal Party and the Labor Party to reduce the size of Parliament on the basis that it would take more percentage for minor parties to actually win a seat."

The 1998 election returned a majority Labor government, as well as a sole Green member—Peg Putt—who had little chance of exercising any influence, but would offer bills into Parliament knowing they would in all likelihood be voted against by both Liberal and Labor parties.

=== 2000s ===
The 2002 election saw a major resurgence of their popularity, with the party winning 4 seats, and outpolling the Liberal party in the Hobart based seat of Denison. The swing was primarily against the Liberal Party, while the Labor party continued in the majority. The statewide 18.2% vote in 2002 was the highest vote recorded for a Green party at a state or national level anywhere in the world.

At the 2004 federal election, former Tasmanian Greens leader Christine Milne and WA's Rachel Siewert joined Bob Brown and NSW's Kerry Nettle in the Senate, doubling the Green representation.

On 23 July 2005, the Greens celebrated 33.3 years of political activity and achievements, with a large party entitled "33-and-a-third – Now we're Long Playing!"

The 2006 election saw a 1.5% swing against the Greens but all four sitting members were returned. In the lead up to this election Tasmanians for a Better Future organised a campaign against minority government suggesting it was a risky outcome for commerce and industry.

Peg Putt resigned from the House of Assembly on 7 July 2008, and was replaced as party leader by Nick McKim. Cassy O'Connor was elected as her replacement in Denison after a recount of votes.

=== 2010s ===
During the 2010 Tasmanian state election, the Tasmanian Greens secured a swing of 5% for a total of 21.6% of the primary vote (The highest ever vote the greens recorded in any state election as of 2024), picking up a seat in Braddon and securing the balance of power in parliament, with the Tasmanian Greens members of the Tasmanian House of Assembly being Cassy O'Connor, Nick McKim, Kim Booth, Tim Morris and Paul O'Halloran.

On 16 January 2014, Premier Lara Giddings announced that a power sharing arrangement with the Tasmanian Greens was over.

At the 2014 Tasmanian state elections there was a 7.8% swing away from the Greens with the party losing two of its five seats. The re-elected Greens leader Nick McKim said the swing against the Greens was due to electoral support for the conservatives and the "tarnish" of the Greens association with the previous Labor government. Subsequently, Kim Booth was appointed as party leader, however he resigned as leader and from the Tasmanian Parliament on 20 May 2015. Cassy O'Connor was elected to replace him on 11 June 2015.

In mid 2015, with the resignations of Kim Booth and Nick Mckim and being replaced by Andrea Dawkins and Rosalie Woodruff respectively, the Tasmania Greens was entirely made up of female representatives in the Tasmanian Parliament, until the election of Vica Bayley in 2023.

=== 2020s ===
On 13 July 2023, Cassy O'Connor announced her resignation from her House of Assembly seat of Clark, and as Tasmanian Greens Leader. O'Connor also announced she would seek preselection to contest the seat of Hobart in the Tasmanian Legislative Council in 2024. Rosalie Woodruff was confirmed to replace O'Connor as leader of the party following the election of Vica Bayley to the seat of Clark.

At the 2024 Tasmanian Election, the Greens received 13.9% of the primary vote with a positive swing of 1.5% towards the party. The party increased its representation from two seats to five, electing members in the divisions of Lyons and Bass, in addition to re-electing party Leader Rosalie Woodruff in Franklin, and Deputy Leader Vica Bayley in Clark. The party also picked up a second seat in Clark for the first time.

The Greens would go onto win their first seat in the Tasmanian Legislative Council in the party's history, with the election of Cassie O'Connor to the Division of Hobart in May 2024. The party now holds six seats across Tasmania's two Houses of Parliament, their highest level of representation to date.

In June 2025, the Greens supported a Labor backed no confidence motion in Premier Jeremy Rockliff. The motion passed with support from the crossbench and Labor Speaker Michelle O’Byrne, triggering a snap election. The party was able to hold onto its five seats at the subsequent 2025 Tasmanian Election, with all incumbent members reelected. The result of the 2025 Election was a hung parliament, with the Liberal party on 14 seats, Labor on 10 and 11 other members on the cross bench, including 5 Greens. After weeks of negotiations, Greens Leader Rosalie Woodruff announced on 12 August that the party would not support Labor Leader Dean Winter to form government in the event of a no-confidence motion, stating his unwillingness to negotiate on certain issues. They did however state that there was a week left for negotiations before parliament returned should Winter want to further negotiations. Winter had previously committed to not "do deals" with the Greens, citing Labor's support for "traditional industries" like forestry, mining and aquaculture.

Greens Leader Rosalie Woodruff moved a censure motion on Premier Jeremy Rockliff, which passed the House of Assembly on 17 June 2026 with support of the Labor Opposition, and several independent members. With the motion passing, Rockliff is the first Tasmanian Premier to be censured by parliament.

== Structure ==
There are five Electorate Branches—one representing each state/federal electorate—that are responsible for choosing candidates at all levels of government.

The party has an annual state conference and annual general meeting. The State Executive is responsible for the day-to-day administration of the party.

The Tasmanian Greens, together with other state and territory parties, form the Australian Greens.

== Local government ==
Unlike other political parties in the state, the Tasmanian Greens officially endorse candidates to run in local government elections. They first stood local government candidates in 1999 with two candidates elected. Following the 2005 elections there were ten elected Greens councillors. This expanded to 13 after the 2007 elections.

== Leaders ==
#	Leader	Electorate	Term start	Term end	Time in office	Elections contested	Premier (term)
1	Bob Brown	Denison	13 May 1992	13 March 1993	304 days	None	Groom 1992–1996
2	Christine Milne	Lyons	13 March 1993	29 August 1998	5 years, 169 days	1996, 1998	Groom 1992–1996
2	Christine Milne	Lyons	13 March 1993	29 August 1998	5 years, 169 days	1996, 1998	Rundle 1996–1998
3	Peg Putt	Denison	29 August 1998	7 July 2008	9 years, 313 days	2002, 2006	Rundle 1996–1998
3	Peg Putt	Denison	29 August 1998	7 July 2008	9 years, 313 days	2002, 2006	Bacon 1998–2004
3	Peg Putt	Denison	29 August 1998	7 July 2008	9 years, 313 days	2002, 2006	Lennon 2004–2008
3	Peg Putt	Denison	29 August 1998	7 July 2008	9 years, 313 days	2002, 2006	Bartlett 2008–2011
4	Nick McKim	Franklin	7 July 2008	7 April 2014	5 years, 274 days	2010, 2014	Bartlett 2008–2011
4	Nick McKim	Franklin	7 July 2008	7 April 2014	5 years, 274 days	2010, 2014	Giddings 2011–2014
4	Nick McKim	Franklin	7 July 2008	7 April 2014	5 years, 274 days	2010, 2014	Hodgman 2014–2020
5	Kim Booth	Bass	7 April 2014	20 May 2015	1 year, 30 days	None	Hodgman 2014–2020
6	Cassy O'Connor	Clark	12 June 2015	13 July 2023	8 years, 31 days	2018, 2021	Hodgman 2014–2020
6	Cassy O'Connor	Clark	12 June 2015	13 July 2023	8 years, 31 days	2018, 2021	Gutwein 2020–2022
6	Cassy O'Connor	Clark	12 June 2015	13 July 2023	8 years, 31 days	2018, 2021	Rockliff 2022-
7	Rosalie Woodruff	Franklin	13 July 2023	Incumbent	3 years, 131 days	2024, 2025	Rockliff 2022-

== Electoral results ==
=== State ===
Election year	Leader	Votes	% of votes	Seats won	+/–	Name
1972	None	7,741	3.90	0 / 35		United Tasmania Group
1976	None	5,183	2.20	0 / 35	0	United Tasmania Group
1979	None	did not participate				
1982	None	4,273	1.71	0 / 35	0	Independent Greens
1986	None	14,227	5.55	2 / 35	▲2	Independent Greens
1989	Bob Brown	46,797	17.13	5 / 35	▲3	Independent Greens
1992	Bob Brown	37,742	13.23	5 / 35	0	Independent Greens
1996	Christine Milne	32,813	11.14	4 / 35	▼1	Tasmanian Greens
1998	Christine Milne	30,008	10.18	1 / 25	▼3	Tasmanian Greens
2002	Peg Putt	53,746	18.13	4 / 25	▲3	Tasmanian Greens
2006	Peg Putt	51,501	16.63	4 / 25	0	Tasmanian Greens
2010	Nick McKim	69,233	21.61	5 / 25	▲1	Tasmanian Greens
2014	Nick McKim	45,098	13.83	3 / 25	▼2	Tasmanian Greens
2018	Cassy O'Connor	34,491	10.30	2 / 25	▼1	Tasmanian Greens
2021	Cassy O'Connor	42,250	12.38	2 / 25	0	Tasmanian Greens
2024	Rosalie Woodruff	42,370	13.89	5 / 35	▲3	Tasmanian Greens
2025	Rosalie Woodruff	50,545	14.44	5 / 35	0	Tasmanian Greens

=== Federal elections ===
Federal Election Results

Tasmania Primary Vote (HOR)
- 1998: 5.6%
- 2001: 7.8%
- 2004: 9.9%
- 2007: 13.5%
- 2010: 16.8%
- 2013: 8.3%
- 2016: 10.2%
- 2019: 10.1%
- 2022: 12.0%
- 2025: 11.1%

At the 2025 federal election, for the lower house, the Tasmanian Greens secured 11.1% of the vote, this was a drop of 0.9% from the 2022 federal election. In the Senate, former Tasmanian Greens Leader Nick McKim was re elected, with the party recording a positive swing of 0.71%.

== Members of Parliament ==
=== Federal Parliament ===
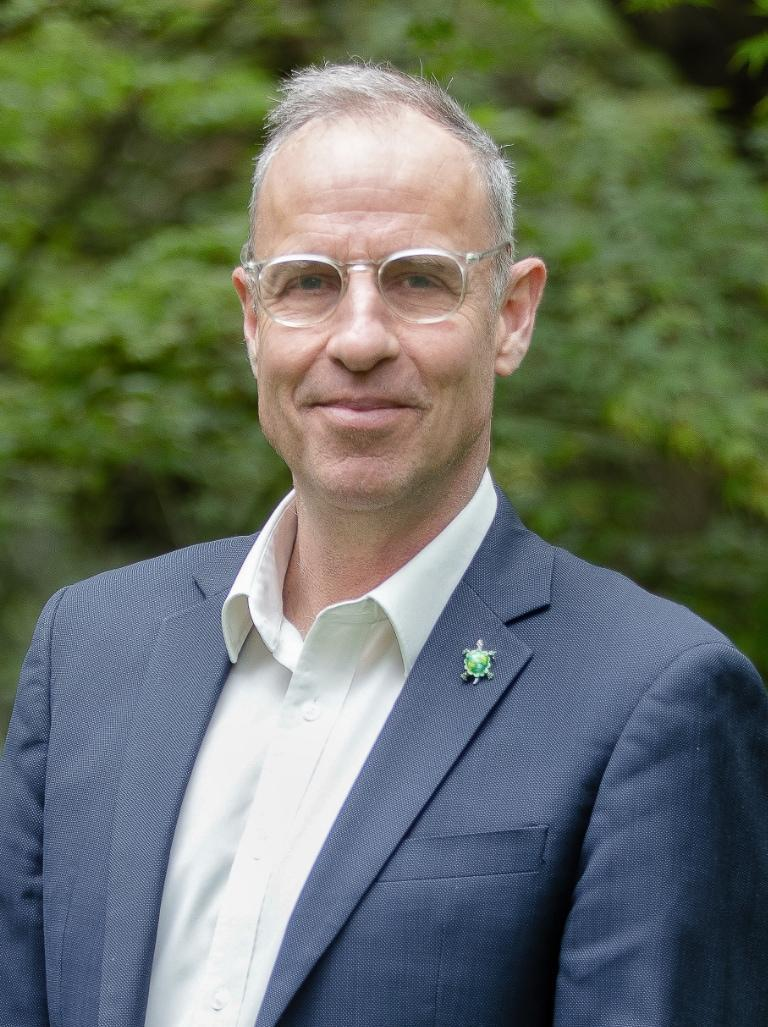
Senator Nick McKim (2015–present)

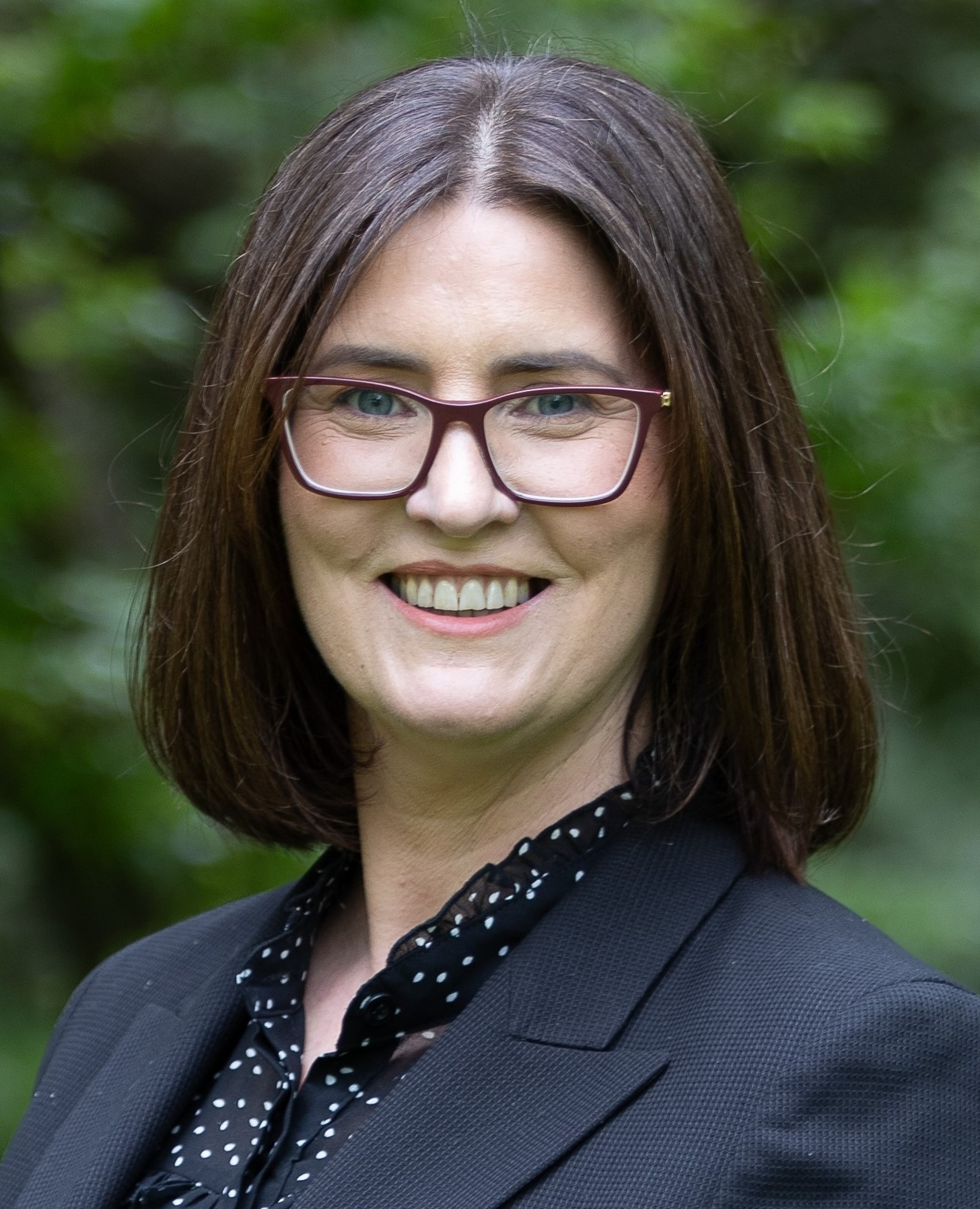
Senator Vanessa Bleyer (2026–present)

==== Former ====
- Senator Bob Brown (1996–2012)
- Senator Christine Milne (2005–2015)
- Senator Peter Whish-Wilson (2012–2026)

=== State Parliament ===
==== House of Assembly ====
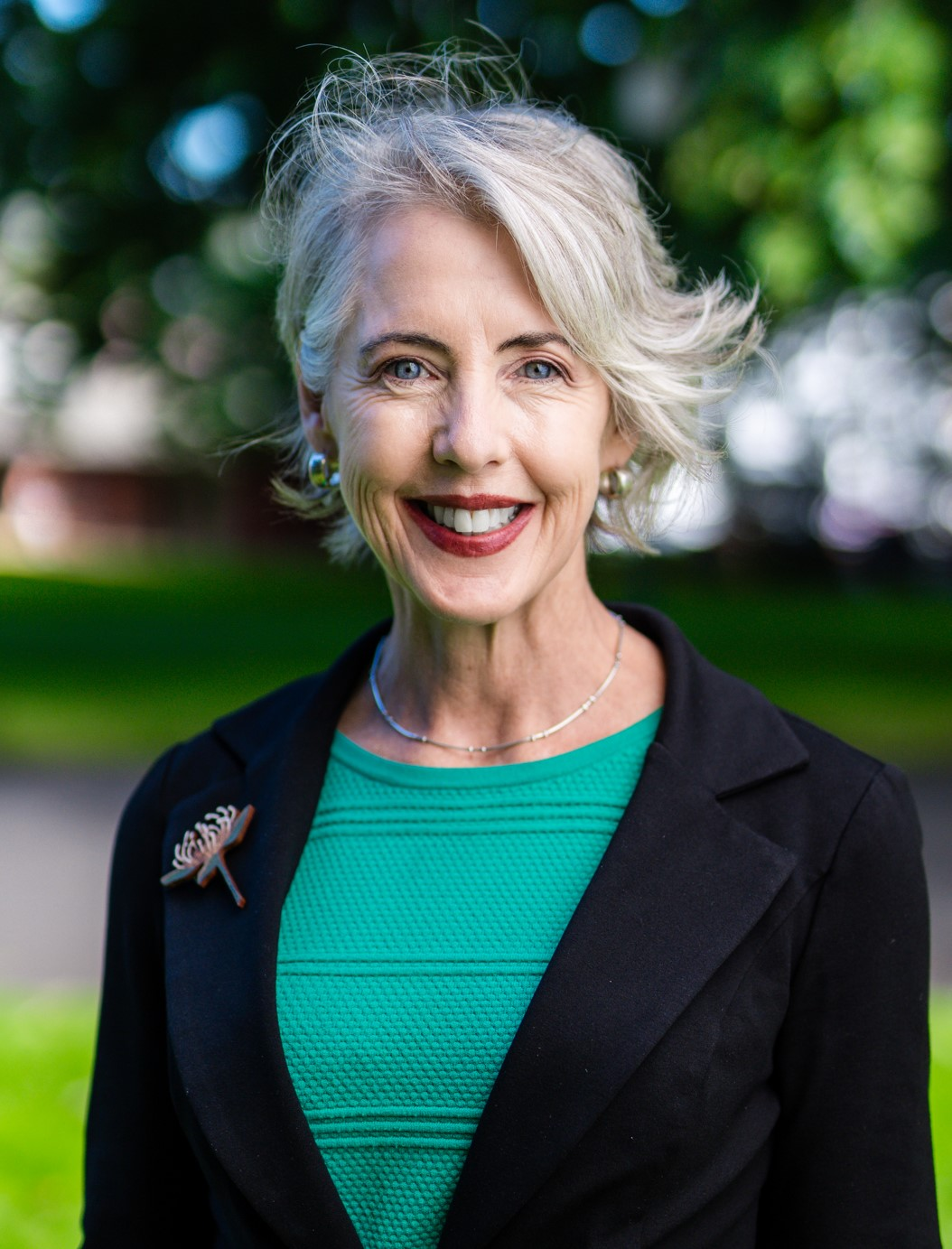
Rosalie Woodruff, MLA for Franklin (2015–present)

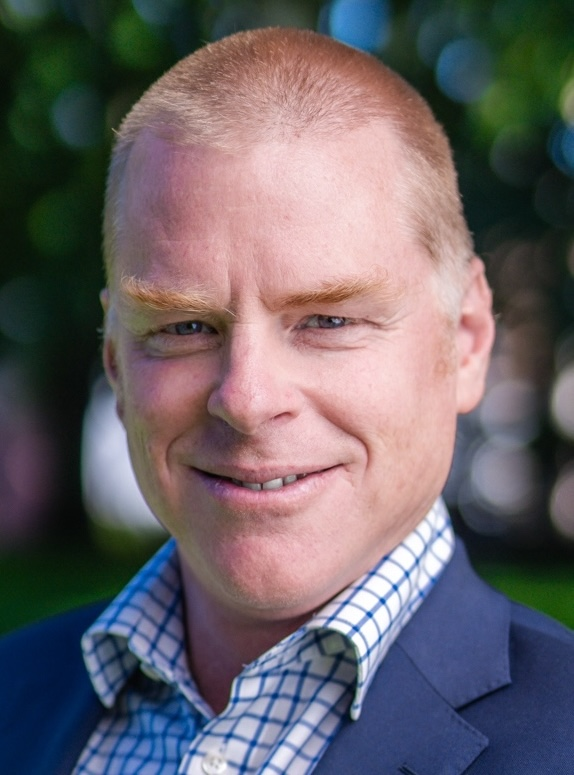
Vica Bayley, MLA for Clark (2023–present)

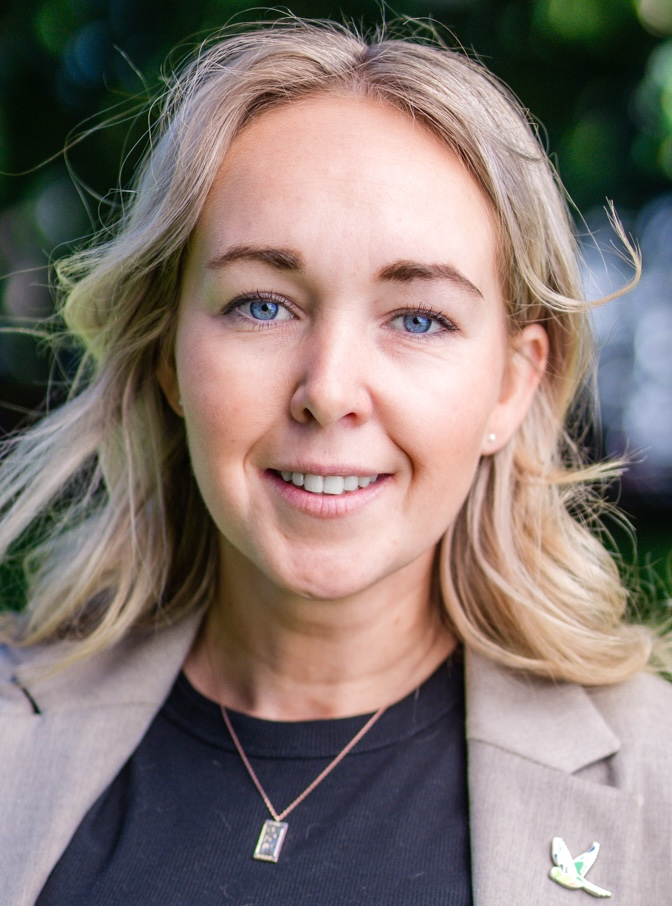
Tabatha Badger, MLA for Lyons (2024–present)

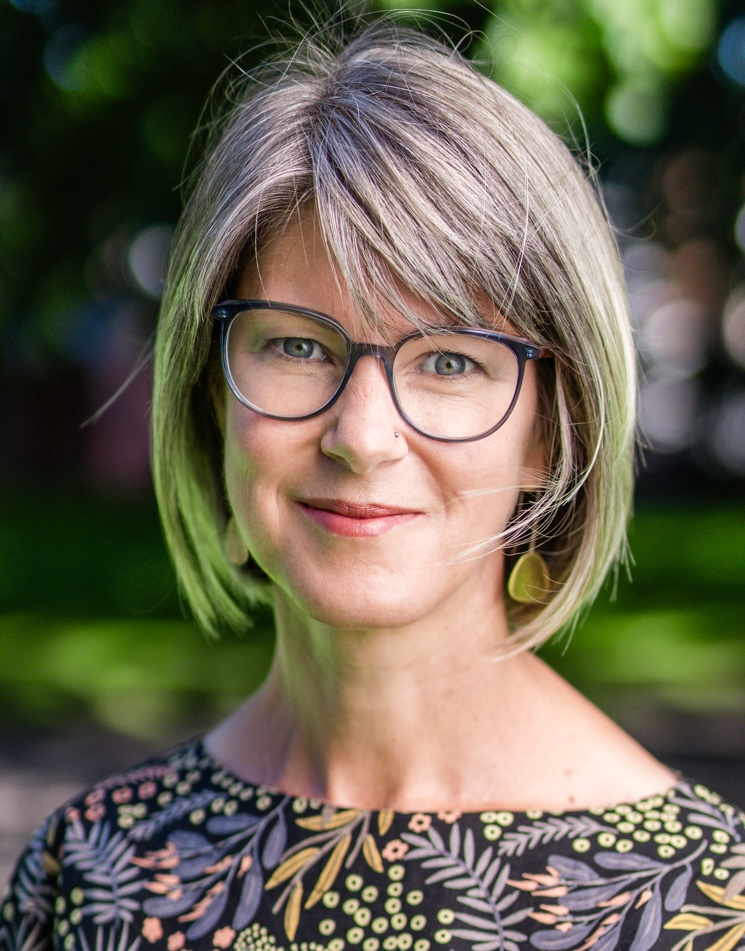
Cecily Rosol, MLA for Bass (2024–present)

==== Legislative Council ====
Cassy O'Connor, MLC for Hobart (2024–present)

=== Former ===
- Bob Brown (1983–1993)
- Gerry Bates (1986–1995)
- Lance Armstrong (1989–1996)
- Di Hollister (1989–1998)
- Christine Milne (1989–1998)
- Peg Putt (1993–2008)
- Mike Foley (1995–1998)
- Kim Booth (2002–2015)
- Tim Morris (2002–2014)
- Nick McKim (2002–2015)
- Paul O'Halloran (2010–2014)
- Andrea Dawkins (2015–2018)
- Helen Burnet (2024–2026)
