= Results of the 2002 Tasmanian state election =

Tasmanian state election, 20 July 2002 House of Assembly << 1998–2006 >>
Enrolled voters	332,473				
Votes cast	311,637		Turnout	93.73	–1.28
Informal votes	15,167		Informal	4.87	+0.96
Summary of votes by party
Party	Primary votes	%	Swing	Seats	Change
Labor	153,798	51.88	+7.09	14	± 0
Liberal	81,185	27.38	–10.67	7	– 3
Greens	53,746	18.13	+7.95	4	+ 3
Democrats	2,019	0.68	–0.21	0	± 0
Socialist Alliance	722	0.24	+0.21	0	± 0
Tasmania First	529	0.18	–4.92	0	± 0
Independent	4,471	1.51	+0.52	0	± 0
Total	296,470			25	

This is a list of House of Assembly results for the 2002 Tasmanian election.

== Results by division ==
=== Bass ===
2002 Tasmanian state election: Bass
Party	Candidate	Votes	%	±%
Quota		9,702		
Labor	Jim Cox (elected 1)	10,252	17.5	+6.0
Labor	Kathryn Hay (elected 2)	9,918	16.9	+16.9
Labor	Anita Smith	2,885	4.9	+4.9
Labor	Geoff Lyons	2,701	4.6	+4.6
Labor	Jenni Jarvis	1,671	2.9	+2.9
Labor	Brian Roe	1,355	2.3	+2.3
Liberal	Sue Napier (elected 4)	6,656	11.4	−4.1
Liberal	Peter Gutwein (elected 5)	5,332	9.1	+9.1
Liberal	David Fry	4,158	7.1	+2.2
Liberal	Mark Baker	1,716	2.9	+2.9
Liberal	Angela Davern	510	0.9	+0.9
Greens	Kim Booth (elected 3)	6,726	11.5	+6.1
Greens	Cynthia Atherton	832	1.4	+1.4
Greens	Leyla Tas	777	1.3	+1.3
Greens	Noah Thomas	698	1.2	+1.2
Greens	David Pittaway	659	1.1	+1.1
Democrats	Vanessa Wallace	203	0.3	+0.3
Democrats	Craig Cooper	184	0.3	+0.3
Democrats	Sancia Colgrave	168	0.3	+0.3
Democrats	Renae Cooper	160	0.3	+0.3
Tasmania First	Merilyn Crack	279	0.5	−0.2
Tasmania First	Andrew Cowling	139	0.2	+0.2
Tasmania First	Joanne Durkin	111	0.2	+0.2
Independent	Dave Davis	239	0.4	+0.4
Independent	Rob Larner	141	0.2	+0.2
Socialist Alliance	Kamala Emanuel	66	0.1	+0.1
Socialist Alliance	Sonja Montaigne	32	0.1	+0.1
Total formal votes		58,568	94.8	−1.1
Informal votes		3,220	5.2	+1.1
Turnout		61,788	93.9	−0.6
Party total votes
Labor		28,782	49.1	+8.0
Liberal		18,372	31.4	−10.5
Greens		9,692	16.5	+7.4
Democrats		715	1.2	−0.4
Tasmania First		529	0.9	−4.8
Independent	Dave Davis	239	0.4	+0.4
Independent	Rob Larner	141	0.2	+0.2
Socialist Alliance		98	0.2	+0.2

=== Braddon ===
2002 Tasmanian state election: Braddon
Party	Candidate	Votes	%	±%
Quota		10,140		
Labor	Bryan Green (elected 1)	10,339	17.0	+9.7
Labor	Steve Kons (elected 3)	8,517	14.0	−3.6
Labor	Brenton Best (elected 4)	6,472	10.6	+3.3
Labor	Mike Gaffney	5,720	9.4	+9.4
Labor	Renai Ellings	711	1.2	+1.2
Labor	Harvey Clarke	592	1.0	+1.0
Liberal	Jeremy Rockliff (elected 2)	7,957	13.1	+13.1
Liberal	Brett Whiteley (elected 5)	4,527	7.4	+1.0
Liberal	Mike Downie	3,496	5.7	+5.7
Liberal	Alan Pattison	3,040	5.0	+5.0
Liberal	Peter Upton	1,130	1.9	+1.9
Greens	Paul O'Halloran	3,943	6.5	+6.1
Greens	Clare Thompson	1,317	2.2	+1.9
Greens	Felicity Harris	790	1.3	+1.3
Greens	Carol Reilly	640	1.1	+1.1
Greens	Patrick Johnson	601	1.0	+1.0
Group D	Malcolm Ryan	489	0.8	+0.8
Group D	John Kelly	250	0.4	+0.4
Independent	Gatty Burnett	307	0.5	+0.5
Total formal votes		60,838	95.2	−0.6
Informal votes		3,090	4.8	+0.6
Turnout		63,928	94.3	−1.8
Party total votes
Labor		32,351	53.2	+9.1
Liberal		20,150	33.1	−9.1
Greens		7,291	12.0	+3.9
Group D		739	1.2	+1.2
Independent	Gatty Burnett	307	0.5	+0.5

=== Denison ===
2002 Tasmanian state election: Denison
Party	Candidate	Votes	%	±%
Quota		10,040		
Labor	Jim Bacon (elected 1)	21,391	35.5	+3.7
Labor	Graeme Sturges (elected 5)	2,849	4.7	+4.7
Labor	David Bartlett	2,554	4.2	+4.2
Labor	James Crotty	2,281	3.8	+3.8
Labor	Judy Jackson (elected 4)	1,551	2.6	−2.4
Greens	Peg Putt (elected 2)	12,036	20.0	+9.5
Greens	Jo Hall	720	1.2	+1.2
Greens	Mat Hines	710	1.2	+1.2
Greens	Tim Graham	651	1.1	+1.1
Greens	Cath Hughes	643	1.1	+1.1
Liberal	Bob Cheek	4,622	7.7	−5.2
Liberal	Michael Hodgman (elected 3)	4,205	7.0	0.0
Liberal	Jan Kuplis	1,925	3.2	+3.2
Liberal	Steve Mav	1,863	3.1	+3.1
Liberal	Tony Steven	811	1.3	+1.3
Liberal	Matt Woolnough	396	0.7	+0.7
Group E	Frank Nicklason	462	0.8	+0.8
Group E	Steve Poulton	143	0.2	+0.2
Socialist Alliance	Alex Bainbridge	224	0.4	+0.4
Socialist Alliance	Shua Garfield	178	0.3	+0.3
Total formal votes		60,235	95.7	−0.6
Informal votes		2,724	4.3	+0.6
Turnout		62,959	92.6	−1.2
Party total votes
Labor		30,626	50.8	+4.5
Greens		14,760	24.5	+11.4
Liberal		13,822	22.9	−13.3
Group E		605	1.0	+1.0
Socialist Alliance		422	0.7	+0.7

=== Franklin ===
2002 Tasmanian state election: Franklin
Party	Candidate	Votes	%	±%
Quota		10,088		
Labor	Paul Lennon (elected 1)	10,994	18.2	+5.1
Labor	Paula Wriedt (elected 2)	8,382	13.8	+3.6
Labor	Lara Giddings (elected 5)	5,548	9.2	+9.2
Labor	Doug Doust	2,732	4.5	+4.5
Labor	Carol Brown	1,993	3.3	+3.3
Labor	Neville Oliver	1,654	2.7	−1.1
Liberal	Will Hodgman (elected 4)	7,489	12.4	+12.4
Liberal	Martin McManus	3,687	6.1	+1.0
Liberal	Derek Smith	1,332	2.2	+2.2
Liberal	Anita Bromfield	1,063	1.8	+1.8
Liberal	Jeff Briscoe	787	1.3	+1.3
Greens	Nick McKim (elected 3)	7,622	12.6	+12.6
Greens	Liz Smith	1,434	2.4	+2.4
Greens	Kay McFarlane	1,131	1.9	+1.9
Greens	Paul Thomas	1,105	1.8	+1.8
Greens	Michele Higgins	1,052	1.7	+1.7
Democrats	Bryan Walpole	634	1.0	+1.0
Democrats	Debra Chandler	360	0.6	+0.6
Democrats	Karen Manskey	310	0.5	+0.5
Independent	Jane Shoobridge	375	0.6	+0.6
Group A	Kaye McPherson	184	0.3	+0.3
Group A	Donna Coleman	148	0.2	+0.2
Independent	Nigel Abbott	307	0.5	+0.5
Socialist Alliance	Brian Millar	103	0.2	+0.2
Socialist Alliance	Glenn Shields	99	0.2	+0.2
Total formal votes		60,525	95.4	−0.9
Informal votes		2,937	4.6	+0.9
Turnout		63,462	93.9	−1.3
Party total votes
Labor		31,303	51.7	+6.0
Liberal		14,358	23.7	−13.3
Greens		12,344	20.4	+10.0
Democrats		1,304	2.2	+0.5
Independent	Jane Shoebridge	375	0.6	+0.6
Group A		336	0.6	+0.6
Independent	Nigel Abbott	307	0.5	+0.5
Socialist Alliance		202	0.3	+0.3

=== Lyons ===
2002 Tasmanian state election: Lyons
Party	Candidate	Votes	%	±%
Quota		9,385		
Labor	David Llewellyn (elected 1)	11,017	19.6	+6.1
Labor	Michael Polley (elected 2)	8,585	15.2	+2.6
Labor	Ken Bacon (elected 4)	8,073	14.3	+4.2
Labor	Heather Butler	1,745	3.1	+3.1
Labor	Craig Farrell	1,316	2.3	+2.3
Liberal	Rene Hidding (elected 5)	3,958	7.0	−4.1
Liberal	Denise Swan	3,905	6.9	−0.2
Liberal	Russell Anderson	3,520	6.3	+6.3
Liberal	Stephen Wilson	2,081	3.7	+3.7
Liberal	Ray Williams	1,019	1.8	+1.8
Greens	Tim Morris (elected 3)	5,150	9.1	+9.1
Greens	Annie Willock	1,335	2.4	+2.4
Greens	Karen Cassidy	1,284	2.3	+2.3
Greens	Lesley Nicklason	1,031	1.8	+1.8
Greens	Delia Thompson	859	1.5	+1.5
Group C	John Gee	427	0.8	+0.8
Group C	Dennis Woods	171	0.3	+0.3
Group C	Andy Oliver	133	0.2	+0.2
Independent	Caroline Larner	435	0.8	+0.8
Group E	Frank Strie	222	0.4	+0.4
Group E	Ray Norman	38	0.1	+0.1
Total formal votes		56,304	94.6	−1.6
Informal votes		3,196	5.4	+1.6
Turnout		59,500	93.8	−1.7
Party total votes
Labor		30,736	54.6	+8.0
Liberal		14,483	25.7	−7.7
Greens		9,659	17.2	+7.1
Group C		731	1.3	+1.3
Independent	Caroline Larner	435	0.8	+0.8
Group E		260	0.5	+0.5

== See also ==
- 2002 Tasmanian state election
- Candidates of the 2002 Tasmanian state election
- Members of the Tasmanian House of Assembly, 2002-2006
