= Members of the Tasmanian Legislative Council, 2002–2006 =

This is a list of members of the Tasmanian Legislative Council from 2002 to 2006. Terms of the Legislative Council do not coincide with Legislative Assembly elections, with members serving eight-year terms, and two or three members facing re-election every year. The members have been categorised here according to the four-year terms of the Legislative Assembly so as to avoid the need for separate member lists for each year.

| Name | Party | Electorate | Term in office |
|---|---|---|---|
| Hon Michael Aird ^{3} | Labor Party | Derwent | 1995–2011 |
| Hon Ray Bailey ^{1} | Independent | Rosevears | 1990–2002 |
| Hon David Crean ^{4} | Australian Labor Party | Elwick | 1992–2004 |
| Ivan Dean ^{1} | Independent | Windermere | 2003–2021 |
| Hon Kerry Finch^{1} | Independent | Rosevears | 2002–2020 |
| Hon Tony Fletcher ^{3} | Independent | Murchison | 1981–2005 |
| Hon Ruth Forrest^{5} | Independent | Murchison | 2005–present |
| Hon Greg Hall | Independent | Rowallan | 2001–2018 |
| Hon Paul Harriss^{2} | Independent | Huon | 1996–2014 |
| Norma Jamieson ^{1} | Independent | Mersey | 2003–2009 |
| Hon Terry Martin ^{5} | Australian Labor Party | Elwick | 2004–2010 |
| Hon Doug Parkinson | Australian Labor Party | Wellington | 1994–2012 |
| Hon Colin Rattray ^{4} | Independent | Apsley | 1992–2004 |
| Hon Tania Rattray ^{4} | Independent | Apsley | 2004–present |
| Allison Ritchie | Australian Labor Party | Pembroke | 2001–2009 |
| Silvia Smith ^{3} | Independent Labor | Windermere | 1997–2003 |
| Hon Sue Smith^{2} | Independent | Montgomery | 1997–2013 |
| Geoff Squibb ^{3} | Independent | Mersey | 1997–2003 |
| Lin Thorp ^{5} | Australian Labor Party | Rumney | 1999–2011 |
| Hon Jim Wilkinson | Independent | Nelson | 1995–2019 |
| Hon Don Wing ^{5} | Independent | Paterson | 1982–2011 |

^{1} Independent Rosevears MLC Ray Bailey retired in 2002 at the conclusion of his term. He was replaced by another independent, Kerry Finch, at the periodic election.
^{2} The two incumbents facing re-election, Paul Harriss (Huon) and Sue Smith (Montgomery) were both returned.
^{3} Mersey MLC Geoff Squibb, Windermere MLC Silvia Smith and Derwent MLC Michael Aird faced re-election at the 2003 periodic elections. Squibb, an independent, was defeated by another independent, Norma Jamieson. Smith, an independent Labor member, was defeated by conservative independent Ivan Dean. Aird, a Labor member, was comfortably returned.
^{4} Aspley MLC Colin Rattray and Elwick MLC David Crean both retired at the 2004 periodic elections. Rattray's daughter Tania Rattray, like her father an independent, was elected in Aspley; another Labor member, Terry Martin, was elected in Elwick.
^{5} Murchison MLC Tony Fletcher, Rumney MLC Lin Thorp and Paterson MLC Don Wing faced re-election at the 2005 periodic elections. Independent MLC Fletcher retired and was succeeded by another independent, Ruth Forrest, with Wing and Thorp both re-elected.
