= Electoral results for the Division of Windermere =

This is a list of electoral results for the electoral division of Windermere in Tasmanian Legislative Council elections since 2005, when candidate political affiliations were first recorded in the official record.

== Members ==
Member	Party	Period
Silvia Smith	Independent	1999–2003
Ivan Dean	Independent	2003–2021
Nick Duigan	Liberal	2021–present

== Election results ==
=== Elections in the 2020s ===
==== 2021 ====
2021 Tasmanian Legislative Council periodic elections: Windermere
Party	Candidate	Votes	%	±%
Liberal	Nick Duigan	8,048	37.83	+37.83
Labor	Geoff Lyons	5,746	27.01	−1.52
Independent	Will Smith	4,521	21.25	+21.25
Independent	Rob Soward	2,071	9.73	+9.73
Independent	Vivienne Gale	890	4.18	+4.18
Total formal votes		21,276	95.15	+0.44
Informal votes		1,084	4.85	−0.44
Turnout		22,360	81.78	+3.17
Registered electors		27,342		
Two-party-preferred result
Liberal	Nick Duigan	11,400	54.14	+54.14
Labor	Geoff Lyons	9,658	45.86	+1.56
Liberal gain from Independent				

=== Elections in the 2010s ===
==== 2015 ====
Tasmanian Legislative Council periodic elections, 2015: Windermere
Party	Candidate	Votes	%	±%
Independent	Ivan Dean	7,650	43.96	+4.79
Labor	Jennifer Houston	4,964	28.52	+28.52
Independent	Scott McLean	2,889	16.60	+16.60
Greens	Vanessa Bleyer	1,900	10.92	−5.35
Total formal votes		17,403	94.71	−1.71
Informal votes		972	5.29	+1.71
Turnout		18,375	72.42	−8.04
Two-candidate-preferred result
Independent	Ivan Dean	9,693	55.70	+0.70
Labor	Jennifer Houston	7,710	44.30	+44.30
Independent hold		Swing	N/A	

=== Elections in the 2000s ===
==== 2009 ====
Tasmanian Legislative Council periodic elections, 2009: Windermere
Party	Candidate	Votes	%	±%
Independent	Ivan Dean	7,084	39.17	−10.96
Independent	Kathryn Hay	4,839	26.76	+26.76
Greens	Peter Whish-Wilson	2,941	16.26	+16.26
Independent	Peter Kaye	1,769	9.78	+9.78
Independent	Ted Sands	1,451	8.02	+8.02
Total formal votes		18,084	96.42	−0.38
Informal votes		672	3.58	+0.38
Turnout		18,756	80.46	−5.66
Two-party-preferred result
Independent	Ivan Dean	9,839	55.00	N/A
Independent	Kathryn Hay	8,051	45.00	N/A
Independent hold		Swing		
