= Electoral results for the Division of Prosser =

This is a list of electoral results for the electoral division of Prosser in Tasmanian Legislative Council elections since its formation in 2017.

== Members ==
Member	Party	Period
Jane Howlett	Liberal	2018–2024
Kerry Vincent	Liberal	2024-present

== Election results ==
=== Elections in the 2020s ===
==== 2024 ====
2024 Tasmanian Legislative Council periodic election: Prosser
Party	Candidate	Votes	%	±%
Liberal	Kerry Vincent	8,276	38.49	+12.36
Labor	Bryan Green	6,176	28.75	+6.83
Shooters, Fishers, Farmers	Phillip Bigg	2,664	12.40	+6.83
Independent	Pam Sharpe	2,378	11.07	+11.07
Independent	Kelly Spaulding	1,995	9.29	+7.34
Total formal votes		21,480	96.17	+1.18
Informal votes		856	3.83	–1.18
Turnout		22,336	81.46	–5.02
Registered electors		27,419		
Two-party-preferred result
Liberal	Kerry Vincent	11,186	52.93	+0.27
Labor	Bryan Green	9,949	47.07	–0.27
Liberal hold		Swing	+0.27	

=== Elections in the 2010s ===
==== 2018 ====
Tasmanian Legislative Council periodic elections, 2018: Prosser
Party	Candidate	Votes	%	±%
Liberal	Jane Howlett	5,051	26.13	N/A
Labor	Janet Lambert	4,237	21.92	N/A
Independent	Steve Mav	3,798	19.65	N/A
Independent Liberal	Tony Mulder	1,880	9.73	N/A
Shooters, Fishers, Farmers	Lorraine Bennett	1,077	5.57	N/A
Independent	Jim Playsted	969	5.01	N/A
Independent	Scott Wiggins	573	2.96	N/A
Independent	Jo Bain	417	2.16	N/A
Independent	Doug Parkinson	387	2.00	N/A
Independent	Kelly Spaulding	377	1.95	N/A
Independent	John, The Duke of Avram	254	1.31	N/A
Independent	Kim Peart	181	0.94	N/A
Tasmanians 4 Tasmania	Colin Harriss	126	0.65	N/A
Total formal votes		19,327	94.99	N/A
Informal votes		1,019	5.01	N/A
Turnout		20,346	86.48	N/A
Two-party-preferred result
Liberal	Jane Howlett	8,776	52.66	N/A
Labor	Janet Lambert	7,889	47.34	N/A
Liberal win		(new seat)		
