= Candidates of the 2002 Tasmanian state election =

The 2002 Tasmanian state election was held on 20 July 2002.

== Retiring Members ==
=== Labor ===
- Gill James MHA (Bass)
- Peter Patmore MHA (Bass)

=== Liberal ===
- Bill Bonde MHA (Braddon)
- Tony Rundle MHA (Braddon)
- Matt Smith MHA (Franklin)

== House of Assembly ==
Sitting members are shown in bold text. Tickets that elected at least one MHA are highlighted in the relevant colour. Successful candidates are indicated by an asterisk (*).

=== Bass ===
Five seats were up for election. The Labor Party was defending three seats. The Liberal Party was defending two seats.

Labor candidates	Liberal candidates	Greens candidates	Democrats candidates	TFP candidates	Socialist candidates	Ungrouped candidates
**Jim Cox***; Kathryn Hay*; Jenni Jarvis; Geoff Lyons; Brian Roe; Anita Smith	Mark Baker; Angela Davern; **David Fry**; Peter Gutwein*; **Sue Napier***	Cynthia Atherton; Kim Booth*; David Pittaway; Leyla Tas; Noah Thomas	Sancia Colgrave; Craig Cooper; Renae Cooper; Vanessa Wallace	Andrew Cowling; Merilyn Crack; Joanne Durkin	Kamala Emanuel; Sonja Montaigne	Dave Davis; Rob Larner

=== Braddon ===
Five seats were up for election. The Labor Party was defending three seats. The Liberal Party was defending two seats.

Labor candidates	Liberal candidates	Greens candidates	Group D candidates	Ungrouped candidates
**Brenton Best***; Harvey Clarke; Renai Ellings; Mike Gaffney; **Bryan Green***; **Steve Kons***	Mike Downie; Alan Pattison; Jeremy Rockliff*; Peter Upton; Brett Whiteley*	Felicity Harris; Patrick Johnson; Paul O'Halloran; Carol Jean Reilly; Clare Thompson	John Kelly; Malcolm Ryan	Gatty Burnett

=== Denison ===
Five seats were up for election. The Labor Party was defending two seats. The Liberal Party was defending two seats. The Greens were defending one seat.

Labor candidates	Liberal candidates	Greens candidates	Socialist candidates	Group E candidates
**Jim Bacon***; David Bartlett; James Crotty; **Judy Jackson***; Graeme Sturges*	**Bob Cheek**; **Michael Hodgman***; Jan Kuplis; Steve Mav; Tony Steven; Matt Woolnough	Tim Graham; Jo Hall; Mat Hines; Cath Hughes; **Peg Putt***	Alex Bainbridge; Shua Garfield	Frank Nicklason; Steve Poulton

=== Franklin ===
Five seats were up for election. The Labor Party was defending three seats. The Liberal Party was defending two seats.

Labor candidates	Liberal candidates	Greens candidates	Democrats candidates	Socialist candidates	Group A candidates	Ungrouped candidates
Carol Brown; Doug Doust; Lara Giddings*; **Paul Lennon***; **Neville Oliver**; **Paula Wriedt***	Jeff Briscoe; Anita Bromfield; Will Hodgman*; **Martin McManus**; Derek Smith	Michele Higgins; Kay McFarlane; Nick McKim*; Liz Smith; Paul Thomas	Debra Chandler; Karen Manskey; Bryan Walpole	Brian Millar; Glenn Shields	Donna Coleman; Kaye McPherson	Nigel Abbott; Jane Shoobridge

=== Lyons ===
Five seats were up for election. The Labor Party was defending three seats. The Liberal Party was defending two seats.

Labor candidates	Liberal candidates	Greens candidates	Group C candidates	Group E candidates	Ungrouped candidates
**Ken Bacon***; Heather Butler; Craig Farrell; **David Llewellyn***; **Michael Polley***	Russell Anderson; **Rene Hidding***; **Denise Swan**; Ray Williams; Stephen Wilson	Karen Cassidy; Tim Morris*; Lesley Nicklason; Delia Thompson; Annie Willock	John Gee; Andy Oliver; Dennis Woods	Ray Norman; Frank Strie	Caroline Larner

== See also ==
- Members of the Tasmanian House of Assembly, 1998–2002
- Members of the Tasmanian House of Assembly, 2002–2006
