= 2009 Tasmanian Legislative Council periodic election =

Legislative election in Tasmania, Australia

← 2008	2 May 2009	2010 →

3 of the 15 seats in the Legislative Council 8 seats needed for a majority
	First party	Second party
Party	Independent	Labor
Seats before	2	1
Seats won	2	1
Seat change	Steady	Steady

Periodic elections for the Tasmanian Legislative Council were held on 2 May 2009. The three seats up for election were Derwent, held by Labor MLC Michael Aird; Mersey, held by retiring independent MLC Norma Jamieson; and Windermere, held by independent MLC Ivan Dean. These seats were last contested in 2003.

== Derwent ==
Derwent had been held by Michael Aird for Labor since a 1995 by-election; he had previously served in the House of Assembly from 1979 to 1986 and from 1989 to 1995. A minister in Michael Field's government from 1989 to 1992, he had served as Treasurer and Minister for Racing since 2006. The Tasmanian Greens endorsed Susan Gunter, a shearer and former environmental lawyer. Independent candidate Jenny Branch, Glenorchy Alderman and President of the Tasmanian Parents and Friends Association, was a Liberal Party member but resigned from the party prior to the election.

The former federal member for Franklin, Harry Quick, initially nominated as a Greens candidate, but he withdrew his nomination.

Since Aird won a majority on the first vote, no preference count was conducted.

=== Derwent Results ===
Tasmanian Legislative Council periodic elections, 2009: Derwent
Party	Candidate	Votes	%	±%
Labor	Michael Aird	9,932	51.61	−25.67
Independent	Jenny Branch	6,438	33.46	+33.46
Greens	Susan Gunter	2,873	14.93	−7.79
Total formal votes		19,243	95.75	−2.99
Informal votes		855	4.25	+2.99
Turnout		20,098	82.06	
Labor hold		Swing		

== Mersey ==
Independent MLC for Mersey Norma Jamieson decided to retire after one term, having been first elected in 2003. Four candidates, all independents, contested the election. Mike Gaffney was a teacher and public servant who had been Mayor of Latrobe Council since 2002 and President of the Tasmanian Local Government Association since 2006. Although running as an independent, Gaffney had previously run for the Labor Party at the 2002 state election and received some support from the Labor government. Norma Jamieson's daughter Carolynn was a small business owner. Lynn Laycock had been Mayor of Devonport since 2005; she had some Liberal connections, having worked as an assistant to Liberal Premier Tony Rundle. Steve Martin was running primarily on the issue of Mersey Community Hospital, which had passed to Commonwealth control the previous year. He had previously worked for Labor MPs and was a restaurateur at the time of the election.

=== Mersey Results ===
Tasmanian Legislative Council periodic elections, 2009: Mersey
Party	Candidate	Votes	%	±%
Independent	Mike Gaffney	8,460	42.93	+42.93
Independent	Steve Martin	5,447	27.64	+12.77
Independent	Lynn Laycock	3,183	16.15	+16.15
Independent	Carolynn Jamieson	2,617	13.28	+13.28
Total formal votes		19,707	97.22	+0.00
Informal votes		564	2.88	+0.00
Turnout		20,271	86.01	−4.18
Two-party-preferred result
Independent	Mike Gaffney	11,836	60.06	+60.06
Independent	Steve Martin	7,871	39.94	+39.94
Independent hold		Swing		

== Windermere ==
Independent MLC for Windermere Ivan Dean had first been elected in 2003, when he defeated independent Labor member Silvia Smith. In 2005 he was elected as Mayor of Launceston, which attracted some criticism for holding the dual positions; Dean opted to donate his mayoral salary to charity. He lost the mayoralty in 2008 but remained a councillor; his defeat was reckoned to have something to do with his support for the Gunns pulp mill. His highest-profile challenger was Kathryn Hay, who served as Labor MHA for Bass from 2002 to 2006. Hay was running as an independent Labor candidate. The Tasmanian Greens endorsed small business owner and maritime scientist Peter Whish-Wilson. Independent Peter Kaye was a prominent local radio presenter campaigning mainly on increasing funding for Launceston General Hospital. Launceston councillor and former Labor Party member Ted Sands was also standing as an independent.

=== Windermere Results ===
Tasmanian Legislative Council periodic elections, 2009: Windermere
Party	Candidate	Votes	%	±%
Independent	Ivan Dean	7,084	39.17	−10.96
Independent	Kathryn Hay	4,839	26.76	+26.76
Greens	Peter Whish-Wilson	2,941	16.26	+16.26
Independent	Peter Kaye	1,769	9.78	+9.78
Independent	Ted Sands	1,451	8.02	+8.02
Total formal votes		18,084	96.42	−0.38
Informal votes		672	3.58	+0.38
Turnout		18,756	80.46	−5.66
Two-party-preferred result
Independent	Ivan Dean	9,839	55.00	N/A
Independent	Kathryn Hay	8,051	45.00	N/A
Independent hold		Swing		
