= 2018 Tasmanian Legislative Council periodic election =

Legislative election in Tasmania, Australia

- 5 May 2018

2 of the 15 seats in the Legislative Council 8 seats needed for a majority
	First party	Second party
Party	Independent	Liberal
Seats before	2	0
Seats won	1	1
Seat change	▼1	▲1

Periodic elections for the Tasmanian Legislative Council were held on 5 May 2018. The two seats up for elections were Hobart and Prosser. Hobart was previously contested in 2012. Prosser was a new division created in the 2017 redistribution, and was vacant pending this election.

== Hobart ==
Location of the division of Hobart in Tasmania

The seat of Hobart, based in the Tasmanian capital of Hobart, has been held by independent member Rob Valentine since 2012.

=== Hobart Results ===
Tasmanian Legislative Council periodic elections, 2018: Hobart
Party	Candidate	Votes	%	±%
Independent	Rob Valentine	8,034	43.91	N/A
Independent	Richard Griggs	4,691	25.64	N/A
Liberal	Simon Behrakis	3,485	19.05	N/A
Animal Justice	Chris Simcox	1,319	7.21	N/A
Tasmanians 4 Tasmania	Alan Barnett	413	2.26	N/A
Shooters, Fishers, Farmers	Brendon Hext	353	1.93	N/A
Total formal votes		18,295	97.07	N/A
Informal votes		553	2.93	N/A
Turnout		18,848	76.42	N/A
Two-candidate-preferred result
Independent	Rob Valentine	11,032	61.01	N/A
Independent	Richard Griggs	7,051	38.99	N/A
Independent hold		Swing	N/A	

== Prosser ==
Location of the division of Prosser in Tasmania

The east coast seat of Prosser was created in the redistribution of electoral boundaries which came into effect on 5 August 2017. No member was assigned to the seat at its creation, instead the members for the abolished divisions of Apsley (Tania Rattray) and Western Tiers (Greg Hall) were both allocated to the new McIntyre until the expiry of Hall's term at this election.

=== Prosser Results ===
Tasmanian Legislative Council periodic elections, 2018: Prosser
Party	Candidate	Votes	%	±%
Liberal	Jane Howlett	5,051	26.13	N/A
Labor	Janet Lambert	4,237	21.92	N/A
Independent	Steve Mav	3,798	19.65	N/A
Independent Liberal	Tony Mulder	1,880	9.73	N/A
Shooters, Fishers, Farmers	Lorraine Bennett	1,077	5.57	N/A
Independent	Jim Playsted	969	5.01	N/A
Independent	Scott Wiggins	573	2.96	N/A
Independent	Jo Bain	417	2.16	N/A
Independent	Doug Parkinson	387	2.00	N/A
Independent	Kelly Spaulding	377	1.95	N/A
Independent	John, The Duke of Avram	254	1.31	N/A
Independent	Kim Peart	181	0.94	N/A
Tasmanians 4 Tasmania	Colin Harriss	126	0.65	N/A
Total formal votes		19,327	94.99	N/A
Informal votes		1,019	5.01	N/A
Turnout		20,346	86.48	N/A
Two-party-preferred result
Liberal	Jane Howlett	8,776	52.66	N/A
Labor	Janet Lambert	7,889	47.34	N/A
Liberal win		(new seat)		
