= Results of the 2014 Tasmanian state election =

Tasmanian state election, 15 March 2014 House of Assembly << 2010–2018 >>
Enrolled voters	366,442				
Votes cast	346,423		Turnout	94.54	+0.68
Informal votes	16,432		Informal	4.74	+0.30
Summary of votes by party
Party	Primary votes	%	Swing	Seats	Change
Liberal	167,051	51.22	+12.23	15	+5
Labor	89,130	27.33	−9.55	7	−3
Greens	45,098	13.83	−7.78	3	−2
Palmer United	16,198	4.97	+4.97	0	0
National	2,655	0.81	+0.81	0	0
Christians	1,215	0.37	+0.37	0	0
Socialist Alliance	664	0.20	+0.00	0	0
Independent	4,152	1.27	−1.05	0	0
Total	326,163			25	

This is a list of House of Assembly results for the 2014 Tasmanian election.

== Results by Division ==
=== Bass ===
2014 Tasmanian state election: Bass
Party	Candidate	Votes	%	±%
Quota		10,744		
Liberal	Peter Gutwein (elected 1)	15,041	23.3	+9.1
Liberal	Michael Ferguson (elected 2)	14,418	22.4	−2.6
Liberal	Sarah Courtney (elected 3)	3,046	4.7	+4.7
Liberal	Barry Jarvis	2,582	4.0	+4.0
Liberal	Leonie McNair	1,795	2.8	+2.8
Labor	Michelle O'Byrne (elected 4)	6,852	10.6	−7.6
Labor	Brian Wightman	5,268	8.1	+3.1
Labor	Senka Mujkic	1,183	1.8	+1.8
Labor	Andrew Connor	1,007	1.6	+1.6
Labor	Adam Gore	692	1.1	+1.1
Greens	Kim Booth (elected 5)	6,661	10.3	−3.6
Greens	Andrea Dawkins	467	0.7	+0.7
Greens	Amy Tyler	369	0.6	+0.6
Greens	Anna Povey	366	0.6	+0.6
Greens	Anne Layton-Bennett	334	0.5	+0.5
Palmer United	Tim Parish	1,147	1.8	+1.8
Palmer United	Chris Dobson	910	1.4	+1.4
Palmer United	Mark Hines	672	1.0	+1.0
Palmer United	Brian Gunst	579	0.9	+0.9
Christians	Ray Kroeze	680	1.1	+1.1
Independent	Andrew Roberts	223	0.3	+0.3
Independent	Brett Lucas	167	0.3	+0.3
Total formal votes		64,459	95.4	+0.1
Informal votes		3,130	4.6	−0.1
Turnout		67,589	92.9	−0.9
Party total votes
Liberal		36,882	57.2	+14.6
Labor		15,002	23.3	−11.2
Greens		8,197	12.7	−8.3
Palmer United		3,308	5.1	+5.1
Christians		680	1.1	+1.1
Independent	Andrew Roberts	223	0.3	+0.3
Independent	Brett Lucas	167	0.3	+0.3
Liberal hold		Swing	+9.1	
Liberal hold		Swing	–2.6	
Liberal gain from Labor		Swing	+4.7	
Labor hold		Swing	–7.6	
Greens hold		Swing	–3.6	

=== Braddon ===
2014 Tasmanian state election: Braddon
Party	Candidate	Votes	%	±%
Quota		10,716		
Liberal	Adam Brooks (elected 1)	16,073	25.0	+14.2
Liberal	Jeremy Rockliff (elected 2)	15,168	23.6	+6.5
Liberal	Roger Jaensch (elected 4)	3,009	4.7	+4.7
Liberal	Joan Rylah (elected 5)	2,633	4.1	+4.1
Liberal	Kyron Howell	895	1.4	+1.4
Labor	Bryan Green (elected 3)	6,606	10.3	−7.1
Labor	Brenton Best	3,648	5.7	−5.3
Labor	Shane Broad	2,654	4.1	−1.0
Labor	Justine Keay	1,382	2.1	+2.1
Labor	Darryl Bessell	653	1.0	+1.0
Palmer United	Kevin Morgan	2,291	3.6	+3.6
Palmer United	Steve Green	847	1.3	+1.3
Palmer United	Kev Deakin	539	0.8	+0.8
Palmer United	Scott Alexander	533	0.8	+0.8
Palmer United	Julian Brown	404	0.6	+0.6
Greens	Paul O'Halloran	3,294	5.1	−3.8
Greens	Melissa Houghton	409	0.6	−0.5
Greens	Philip Nicholas	314	0.5	+0.5
Greens	Sally O'Wheel	253	0.4	+0.4
Greens	Chris Cornell	249	0.4	+0.4
National	Ken Dorsey	747	1.2	+1.2
National	Benji Benjamin	507	0.8	+0.8
National	Liz van der Linde-Keep	135	0.2	+0.2
Christians	Kevin Swarts	535	0.8	+0.8
Independent	Mick Anderson	412	0.6	+0.6
Independent	Tony Brown	101	0.2	+0.2
Total formal votes		64,291	94.9	−0.2
Informal votes		3,466	5.1	+0.2
Turnout		67,757	93.8	−0.3
Party total votes
Liberal		37,778	58.8	+13.6
Labor		14,943	23.2	−17.0
Palmer United		4,614	7.2	+7.2
Greens		4,519	7.0	−6.8
National		1,389	2.2	+2.2
Christians		535	0.8	+0.8
Independent	Mick Anderson	412	0.6	+0.6
Independent	Tony Brown	101	0.2	+0.2
Liberal hold		Swing	+14.2	
Liberal hold		Swing	+6.5	
Liberal gain from Labor		Swing	+4.7	
Liberal gain from Greens		Swing	+4.1	
Labor hold		Swing	–7.1	

=== Denison ===
2014 Tasmanian state election: Denison
Party	Candidate	Votes	%	±%
Quota		10,660		
Liberal	Matthew Groom (elected 2)	13,829	21.6	+6.5
Liberal	Elise Archer (elected 4)	6,701	10.5	+5.8
Liberal	Robert Mallett	2,080	3.3	+3.3
Liberal	Deborah De Williams	1,052	1.6	+1.6
Liberal	René Kling	823	1.3	+1.3
Labor	Scott Bacon (elected 1)	14,469	22.6	+11.1
Labor	Madeleine Ogilvie (elected 5)	2,156	3.4	+2.4
Labor	Julian Amos	1,917	3.0	+3.0
Labor	Alphonse Mulumba	1,587	2.5	+2.5
Labor	Sharon Carnes	1,482	2.3	+2.3
Greens	Cassy O'Connor (elected 3)	9,694	15.2	−1.0
Greens	Bill Harvey	1,614	2.5	+2.5
Greens	Penelope Ann	934	1.5	+0.2
Greens	Philip Cocker	695	1.1	+1.1
Greens	Alan Whykes	615	1.0	+1.0
Palmer United	Barbara Etter	737	1.2	+1.2
Palmer United	Rob Newitt	369	0.6	+0.6
Palmer United	Justin Stringer	357	0.6	+0.6
Palmer United	Charles Forrest	303	0.5	+0.5
Palmer United	Mark Grube	254	0.4	+0.4
Independent	Marti Zucco	788	1.2	+1.2
Independent	Hans Willink	413	0.6	+0.6
Socialist Alliance	Shaine Stephen	300	0.5	+0.5
Independent	Leo Foley	207	0.3	+0.3
National	Vlad Gala	75	0.1	+0.1
National	Julian Edwards	61	0.1	+0.1
National	Domenic Allocca	48	0.1	+0.1
Independent	Freddy Hill	152	0.2	+0.2
Independent	Lucas Noyes	130	0.2	+0.2
Independent	Michael Swanton	114	0.2	+0.2
Total formal votes		63,956	95.2	−1.0
Informal votes		3,218	4.8	+1.0
Turnout		67,174	92.7	−0.3
Party total votes
Liberal		24,485	38.3	+8.5
Labor		21,611	33.8	−2.5
Greens		13,552	21.2	−3.7
Palmer United		2,020	3.2	+3.2
Independent	Marti Zucco	788	1.2	+1.2
Independent	Hans Willink	413	0.6	+0.6
Socialist Alliance		300	0.5	−0.1
Independent	Leo Foley	207	0.3	+0.3
National		184	0.3	+0.3
Independent	Freddy Hill	152	0.2	+0.2
Independent	Lucas Noyes	130	0.2	+0.2
Independent	Michael Swanton	114	0.2	+0.2
Liberal hold		Swing	+6.5	
Liberal hold		Swing	+5.8	
Labor hold		Swing	+11.1	
Labor hold		Swing	+2.4	
Greens hold		Swing	–1.0	

=== Franklin ===
2014 Tasmanian state election: Franklin
Party	Candidate	Votes	%	±%
Quota		11,184		
Liberal	Will Hodgman (elected 1)	23,589	35.2	+3.5
Liberal	Jacquie Petrusma (elected 2)	4,463	6.7	+2.8
Liberal	Paul Harriss (elected 5)	3,646	5.4	+5.4
Liberal	Nic Street	1,122	1.7	+1.7
Liberal	Sue Bastone	623	0.9	+0.9
Labor	Lara Giddings (elected 3)	11,035	16.4	+1.3
Labor	David O'Byrne	5,620	8.4	+0.8
Labor	Julie Dick	1,372	2.0	+2.0
Labor	Heather Chong	760	1.1	+1.1
Labor	Russell Mitchell	413	0.6	+0.6
Greens	Nick McKim (elected 4)	9,013	13.4	−10.7
Greens	Rosalie Woodruff	1,110	1.7	+1.7
Greens	Simon Burnett	454	0.7	+0.7
Greens	Zoe Kean	354	0.5	+0.5
Greens	Richard Atkinson	334	0.5	+0.5
Palmer United	Debra Thurley	743	1.1	+1.1
Palmer United	John Peers	631	0.9	+0.9
Palmer United	Michael Figg	413	0.6	+0.6
Palmer United	Con Spiliopoulous	391	0.6	+0.6
Palmer United	Luke Rutherford	320	0.5	+0.5
Socialist Alliance	Jenny Forward	364	0.5	+0.1
National	Matt Holloway	174	0.3	+0.3
National	Penny Lane	97	0.1	+0.1
National	Myrtle Wakeling	62	0.1	0.1
Total formal votes		67,103	96.0	+0.2
Informal votes		2,790	4.0	−0.2
Turnout		69,893	94.2	−0.5
Party total votes
Liberal		33,443	49.8	+8.6
Labor		19,200	28.6	−1.9
Greens		11,265	16.8	−10.6
Palmer United		2,498	3.7	+3.7
Socialist Alliance		364	0.5	+0.1
National		333	0.5	+0.5
Liberal hold		Swing	+3.5	
Liberal hold		Swing	+2.8	
Liberal gain from Labor		Swing	+5.4	
Labor hold		Swing	+1.3	
Greens hold		Swing	−10.7	

=== Lyons ===
2014 Tasmanian state election: Lyons
Party	Candidate	Votes	%	±%
Quota		11,060		
Liberal	Rene Hidding (elected 1)	11,097	16.7	+4.9
Liberal	Guy Barnett (elected 2)	9,741	14.7	+14.7
Liberal	Mark Shelton (elected 4)	8,060	12.1	+3.9
Liberal	Martyn Evans	3,005	4.5	+4.5
Liberal	Bertrand Cadart	2,560	3.9	+3.9
Labor	Rebecca White (elected 3)	8,589	12.9	+2.9
Labor	David Llewellyn (elected 5)	5,262	7.9	−2.4
Labor	Bob Gordon	2,724	4.1	+4.1
Labor	Darren Clark	1,080	1.6	+1.6
Labor	Jessey Dillon	719	1.1	+1.1
Greens	Tim Morris	5,140	7.7	−6.4
Greens	Hannah Rubenach	668	1.0	+1.0
Greens	Pip Brinklow	655	1.0	+1.0
Greens	Stephanie Taylor	604	0.9	+0.9
Greens	Glenn Millar	498	0.8	+0.8
Palmer United	Quentin Von Stieglitz	1,658	2.5	+2.5
Palmer United	Wayne Shoobridge	1,233	1.9	+1.9
Palmer United	Mark Grewar	867	1.3	+1.3
Independent	Paul Belcher	1,252	1.9	+1.9
National	Craig Davey	295	0.4	+0.4
National	Brett Hall	243	0.4	+0.4
National	Anne Salt	122	0.2	+0.2
National	Leo Perotti	89	0.1	+0.1
Independent	Murray Stewart	193	0.3	+0.3
Total formal votes		66,354	94.5	−0.5
Informal votes		3,828	5.5	+0.5
Turnout		70,182	93.8	+0.1
Party total votes
Liberal		34,463	51.9	+15.8
Labor		18,374	27.7	−15.1
Greens		7,565	11.4	−9.7
Palmer United		3,758	5.7	+5.7
Independent	Paul Belcher	1,252	1.9	+1.9
National		749	1.1	+1.1
Independent	Murray Stewart	193	0.3	+0.3
Liberal hold		Swing	+4.9	
Liberal hold		Swing	+14.7	
Liberal gain from Greens		Swing	+3.9	
Labor hold		Swing	+2.9	
Labor hold		Swing	–2.4	

== See also ==
- 2014 Tasmanian state election
- Candidates of the 2014 Tasmanian state election
- Members of the Tasmanian House of Assembly, 2014–2018
