= Members of the Tasmanian House of Assembly, 2002–2006 =

This is a list of members of the Tasmanian House of Assembly, elected at the 2002 state election:

Name	Party	Electorate	Years in office
Hon Jim Bacon^{[1]}	Labor	Denison	1996–2004
Hon Ken Bacon^{[2]}	Labor	Lyons	1998–2005
David Bartlett^{[1]}	Labor	Denison	2004–2011
Brenton Best	Labor	Braddon	1996–2014
Kim Booth	Greens	Bass	2002–2015
Heather Butler^{[2]}	Labor	Lyons	2005–2010
Hon Jim Cox	Labor	Bass	1989–1992, 1996–2010
Hon Lara Giddings	Labor	Franklin	1996–1998, 2002–2018
Hon Bryan Green	Labor	Braddon	1998–2017
Peter Gutwein	Liberal	Bass	2002–2022
Kathryn Hay	Labor	Bass	2002–2006
Hon Rene Hidding	Liberal	Lyons	1996–2019
Hon Michael Hodgman	Liberal	Denison	1992–1998, 2001–2010
Will Hodgman	Liberal	Franklin	2002–2020
Hon Judy Jackson	Labor	Denison	1986–2006
Hon Steve Kons	Labor	Braddon	1998–2010
Hon Paul Lennon	Labor	Franklin	1990–2008
Hon David Llewellyn	Labor	Lyons	1986–2010, 2014–2018
Nick McKim	Greens	Franklin	2002–2015
Tim Morris	Greens	Lyons	2002–2014
Hon Sue Napier	Liberal	Bass	1992–2010
Hon Michael Polley	Labor	Lyons	1972–2014
Peg Putt	Greens	Denison	1993–2008
Jeremy Rockliff	Liberal	Braddon	2002–present
Graeme Sturges	Labor	Denison	2002–2010, 2011–2014
Brett Whiteley	Liberal	Braddon	2002–2010
Hon Paula Wriedt	Labor	Franklin	1996–2009

^{1} Labor MHA for Denison, Jim Bacon, resigned on 23 February 2004. David Bartlett was elected as his replacement on 1 April 2004.
^{2} Labor MHA for Lyons, Ken Bacon, resigned on 29 April 2005. Heather Butler was elected as his replacement on 10 May 2004.

== Distribution of seats ==
Electorate	Seats held
Bass	
Braddon	
Denison	
Franklin	
Lyons	

Australian Labor Party – 14 seats (56%)
Liberal Party of Australia – 7 seats (28%)
Tasmanian Greens – 4 seats (16%)

== See also ==
- List of past members of the Tasmanian House of Assembly
