= 2015 Tasmanian Legislative Council periodic election =

Legislative election in Tasmania, Australia

- 2 May 2015

3 of the 15 seats in the Legislative Council 8 seats needed for a majority
	First party	Second party
Party	Independent	Labor
Seats before	2	1
Seats won	2	1
Seat change	Steady	Steady

Periodic elections for the Tasmanian Legislative Council were held on 2 May 2015. The three seats up for election were the electoral division of Derwent, the electoral division of Mersey and the electoral division of Windermere. Mersey and Windermere were previously contested in 2009, with Derwent contested in a by-election in 2011.

All three seats were retained by the incumbent members.

== Derwent ==
Derwent has been held by Craig Farrell since 2011. At the time of these elections, Farrell was the sole Labor Party member of the Legislative Council. Farrell re-contested the seat against Alan Baker, an IT consultant from New Norfolk.

=== Derwent Results ===
Tasmanian Legislative Council periodic elections, 2015: Derwent
Party	Candidate	Votes	%	±%
Labor	Craig Farrell	12,492	64.34	+25.74
Independent	Alan Baker	6,923	35.66	+35.66
Total formal votes		19,415	93.80	+0.49
Informal votes		1,283	6.20	−0.49
Turnout		20,698	80.18	−4.49
Labor hold		Swing	N/A	

== Mersey ==
Mersey has been held by independent MLC Mike Gaffney since 2009. Gaffney re-contested the seat against Vivienne Gale, a businesswoman from Launceston, who stated she would move to Devonport in the electorate if elected.

=== Mersey Results ===
Tasmanian Legislative Council periodic elections, 2015: Mersey
Party	Candidate	Votes	%	±%
Independent	Mike Gaffney	14,690	75.30	+32.37
Independent	Vivienne Gale	4,818	24.70	+24.70
Total formal votes		19,508	96.36	−0.86
Informal votes		737	3.64	+0.86
Turnout		20,245	84.86	−1.15
Independent hold		Swing	N/A	

== Windermere ==
Windermere has been held by independent MLC Ivan Dean since 2003. Dean re-contested the seat against Vanessa Bleyer (for the Tasmanian Greens), Jennifer Houston (for the Labor Party) and former union official Scott McLean (independent).

=== Windermere Results ===
Tasmanian Legislative Council periodic elections, 2015: Windermere
Party	Candidate	Votes	%	±%
Independent	Ivan Dean	7,650	43.96	+4.79
Labor	Jennifer Houston	4,964	28.52	+28.52
Independent	Scott McLean	2,889	16.60	+16.60
Greens	Vanessa Bleyer	1,900	10.92	−5.35
Total formal votes		17,403	94.71	−1.71
Informal votes		972	5.29	+1.71
Turnout		18,375	72.42	−8.04
Two-candidate-preferred result
Independent	Ivan Dean	9,693	55.70	+0.70
Labor	Jennifer Houston	7,710	44.30	+44.30
Independent hold		Swing	N/A	
