= Electoral division of McIntyre =

Tasmanian Legislative Council electoral division

McIntyre Tasmania—Legislative Council
- Map showing the electoral division of McIntyre, as of the 2017 periodic review.
- State: Tasmania
- Created: 2017
- MP: Tania Rattray
- Party: Independent
- Namesake: Margaret McIntyre
- Electors: 27,264 (2017)
- Area: 15,339 km^{2} (5,922.4 sq mi)
- Demographic: Rural
- Federal electorate(s): Bass; Lyons
- Coordinates: 41.277°S 147.502°E
Electorates around McIntyre:
Mersey; Rosevears; Montgomery	Bass Strait; Windermere; Launceston	Bass Strait
Murchison	McIntyre	Tasman Sea
Murchison	Derwent	Prosser

The electoral division of McIntyre is one of the fifteen electorates in the Tasmanian Legislative Council, it includes Flinders Island, the northern east coast of Tasmania, and regional areas south and west of Launceston. It is named after Margaret McIntyre, who was the first woman to be elected into the Parliament of Tasmania in 1948.

There were temporarily two representatives for the single-member division of McIntyre until 2018. The next scheduled periodic election will be held in 2028.

== History and electoral profile ==
The division was created following the 2016–17 Legislative Council redistribution process. The new name of McIntyre was adopted to avoid confusion because of the significant changes made to the electoral boundaries in the region.

McIntyre includes all of the Flinders, Dorset, Break O'Day municipal areas and part of Kentish, Meander Valley and Northern Midlands municipal areas.

== Members ==
As a result of the changes made following the 2016–17 Legislative Council redistribution process, the single-seat electorate of McIntyre was temporarily assigned two MLCs, Greg Hall and Tania Rattray, until the expiration of Hall's term in 2018. The expiration of Hall's term coincided with the 2018 periodic elections where a member for the new division of Prosser was elected.

Member	Party	Period
Greg Hall	Independent	2017–2018
Tania Rattray	Independent	2017–present

== Election results ==
2022 Tasmanian Legislative Council periodic elections: McIntyre
Party	Candidate	Votes	%	±%
Independent	Tania Rattray	13,568	57.67	+7.81
Independent	David Downie	6,391	27.17	+27.17
Greens	Mitchell Houghton	3,566	15.16	+6.34
Total formal votes		23,525	96.44	
Informal votes		869	3.56	
Turnout		24,394	83.00	
Registered electors		29,391		
Independent hold		Swing		

== See also ==
- Tasmanian House of Assembly
- Electoral division of Apsley (former electorate)
- Electoral division of Western Tiers (former electorate)
