= Electoral division of Prosser =

Tasmanian Legislative Council electoral division

Prosser Tasmania—Legislative Council
- Map showing the electoral division of Prosser, as of the 2017 periodic review.
- State: Tasmania
- Created: 2017 (Members first elected in 2018)
- MP: Kerry Vincent
- Party: Liberal
- Namesake: Prosser River
- Electors: 23,790 (2019)
- Area: 8,593 km^{2} (3,317.8 sq mi)
- Demographic: Rural
- Federal electorate: Lyons
- Coordinates: 42.36°S 147.661°E
Electorates around Prosser:
McIntyre	McIntyre	Tasman Sea
Derwent	Prosser	Tasman Sea
Derwent	Rumney; Storm Bay	Tasman Sea

The electoral division of Prosser is one of the fifteen electorates in the Tasmanian Legislative Council, it includes the south-east coast of Tasmania, the Sorell township and the Tasman Peninsula. Prosser is named after the Prosser River, which flows through the centre of the division.

== History and electoral profile ==
The division was created following the 2016–17 Legislative Council redistribution process. The new name of Prosser was adopted to avoid confusion because of the significant changes made to the electoral boundaries in the region.

Prosser includes all of the Glamorgan Spring Bay and Tasman municipal areas and parts of the municipal areas of the Northern Midlands, Southern Midlands, Brighton and Sorell. The electorate covers most of the rural south eastern corner of Tasmania.

== Members ==
As a result of the changes made following the 2016–17 Legislative Council redistribution process, the single-seat electorate of McIntyre was temporarily assigned two MLCs, Greg Hall and Tania Rattray, until the expiration of Hall's term in 2018. The expiration of Hall's term coincided with the 2018 periodic elections where a member for new division of Prosser was elected. On 15 May 2018, the Tasmanian Electoral Commission declared Jane Howlett to be elected as the member for Prosser until 2024.

Member	Party	Period
Vacant during transition	—N/a	2017–2018
Jane Howlett	Liberal	2018–2024
Kerry Vincent	Liberal	2024-present

== Election results ==
2024 Tasmanian Legislative Council periodic election: Prosser
Party	Candidate	Votes	%	±%
Liberal	Kerry Vincent	8,276	38.49	+12.36
Labor	Bryan Green	6,176	28.75	+6.83
Shooters, Fishers, Farmers	Phillip Bigg	2,664	12.40	+6.83
Independent	Pam Sharpe	2,378	11.07	+11.07
Independent	Kelly Spaulding	1,995	9.29	+7.34
Total formal votes		21,480	96.17	+1.18
Informal votes		856	3.83	–1.18
Turnout		22,336	81.46	–5.02
Registered electors		27,419		
Two-party-preferred result
Liberal	Kerry Vincent	11,186	52.93	+0.27
Labor	Bryan Green	9,949	47.07	–0.27
Liberal hold		Swing	+0.27	

== See also ==
- Tasmanian House of Assembly
- Electoral division of Apsley (former electorate)
- Electoral division of Western Tiers (former electorate)
