= Vanessa Bleyer =

Australian politician

Senator Vanessa Bleyer
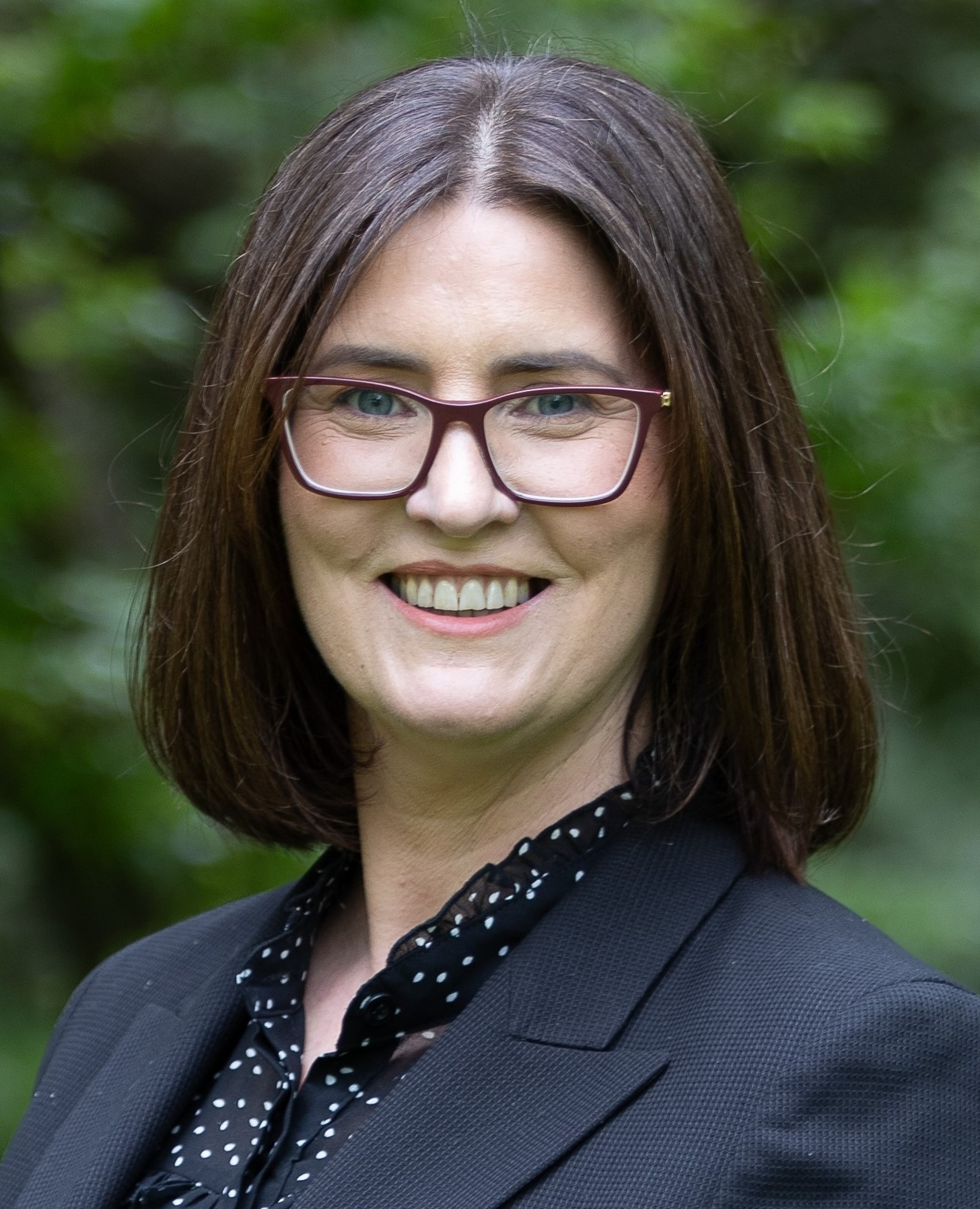

Senator for Tasmania
- Incumbent
- Assumed office 20 August 2026
- Preceded by: Peter Whish-Wilson

Personal details
- Born: 22 July 1975 (age 51) Auckland, New Zealand
- Citizenship: New Zealand (1975–2021); Austria (1975–2000); Australia (from 2000)
- Party: Greens
- Profession: Environmental lawyer
- Website: greens.org.au/tas/person/vanessa-bleyer

Vanessa Elizabeth Bleyer (/ˈblaɪər/ BLIRE; born 22 July 1975) is an Australian politician and a Senator for Tasmania representing the Greens since 2026. She replaced Peter Whish-Wilson in the Senate following his retirement from politics.

== Pre-political career ==
Before her appointment to the Senate, Bleyer worked as an environmental lawyer. She served as president of Lawyers for Forests from 2003 to 2007, as chair of Environment Tasmania from 2012 to 2015, and as native forests spokesperson for the Australia Institute from 2023 to 2024.

== Politics ==
Bleyer has run for the Greens at a number of elections at state and federal level. In 2015, she ran for Windermere in the state upper house. She then ran as the Greens' second Senate candidate in 2022 and 2025, behind successfully elected candidates Peter Whish-Wilson and Nick McKim respectively. At the 2025 state election, she was the party's lead candidate in Braddon. She was not successful in any of these elections. She also stood in 2015 as a candidate in the Greens' internal preselection for Christine Milne's successor in the Senate, a contest won by McKim.

In April 2026, it was announced that Bleyer had won a preselection to succeed Whish-Wilson in the Senate, who had announced his retirement. She received 42.25% of the vote in a contest against three other candidates including state MP Tabatha Badger. On 20 August 2026, she was appointed to the Senate by a joint sitting of the Parliament of Tasmania. She will serve the remainder of Whish-Wilson's term which will expire in 2028.

In the 2026 Australian Greens leadership election, Bleyer ran for Deputy Leader of the Greens. She placed second with 3 votes in the first round, and 5 votes in the second, losing to Steph Hodgins-May She also ran for Greens Deputy Whip, losing 7-4 to Penny Allman-Payne.

== Personal life ==
Bleyer's father was businessman Roland Bleyer. When Vanessa was 14, Roland left Australia and did not return for a number of years. This left Bleyer's family unable to pay their bills and resulted in them being evicted from their home.

Bleyer lives in West Launceston.
