= 2006 Tasmanian Legislative Council periodic election =

Legislative election in Tasmania, Australia

- 6 May 2006

2 of the 15 seats in the Legislative Council 8 seats needed for a majority
	First party	Second party
Party	Independent	Labor
Seats before	1	1
Seats won	1	1
Seat change	Steady	Steady

Periodic elections for the Tasmanian Legislative Council were held on 6 May 2006. The two seats up for election were Rowallan, held by independent MLC Greg Hall, and Wellington, held by Labor MLC Doug Parkinson. Rowallan was last contested in 2001, while Wellington was last contested in 2000.

== Rowallan ==
Rowallan had been held since 2001 by independent MLC Greg Hall. His sole opponent was Karen Cassidy of the Tasmanian Greens.

=== Rowallan Results ===
Tasmanian Legislative Council periodic elections, 2006: Rowallan
Party	Candidate	Votes	%	±%
Independent	Greg Hall	13,862	81.95	+50.14
Greens	Karen Cassidy	3,053	18.05	+18.05
Total formal votes		16,915	94.56	+0.33
Informal votes		974	5.44	−0.33
Turnout		17,889	83.16	−5.60
Independent hold		Swing	+28.09	

== Wellington ==
Labor MLC Doug Parkinson first entered the Legislative Council as the member for Hobart in 1994. He successfully transferred to Wellington in 2000. In the leadup to the election there was speculation that the Tasmanian Greens were close to winning the seat; their candidate was Marrette Corby. The other candidates all appeared on the ballot as independents. Michael Fracalossi was a member of the Christian Democratic Party. Marti Zucco was a Hobart City Council alderman. The other independents were Stephen Roomes and Paul Hiscutt.

=== Wellington Results ===
Tasmanian Legislative Council periodic elections, 2006: Wellington
Party	Candidate	Votes	%	±%
Labor	Doug Parkinson	7,309	43.10	−3.25
Greens	Marrette Corby	4,455	26.27	−1.71
Independent	Marti Zucco	2,442	14.40	+14.40
Independent	Paul Hiscutt	1,386	8.17	+8.17
Independent	Michael Fracalossi	888	5.24	+5.24
Independent	Stephen Roomes	477	2.81	+2.81
Total formal votes		16,957	96.46	+1.34
Informal votes		622	3.54	−1.34
Turnout		17,579	75.34	−3.39
Two-party-preferred result
Labor	Doug Parkinson	10,309	62.65	+3.18
Greens	Marrette Corby	6,146	37.35	−3.18
Labor hold		Swing	+3.18	
