= 2014 Tasmanian state election =

State election in Australia

- 15 March 2014

All 25 seats in the House of Assembly 13 seats needed for a majority
- Turnout: 93.49% (▼0.36pp)
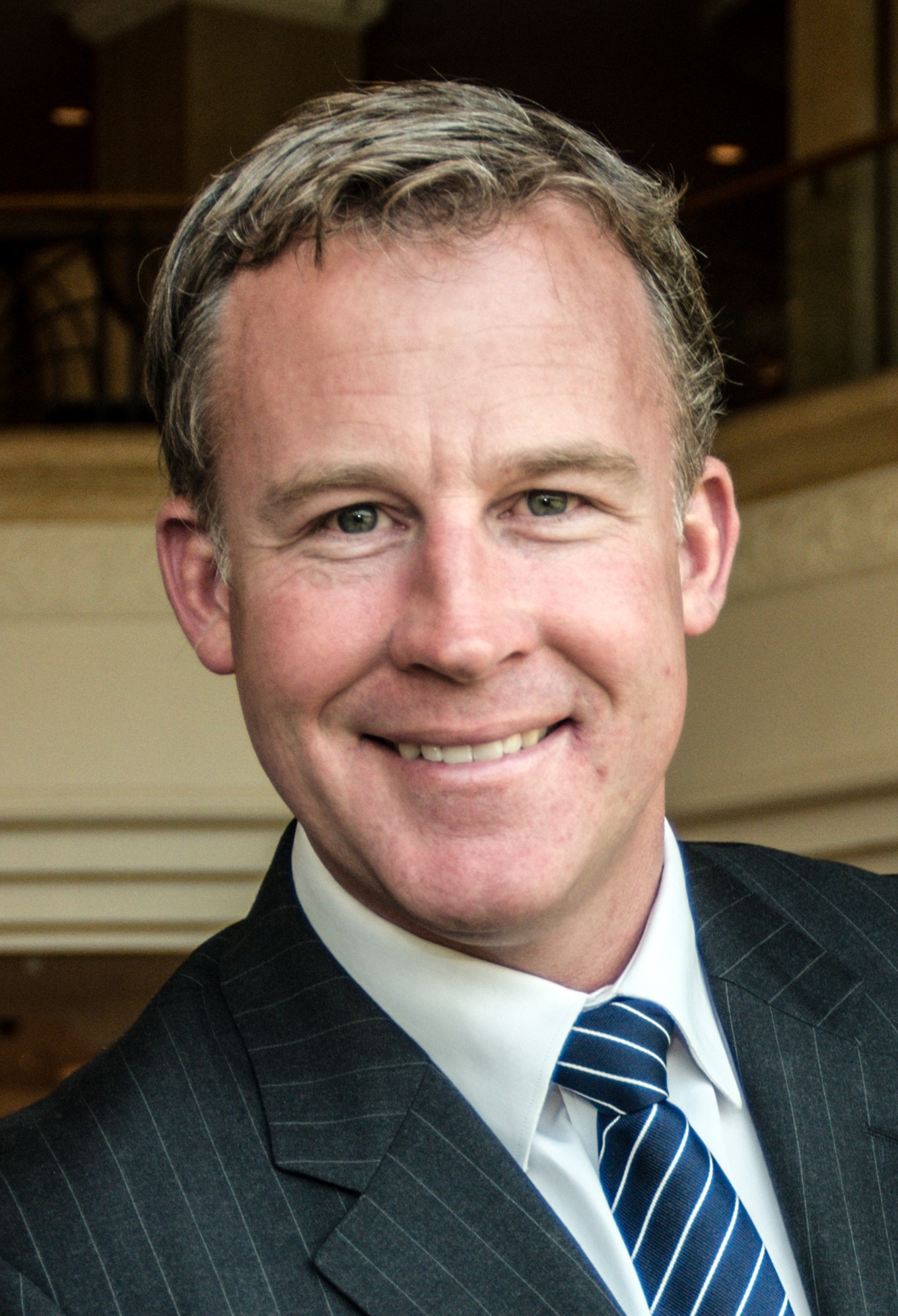

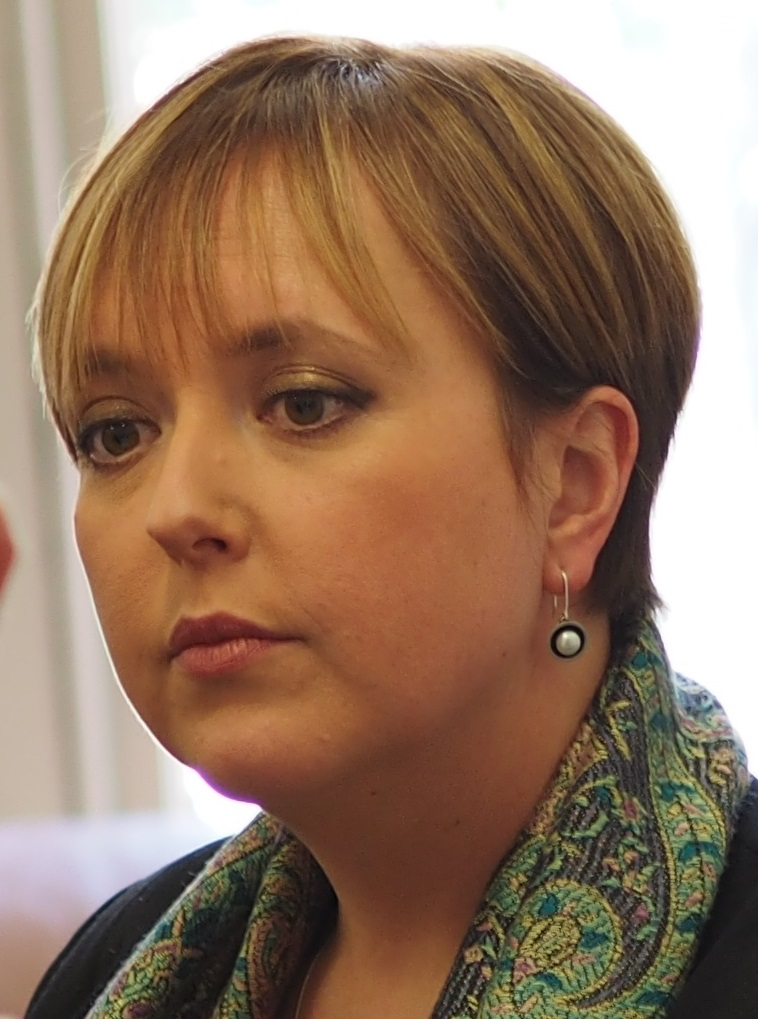

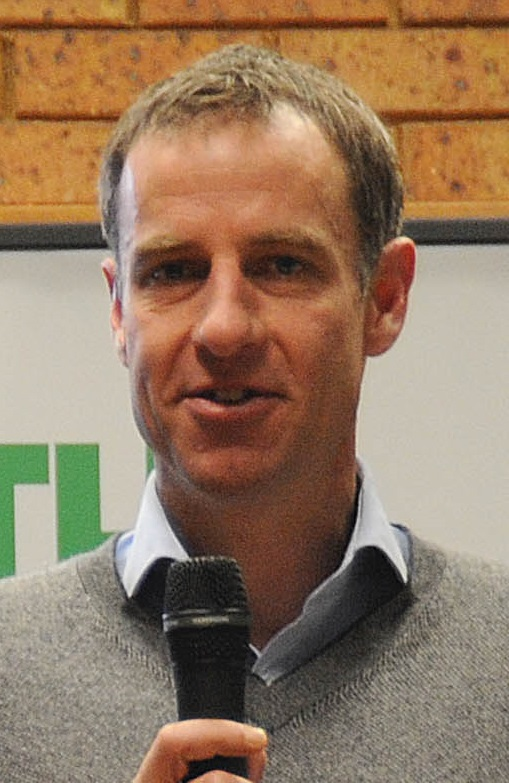
	First party	Second party	Third party
Leader	Will Hodgman	Lara Giddings	Nick McKim
Party	Liberal	Labor	Greens
Leader since	30 March 2006	24 January 2011	7 July 2008
Leader's seat	Franklin	Franklin	Franklin
Last election	10 seats; 38.99%	10 seats; 36.88%	5 seats; 21.61%
Seats won	15	7	3
Seat change	▲5	▼3	▼2
Popular vote	167,051	89,130	45,098
Percentage	51.22%	27.33%	13.83%
Swing	▲12.23pp	▼9.55pp	▼7.78pp
- Results of the election
Premier before election
Lara Giddings
Labor
Elected Premier
Will Hodgman
Liberal

The 2014 Tasmanian state election was held on 15 March 2014 to elect all 25 members to the House of Assembly. The 16-year incumbent Labor government, led by the Premier of Tasmania Lara Giddings, sought to win a fifth consecutive term in government, but was defeated by the Liberal opposition, led by Opposition Leader Will Hodgman, in a landslide victory. Also contesting the election was the Greens led by Nick McKim. The Palmer United Party made a significant effort in the election.

The House of Assembly uses the proportional Hare-Clark system to elect 25 members in five constituencies electing five members each. Elections to the Legislative Council are conducted separately from House of Assembly elections. The election was conducted by the Tasmanian Electoral Commission.

Before the election, Hodgman had indicated that he would only govern in majority. ABC News election analyst Antony Green suggested Hodgman's promise could have come back to haunt him if Palmer United were to siphon off enough votes to deny the Liberals enough seats for a majority in their own right. However, this became moot after the Liberals picked up an additional seat in every electorate except Denison, assuring Hodgman of a secure majority. By 10:00 pm on election night, with the Liberals assured of winning at least 14 seats, Giddings conceded defeat on behalf of Labor. Ultimately, the Liberals won 15 seats, a decisive majority. Although the Liberals won just two more seats than necessary for a majority, it was considered a comprehensive victory under Tasmanian electoral practice of the time.

Hodgman took office on 31 March 2014, becoming only the fifth non-Labor premier in 80 years and only the third to govern in majority.

Later, Giddings resigned as Labor party leader, and was succeeded by outgoing Deputy Premier Bryan Green on 31 March 2014.

== Date ==
Under section 23 of the Constitution Act 1934, the House of Assembly expires four years from the return of the writs for its election, in this case 7 April 2010. The Governor must issue writs of election between five and ten days thereafter. Nominations must close on a date seven to 21 days after the issuance of the writ, and polling day must be a Saturday between 15 and 30 days after nominations close, making the last possible date 7 June 2014.

On 16 January 2014, Premier Lara Giddings announced she would recall Parliament for a single session on 28 January for the sole purpose of ensuring the validity of permits for the Bell Bay Pulp Mill. She said that once the legislation was passed, she would ask the Governor of Tasmania to prorogue the parliament and issue writs for an election to be held on 15 March. Giddings announced that Greens Nick McKim and Cassy O'Connor would be expelled from cabinet as of 17 January, that the power sharing arrangement between Labor and the Greens was over, and that Labor would no longer govern with Greens in cabinet.

The 2014 South Australian state election occurred on the same day for the third time in a row.

== Background ==
The results from the previous election saw a tie between the two major parties, who both won ten seats. The Greens, led by Nick McKim, won five seats and held the balance of power. The outcome in all five multimember seats was two Labor, two Liberal, and one Green. The Liberals were ahead on the popular vote by a margin of over 6,700 votes and both Premier David Bartlett and Opposition Leader Hodgman agreed that Hodgman thus had the right to form a government. Labor went as far as to vote to relinquish power and advise the Governor, Peter Underwood, to summon Hodgman to be commissioned as the new premier.

However, on 9 April, Underwood recommissioned Bartlett, detailing several reasons for his decision including incumbency and a higher chance of stability. The Liberal Party tabled motions of no-confidence in parliament against the Labor government, but these were unsuccessful.

An interim cabinet was sworn in on 13 April, with Bartlett as Premier and Labor deputy leader Lara Giddings as Deputy Premier. On 24 January 2011, Bartlett stood down from the premiership to be replaced by Giddings who was elected unopposed as Tasmania's first female Premier.

== Retiring MPs ==
=== Labor ===
- Michael Polley (Lyons) – announced on 6 June 2013.
- Graeme Sturges (Denison) – announced on 30 June 2013.

== Polling ==
Polling is regularly conducted for Tasmanian state politics by Enterprise Marketing and Research Services (EMRS). Unlike other pollsters, EMRS don't "prompt" their respondents for an answer on the first request, contributing to the large "undecided" percentage. The sample size for each poll is 1,000 Tasmanian voters.

House of Assembly (lower house) polling
		Political parties
	Lib	ALP	Grn	PUP	Ind	Undecided
Feb 2014	44%	20%	15%	5%	3%	13%
Nov 2013	44%	20%	17%	5%	4%	10%
Sep 2013	46%	25%	13%	0%	4%	12%
May 2013	40%	19%	9%	–	2%	30%
Feb 2013	44%	23%	11%	–	3%	29%
Nov 2012	43%	20%	12%	–	2%	24%
Aug 2012	38%	18%	17%	–	2%	25%
May 2012	38%	17%	17%	–	4%	25%
Feb 2012	39%	19%	14%	–	3%	25%
Nov 2011	42%	17%	15%	–	2%	24%
Aug 2011	44%	16%	14%	–	4%	22%
May 2011	38%	19%	17%	–	4%	22%
Feb 2011	36%	20%	20%	–	2%	23%
Nov 2010	35%	23%	20%	–	3%	19%
Aug 2010	30%	29%	23%	–	3%	14%
May 2010	38%	23%	24%	–	3%	12%
2010 election	39.0%	36.9%	21.6%	–	2.5%	–
Feb 2010	30%	23%	22%	–	2%	23%
Polling conducted by EMRS.

Preferred Premier polling^
	Labor Giddings	Liberal Hodgman	Green McKim
Feb 2014	21%	48%	13%
Nov 2013	22%	47%	12%
Sep 2013	18%	48%	12%
May 2013	25%	46%	10%
Feb 2013	24%	46%	13%
Nov 2012	25%	47%	11%
Aug 2012	22%	45%	15%
May 2012	21%	43%	17%
Feb 2012	24%	44%	15%
Nov 2011	19%	48%	14%
Aug 2011	19%	52%	13%
May 2011	22%	42%	18%
Feb 2011	27%	38%	16%
Nov 2010	23%^{1}	39%	21%
Aug 2010	27%^{1}	34%	22%
May 2010	26%^{1}	40%	23%
2010 election	–	–	–
Feb 2010	29%^{1}	34%	21%
Polling conducted by EMRS.^ Remainder were "uncommitted".^{1} David Bartlett.

== Results ==
Party	Votes	%	+/–	Seats	+/–
Liberal	167,051	51.22	▲12.23	15	▲5
Labor	89,130	27.33	▼9.55	7	▼3
Greens	45,098	13.83	▼7.78	3	▼2
Palmer United	16,198	4.97	New	0	New
National	2,655	0.81	▲0.81	0	Steady
Christians	1,215	0.37	▲0.37	0	Steady
Socialist Alliance	664	0.20	Steady	0	Steady
Independents	4,152	1.27	▼1.05	0	Steady
Total	326,163	100.00	–	25	–
Valid votes	326,163	95.20			
Invalid/blank votes	16,432	4.80	▲0.30		
Total votes	342,595	100.00	–		
Registered voters/turnout	366,442	93.49	▼0.36		
Source: TEC

=== Primary vote percentages by division ===
	Bass	Braddon	Denison	Franklin	Lyons
Labor Party	23.27%	23.24%	33.79%	28.61%	27.69%
Liberal Party	57.22%	58.76%	38.28%	49.84%	51.94%
Tasmanian Greens	12.72%	7.03%	21.19%	16.79%	11.40%
Other	6.79%	10.97%	6.74%	4.76%	8.97%

=== Current distribution of seats ===
Electorate	Seats held
Bass	
Braddon	
Denison	
Franklin	
Lyons	

Labor
Liberal
Green

=== Damage to ballot papers ===
On 16 March, the day after the election, the Tasmanian Electoral Commission announced that a machine being used to open envelopes containing postal votes from the Denison electorate had been operated improperly, resulting in damage to 2,338 ballot papers. Whilst 2,175 ballot papers were repaired and admitted to the count, 163 papers were too badly damaged to be used and were counted as informal.

== See also ==
- Candidates of the 2014 Tasmanian state election
- Members of the Tasmanian House of Assembly, 2014–2018
