= 2024 Tasmanian Legislative Council periodic election =

Legislative election in Tasmania, Australia

- 4 May 2024

3 of the 15 seats in the Legislative Council 8 seats needed for a majority

	First party	Second party
		IND
Party	Greens	Independent
Seats before	0 seats	7 seats
Seats won	1	1
Seats after	1	7
Seat change	▲1	Steady
	Third party	Fourth party
Party	Liberal	Labor
Seats before	4 seats	4 seats
Seats won	1	0
Seats after	4	3
Seat change	Steady	▼1

The 2024 Tasmanian Legislative Council periodic election were held on 4 May 2024 to elect three members of the Tasmanian Legislative Council. The seats of Hobart and Prosser were up for election, with a by-election for the seat of Elwick also held concurrently.

The Liberal Party retained Prosser with a swing towards them, while the Tasmanian Greens won their first upper house seat with a victory in Hobart. The Labor Party lost the Elwick by-election to independent candidate Bec Thomas.

== Background ==
Unlike other Australian state parliaments, the Tasmanian House of Assembly is elected from multi-member districts, while the Legislative Council is elected from single-member districts. The reverse is the case in most of the rest of Australia; that is, the lower house is elected from single-member districts while the upper house is elected from multi-member districts.

The Legislative Council has 15 seats, with members elected to a six-year term. Elections are staggered, alternating between three seats in one year and in two seats the next year, taking place on the first Saturday in May.

Tasmanian's upper house is unique in Australian politics, in that historically it is the only chamber in any state parliament to be significantly non-partisan. As of 2024, the chamber has a plurality of independents, although it has previously had an outright independent majority.

== Electoral system ==
Legislative Council elections use partial preferential voting and the Robson Rotation. In elections with four or less candidates, full preferential voting is effectively used, but for seats with five or more candidates, voters only have to number at least three boxes.

- Where there are more than 3 candidates, at least number 1, 2 and 3
- Where there are 3 candidates, at least number 1 and 2
- Where there are 2 candidates, at least number 1

== Hobart ==
Location of the division of Hobart in Tasmania

The seat of Hobart, based in the Tasmanian capital of Hobart, has been held by independent member Rob Valentine since 2012; he announced he will not recontest. Former Tasmanian House of Assembly MP and former state Greens leader Cassy O'Connor announced she will contest Hobart.

=== Hobart results ===
2024 Tasmanian Legislative Council periodic election: Hobart
Party	Candidate	Votes	%	±%
Greens	Cassy O'Connor	7,104	36.86	+36.86
Independent	John Kelly	4,287	22.24	+22.24
Labor	John Kamara	3,578	18.57	+18.57
Independent	Charlie Burton	2,615	13.57	+13.57
Independent	Stefan Vogel	725	3.76	+3.76
Independent	Sam Campbell	522	2.71	+2.71
Independent	Michael Haynes	441	2.29	+2.29
Total formal votes		19,272	97.49	+0.42
Informal votes		497	2.51	–0.42
Turnout		19,769	80.56	+4.14
Registered electors		24,538		
Two-candidate-preferred result
Greens	Cassy O'Connor	11,236	59.70	+59.70
Independent	John Kelly	7,586	40.30	+40.30
Greens gain from Independent				

== Prosser ==
Location of the division of Prosser in Tasmania

The east coast seat of Prosser has been held by Jane Howlett of the Liberal Party since 2018. She announced she would run in the state election in the seat of Lyons. She resigned on the 27th February 2024, as the resignation occurred near the scheduled periodic election in Prosser, no by-election was required. Former Deputy Premier of Tasmania and Leader of the Parliamentary Labor Party in Tasmania, Bryan Green, was endorsed by Labor to run in the seat. The mayor of the Sorell Council Kerry Vincent was announced as the Liberal Party candidate.

=== Prosser results ===
2024 Tasmanian Legislative Council periodic election: Prosser
Party	Candidate	Votes	%	±%
Liberal	Kerry Vincent	8,276	38.49	+12.36
Labor	Bryan Green	6,176	28.75	+6.83
Shooters, Fishers, Farmers	Phillip Bigg	2,664	12.40	+6.83
Independent	Pam Sharpe	2,378	11.07	+11.07
Independent	Kelly Spaulding	1,995	9.29	+7.34
Total formal votes		21,480	96.17	+1.18
Informal votes		856	3.83	–1.18
Turnout		22,336	81.46	–5.02
Registered electors		27,419		
Two-party-preferred result
Liberal	Kerry Vincent	11,186	52.93	+0.27
Labor	Bryan Green	9,949	47.07	–0.27
Liberal hold		Swing	+0.27	

== Elwick by-election ==
2024 Elwick state by-election
- 4 May 2024

Electoral division of Elwick in the Tasmanian Legislative Council

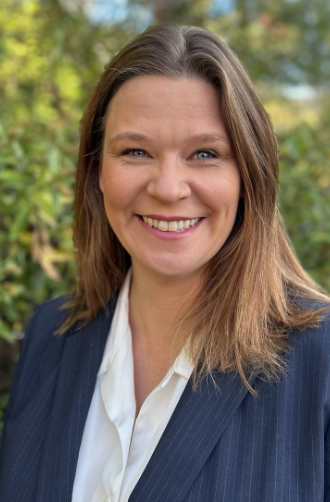

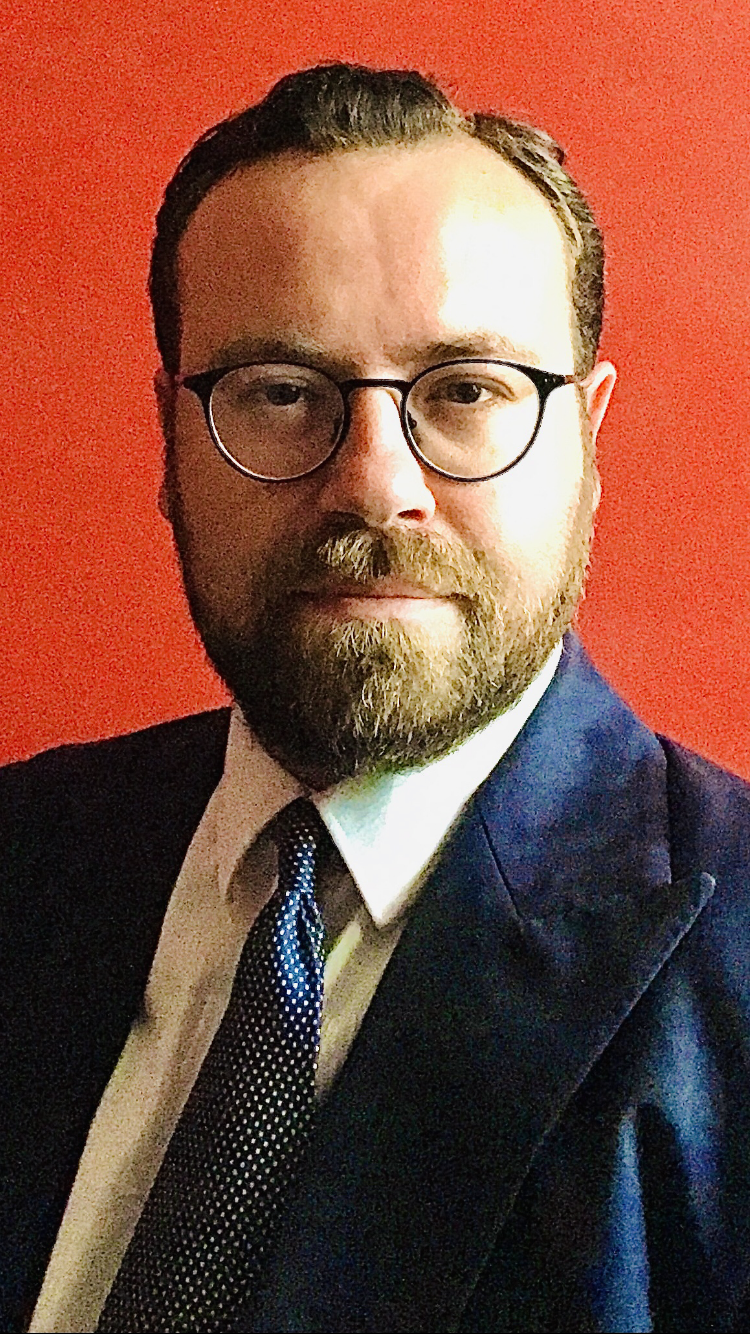
	First party	Second party
	IND
Candidate	Bec Thomas	Tessa McLaughlin
Party	Independent	Labor
First preference vote	6,208	5,194
Percentage	33.93%	28.39%
Swing	▲33.93	▼24.15
TPP	53.34%	46.66%
TPP swing	▲53.34	▼5.88
	Third party	Fourth party
Candidate	Janet Shelley	Fabiano Cangelosi
Party	Greens	Independent
First preference vote	3,476	3,417
Percentage	19.00%	18.66%
Swing	▼2.06	▲18.66
MLC before election
Josh Willie
Labor
Elected MLC
Bec Thomas
Independent

A by-election for the seat of Elwick was also held with the periodic elections, following the resignation of incumbent MLC Josh Willie.

Willie, a member of the Labor Party, was first elected in 2016 and was re-elected in 2022.

He announced on the 26 November 2023 that he would run in the next state election in the seat of Clark. After the 2024 Tasmanian state election was announced, he resigned on 27 February.

=== Candidates ===
The mayor of the City of Glenorchy, Bec Thomas announced in March that she would contest the by-election.

Barrister Fabiano Cangelosi sought Labor endorsement without any reciprocal requirement to vote with other Labor MPs. He resigned from the party to contest as an independent. Labor later endorsed Tessa McLaughlin as their candidate.

Party	Candidate	Background
Independent	Bec Thomas	Mayor of Glenorchy
Labor	Tessa McLaughlin	Electrician
Greens	Janet Shelley	Sustainability expert
Independent	Fabiano Cangelosi	Barrister

=== Elwick results ===
2024 Elwick state by-election
Party	Candidate	Votes	%	±%
Independent	Bec Thomas	6,208	33.93	+33.93
Labor	Tessa McLaughlin	5,194	28.39	–24.15
Greens	Janet Shelley	3,476	19.00	–2.06
Independent	Fabiano Cangelosi	3,417	18.66	+18.66
Total formal votes		18,295	95.73	–0.63
Informal votes		816	4.27	+0.63
Turnout		19,111	80.74	+2.71
Registered electors		23,669		
Two-candidate-preferred result
Independent	Bec Thomas	9,758	53.34	+53.34
Labor	Tessa McLaughlin	8,537	46.66	–5.88
Independent gain from Labor				
