= Candidates of the 2014 Tasmanian state election =

This article provides information on candidates who stood at the 2014 Tasmanian state election, held on 15 March 2014.

== Retiring Members ==
=== Labor ===
- Michael Polley MP (Lyons)
- Graeme Sturges MP (Denison)

== House of Assembly ==
Sitting members at the time of the election are shown in bold text. Tickets that elected at least one MHA are highlighted in the relevant colour. Successful candidates are indicated by an asterisk (*).

=== Bass ===
Five seats were up for election. The Labor Party was defending two seats. The Liberal Party was defending two seats. The Tasmanian Greens were defending one seat.

Labor candidates	Liberal candidates	Greens candidates	Palmer candidates	Christians candidates	Ungrouped candidates
Andrew Connor; Adam Gore; Senka Mujkic; **Michelle O'Byrne***; **Brian Wightman**	Sarah Courtney*; **Michael Ferguson***; **Peter Gutwein***; Barry Jarvis; Leonie McNair	**Kim Booth***; Andrea Dawkins; Anna Povey; Anne Layton-Bennett; Amy Tyler	Chris Dobson; Brian Gunst; Mark Hines; Tim Parish	Ray Kroeze	Brett Lucas; Andrew Roberts

=== Braddon ===
Five seats were up for election. The Labor Party was defending two seats. The Liberal Party was defending two seats. The Tasmanian Greens were defending one seat.

Labor candidates	Liberal candidates	Greens candidates	Palmer candidates	National candidates	Christians candidates	Ungrouped candidates
Darryl Bessell; **Brenton Best**; Shane Broad; **Bryan Green***; Justine Keay	**Adam Brooks***; Kyron Howell; Roger Jaensch*; **Jeremy Rockliff***; Joan Rylah*	Chris Cornell; Melissa Houghton; Philip Nicholas; **Paul O'Halloran**; Sally O'Wheel	Scott Alexander; Julian Brown; Kevin Deakin; Steven Green; Kevin Morgan	Emmanuel Benjamin; Ken Dorsey; Liz van der Linde-Keep	Kevin Swarts	Mick Anderson; Tony W. Brown

=== Denison ===
Five seats were up for election. The Labor Party was defending two seats. The Liberal Party was defending two seats. The Tasmanian Greens were defending one seat.

Labor candidates	Liberal candidates	Greens candidates	Palmer candidates	National candidates	Socialist Alliance candidates	Independent candidates
Julian Amos; **Scott Bacon***; Sharon Carnes; Alphonse Mulumba; Madeleine Ogilvie*	**Elise Archer***; Deborah De Williams; **Matthew Groom***; René Kling; Robert Mallett	Penelope Ann; Philip Cocker; Bill Harvey; **Cassy O'Connor***; Alan Whykes	Barbara Etter; Charles Forrest; Mark Grube; Rob Newitt; Justin Stringer	Domenic Allocca; Julian Edwards; Vlad Gala	Shaine Stephen	Leo Foley; Michael Swanton; Marti Zucco; Freddy Hill; Lucas Noyes; Hans Willink

Note: Foley, Swanton and Zucco have each qualified for their own group. Hill, Noyes and Willink are all ungrouped Independents.

=== Franklin ===
Five seats were up for election. The Labor Party was defending two seats. The Liberal Party was defending two seats. The Tasmanian Greens was defending one seat.

Labor candidates	Liberal candidates	Greens candidates	Palmer candidates	National candidates	Socialist Alliance candidates
Heather Chong; Julie Dick; **Lara Giddings***; Russell Mitchell; **David O'Byrne**	Sue Bastone; Paul Harriss*; **Will Hodgman***; **Jacquie Petrusma***; Nic Street	Richard Atkinson; Simon Burnett; Zoe Kean; **Nick McKim***; Rosalie Woodruff	Michael Figg; John Peers; Luke Rutherford; Con Spiliopoulos; Debra Thurley	Matt Holloway; Penny Lane; Myrtle Wakeling	Jenny Forward

=== Lyons ===
Five seats were up for election. The Labor Party was defending two seats. The Liberal Party was defending two seats. The Tasmanian Greens were defending one seat.

Labor candidates	Liberal candidates	Greens candidates	Palmer candidates	National candidates	Ungrouped candidates
Darren Clark; Jessey Dillon; Bob Gordon; David Llewellyn*; **Rebecca White***	Guy Barnett*; Bertrand Cadart; Martyn Evans; **Rene Hidding***; **Mark Shelton***	Pip Brinklow; **Tim Morris**; Hannah Rudenach; Glenn Millar; Stephanie Taylor	Mark Grewar; Wayne Shoobridge; Quentin von Stieglitz	Craig Davey; Brett Hall; Leo Perotti; Anne Salt	Paul Belcher; Murray Stewart

== See also ==
- Members of the Tasmanian House of Assembly, 2010–2014
