= Jim Bacon Foundation =

Australian philantrhopic organisation

The Jim Bacon Foundation is a philanthropic organisation based in Tasmania, Australia. It provides practical support and financial assistance to cancer patients and organisations that support them during their treatment. It also offers three scholarships through the University of Tasmania which are granted to students studying fine arts, political science or the care and treatment of cancer.

The foundation is named after Jim Bacon, who spent 25 years working in the union movement, was elected to the Tasmanian House of Assembly and became Premier of Tasmania, a position he held from 1998 until his resignation in March 2004.

The Jim Bacon Foundation was formed by passage of the Jim Bacon Foundation Act 2004 through the Tasmanian Parliament. Bacon was diagnosed with inoperable lung cancer while still serving as Premier of Tasmania, and died in June 2004, six months before the legislation received Royal Assent.

The Foundation was absorbed into the Ricky Ponting Foundation in May 2013. The State Government will continue to fund the $30,000 Jim Bacon Memorial Scholarship at the University of Tasmania.

== Scholarship recipients ==
Year	Name	Area of study	Ref
2008	Dominique Higgins	cancer care and treatment	
2008	Chavelli Sulikowski	political science	
2008	Emma Tidey	political science	
2008	Scott Cotterel	visual arts	
2012	Nick Sageman	political science	
2016	Emma Richardson	cancer care and treatment	
2018	Laura Gillam	visual arts	
