= Tasmanian Trades & Labor Council =

Peak trade union body in Tasmania, Australia

- Nickname: Unions Tasmania
- Formation: 1968; 58 years ago
- Merger of: Hobart Trades Hall Council; Launceston Trades and Labor Council; Devonport Trades and Labor Council
- Type: Labour council
- Headquarters: Hobart, Tasmania
- Location: Australia
- Members: 50,000 (2026)
- Secretary: Jessica Munday
- Affiliations: ACTU
- Website: www.unionstas.com.au

The Tasmanian Trades & Labor Council, also known as Unions Tasmania, is a representative body of trade union organisations in the State of Tasmania, Australia. It is the peak union body in Tasmania, made up of affiliated unions who represent some 50,000 workers. It is the Tasmanian Branch of the Australian Council of Trade Unions (ACTU).

== Secretaries ==
Jessica Munday has been secretary of Unions Tasmania since January 2017, when she filled a casual vacancy left by the retirement of her predecessor, Steve Walsh. She was elected unopposed to the position in October 2018, making her only the second woman to lead the Tasmanian union movement in its 140-plus-year history. Notable past Trades Hall secretaries include:

- Lynne Fitzgerald was elected as secretary in 1995, the first woman to be elected as a secretary of an Australian state trades and labor council. She resigned in December 2004, after nine years in the role, to take up a position with the Tasmanian Department of Economic Development.
- Jim Bacon was secretary from 1989, before entering the Tasmanian House of Assembly in 1996 and serving as Premier of Tasmania between 1998 and 2004.
- Paul Lennon became secretary in 1984, when the Tasmanian union movement was reunited under his leadership, before being elected to the Tasmanian House of Assembly in 1990 and becoming Premier in 2004.
- Robert Watling (aged 29) was secretary from 1976 to 1980. In September 1977 he and TLC minute secretary Peter Imlach were expelled from the Australian Labor Party over alleged support for the National Civic Council. He subsequently served as a Tasmanian Wages Boards Commissioner from 1980 to 2003, and as a Tasmanian Public Service Commissioner from 2004 to 2016.
- Brian Harradine was secretary from 1964 to 1976, and entered the Federal Parliament where he became Australia's longest-serving independent senator (1975–2005).
- John Henry O'Neil was secretary from 1927 to 1958, then 1962 to 1967, and also secretary of the Eight Hours Day Committee from 1921 to 1967.

== History ==
The earliest trade unions in Tasmania were established during the first half of the 19th century, although most of them dissolved within five years. The first evidence of organised union activity dates to a printers’ association formed in 1829. In the 1830s, unions emerged for specific artisan trades, including bootmaking, tailoring, baking and carpentry. Most unions did not attempt to organise workers across multiple trades until the 1880s. Notable early exceptions included the short-lived Hobart Trades Union (1844–1853) and the Hobart Mercantile Assistants' Association (1847–1855).

Tasmania's first relatively popular workers' organisations were the Hobart Trades & Labor Council, formed in 1883, and the Launceston Trades and Labor Council, founded in 1889. In 1917, the former became known as the Hobart Trades Hall Council. A Burnie Trades and Labour Council was also formed, in 1940, and the Devonport Trades and Labor Council was established in 1945. In 1968, the Trades Halls of Hobart, Launceston and Devonport councils amalgamated as the Tasmanian Trades & Labor Council; Burnie's council chose to remain independent rather than join the merger. The council took on the operating name "Unions Tasmania" around the turn of the millennium.
