= Albert Van Zetten =

Alderman Albert Van Zetten AM

Mayor of Launceston
- In office 2007–2022
- Deputy: Danny Gibson (2018-present); Rob Soward (2014–2018); Jeremy Ball (2011–2014)
- Preceded by: Ivan Dean
- Succeeded by: Danny Gibson
- Constituency: City of Launceston

Albert Van Zetten (born 12 April 1954) is an Australian politician and the former Mayor of Launceston, Tasmania. He was formerly CEO of City Mission Launceston, and worked as an accountant. He lives in Riverside with his wife Lyndle.

He is well known for his opposition to the Bell Bay Pulp Mill, which played a part in his election.

Van Zetten was appointed a Member of the Order of Australia in the 2025 King's Birthday Honours for "significant service to local government, and to the community".
