= AustSino =

Mining company based in Western Australia

AustSino Resources Group
- Formerly: Padbury Mining
- Traded as: ASX: ANS
- Industry: Mining
- Headquarters: West Perth, Western Australia
- Key people: Chun Ming Ding (Executive Chairman); Michael Keemink (Executive Director)
- Website: www.aust-sino.com

AustSino Resources Group, formerly Padbury Mining, is an Australian mining corporation. It was publicly listed on the Australian Securities Exchange until 2020.

== Overview ==
It has 2000 km^{2} of tenements in the Mid West part of Western Australia. It has explored Peak Hill, Western Australia, where magnetite was found in 2011.

In April 2014, reached an agreement with businessman Roland Bleyer to fund a port and railway project in Oakajee. However, due to disparaging press coverage of Bleyer's past business dealings, the project was put on hold. Moreover, the company stopped trading on 11 April 2014 after failing to meet the demands from the Australian Securities Exchange. Bleyer criticised this decision, adding the project would have "created jobs for the working man that needs to feed his family."

In February 2017, Padbury Mining was renamed AustSino Resources Group. In December 2020, it was delisted from the Australian Securities Exchange.
