= Roland Bleyer =

Former Australian businessman and entrepreneur (1946-2018)

Roland Frank Bleyer (2 July 1946 – 19 April 2018) was an Australian businessman, best known for his chain of hair regrowth and cosmetic surgery clinics throughout Australia and New Zealand, and his frequent legal problems.

Born in Vienna to an Austrian mother and an American father, Bleyer emigrated to Australia when he was 10 years old. He moved to New Zealand and opened his first office in 1970, then expanded the franchise across Australia.

He was involved in business dealings globally, including through several companies which gained prominence. Later in his career, his business interests were in the financial industry, and he served as Chairman of the Finance Committee of Hayman Private Equity.

== Career ==
=== Hair, cosmetic and cell therapy ===
Bleyer began his work in the field of trichology in the late 1960s, later branching out to other cosmetic procedures. After launching his business in New Zealand, he opened a clinic in Sydney in 1980. By 1990, he had established The Bleyer Clinic (aka Clinik Zurich) offices in Sydney, Parramatta, Melbourne, Brisbane, Auckland, Wellington and Christchurch.

In the 1980s, Bleyer clinics began offering cosmetic acupuncture, laser treatments and chemical facial rejuvenation. Bleyer also explored cell therapy and research into genetic engineering. He planned to establish a trial clinic for cell therapy as "a platform from which he would develop a much wider business interest" but this was put on hold following publicity he received on the Willesee program and during subsequent defamation cases against TCN-9.

Bleyer had visited Niehan's Clinique La Prairie on a "fact-finding mission" about treatments using animal fetal cell injections. He later claimed his daughter with Down syndrome "had received cell therapy treatment about every six months for four years and there had been no harmful effects" but medical authorities warned against the treatment, stating it was "of no benefit, possibly dangerous".

=== Restaurant franchises ===
Bleyer tried to emulate the success of the Irish Abrakebabra restaurant chain by offering the franchise in Australia. He opened a pilot store in Manly and in November 1989, advertised the "opportunity to purchase the Australian rights and sell franchises to potential investors."

Bleyer's kebab shop fell victim to arson while he was travelling interstate. The store manager reported that "three men entered the restaurant shortly after midnight ... and the intruders set alight the front of the building."

=== Business and finance ===
Bleyer's business interests later in life were in the financial industry, securing funds and loans from private firms. He served as Chairman of the Finance Committee of Hayman Private Equity, and was involved with associated companies including Superkite and Alliance Super Holdings.

Through his various companies and extensive network, Bleyer offered to arrange finance for several multi-billion-dollar deals, including:

- US$50,000,000,000 (equivalent to $79,853,086,800 in 2025) to help fund the Ninth Malaysia Plan
- US$400,000,000 (equivalent to $600,279,200 in 2025) for a joint venture between Superkite and Ross Glickman to purchase real estate following the Global Financial Crisis
- €20,000,000,000 to help resolve the Greek government-debt crisis
- A$6,500,000,000 (equivalent to $7,800,610,200 in 2022) to fund Padbury Mining's port and rail project at Oakajee, Western Australia
- Other deals as part of his role on the finance committee for Royal Bank (Azerbaijan)

== Legal actions ==
In 1989, Bleyer failed in a defamation lawsuit against the Nine Network over his plans for an experimental Down syndrome treatment.

During the 1990s, he was the subject of fraud and drug charges in the United States, though they were dismissed. In 1995, an Australian federal court judge found that there was "compelling" evidence that Bleyer had defrauded the ANZ bank as part of a credit card scam.

In 2014, he was investigated by the Australian Securities and Investment Commission over accusations of irregular trading concerning a Padbury Mining company deal he was involved with.

In 2014, Bleyer instituted a defamation action against Google. The Supreme Court of New South Wales permanently stayed the case, ruling that Google was not a publisher of automated search results before receiving complaints, and that the estimated A$370,000 (equivalent to $444,000 in 2022) legal costs of the case were disproportionate to the minimal harm to only three people from the publication. The case became a landmark, establishing Australia's first application of the proportionality principle in defamation law.

== Personal life ==
Bleyer lived in Collaroy with his wife and three children. One of his children is politician Vanessa Bleyer.

In 1990, he left Australia on a business trip and did not return until 1998. During this time, Bleyer's family were unable to pay their bills and were eventually evicted from their home.

Bleyer was a Lions Club member and is known to have made charitable donations to leprosy care in Africa, the Queensland flood appeal, and the Sport and Tourism Youth Foundation (established by John Brown).

Roland Bleyer died on 19 April 2018 and was buried at the Hütteldorf Cemetery in Vienna.
