= Warwick Smith (politician) =

Australian politician

The Honourable Warwick Smith AO

Minister for Family Services
- In office 6 October 1997 – 21 October 1998
- Prime Minister: John Howard
- Preceded by: Judi Moylan
- Succeeded by: Jocelyn Newman

Minister for Sport, Local Government and the 2000 Sydney Olympic Games
- In office 11 March 1996 – 6 October 1997
- Prime Minister: John Howard
- Preceded by: John Faulkner
- Succeeded by: Andrew Thomson

Manager of Opposition Business
- In office 23 May 1992 – 7 April 1993
- Leader: John Hewson
- Preceded by: Wal Fife
- Succeeded by: John Howard

Member of the Australian Parliament for Bass
- In office 1 December 1984 – 13 March 1993
- Preceded by: Kevin Newman
- Succeeded by: Silvia Smith (no relation)
- In office 2 March 1996 – 3 October 1998
- Preceded by: Silvia Smith
- Succeeded by: Michelle O'Byrne

Personal details
- Born: Warwick Leslie Smith; 13 May 1954 (age 72) Launceston, Tasmania
- Party: Liberal Party of Australia
- Education: Australian National University; University of Tasmania
- Occupation: Solicitor

Warwick Leslie Smith AO (born 13 May 1954) is an Australian former politician from Tasmania. He was a Liberal member of the Australian House of Representatives from December 1984 to March 1993 and again from March 1996 to October 1998, representing the Division of Bass, Tasmania.

== Early life and education ==
Warwick Leslie Smith was born on 13 May 1954 in Launceston, Tasmania.

He attended the Australian National University and University of Tasmania, graduating with a Bachelor of Laws.

== Career ==
Smith first worked as a solicitor.

He was elected to Parliament in 1984 and later held two ministries in John Howard's government: Minister for Sport, Territories and Local Government from March 1996 to October 1997, and then Minister for Family Services until October 1998.

Smith lost his seat in the 1998 general election to ALP candidate Michelle O'Byrne. He has since held several management positions in the corporate sector, including as an executive director of Macquarie Bank, head of the Australia China Business Council. He was chair of ANZ New South Wales and of the advisory board of Australian Equity Group, an investment company owned by Kerry Stokes, in 2007.

From July 2010 to April 2012, Smith was chairman of the Australian Sports Commission.

He chaired the Australia–China Council at the time of its winding up by the government in 2019, assuming the role of chair of the replacement agency, the National Foundation for Australia–China Relations. However he resigned a year later, after raising "concerns over the structure, independence, and effectiveness" of the new body.

He was interviewed in 2019 by Daniel Connell about the Australian-China Council. The interview can be found at the National Library of Australia.

== Honours ==
Smith was appointed a Member of the Order of Australia (AM) in the Australia Day Honours List on 26 January 2008, and Officer of the Order of Australia (AO) on 26 January 2019.

Political offices
Preceded by John Faulkner	Minister for Sport, Territories and Local Government; 1996–1997	Succeeded by Alex Somlyay (Territories and Local Government); Andrew Thomson (Sport)
Preceded by Judi Moylan	Minister for Family Services; 1997–1998	Succeeded by Jocelyn Newman
Parliament of Australia
Preceded by Kevin Newman	Member for Bass; 1984–1993	Succeeded by Silvia Smith
Preceded by Silvia Smith	Member for Bass; 1996–1998	Succeeded by Michelle O'Byrne
