= Tania Rattray =

Australian politician (born 1958)

The Honourable Tania Rattray MLC

Leader for the Government in the Tasmanian Legislative Council
- Incumbent
- Assumed office 9 August 2025
- Premier: Jeremy Rockliff
- Deputy: Jo Palmer
- Preceded by: Leonie Hiscutt

Member of the Tasmanian Legislative Council for McIntyre
- Incumbent
- Assumed office 5 August 2017
- Preceded by: Division created

Member of the Tasmanian Legislative Council for Apsley
- In office 1 May 2004 – 5 August 2017
- Preceded by: Colin Rattray
- Succeeded by: Division abolished

Personal details
- Born: 28 March 1958 (age 68) Scottsdale, Tasmania
- Party: Independent
- Other political affiliations: Third Rockliff ministry
- Occupation: Pharmacy assistant

Tania Verene Rattray (formerly Rattray-Wagner, born 28 March 1958) is an Australian politician who has served as a member of the Tasmanian Legislative Council since 2004. A right-leaning Independent, she has represented the division of McIntyre since 2017. Prior to this, she served as the member for Apsley from 2004 until 2017.

In August 2025, while still remaining an independent, Rattray was appointed as Leader for the Government in the Legislative Council by Premier Jeremy Rockliff. She has pledged to support government bills and agenda unless she has a serious disagreement.

== Early life ==
Rattray was educated at Winnaleah Area School and Scottsdale High School. Before becoming a full-time politician, she was an owner/operator of the Winnaleah Four Square Supermarket from 1988 to 1994. She was also a Senior Pharmacy Assistant at Galloways Pharmacy in Scottsdale from 1994 to 2004.

== Political career ==
She was elected to Dorset Council in 1996, becoming deputy mayor in 2002. She stood for election in the Apsley division on 1 May 2004 when her father Colin Rattray retired. She narrowly led on primary votes and was elected after the distribution of preferences.

Rattray was re-elected unopposed in Apsley in 2010. She won re-election against opposition in 2016. Apsley was subsequently abolished in 2017 following the 2016–17 Legislative Council redistribution process, Rattray and fellow MLC Greg Hall were both assigned to the new seat of McIntyre in 2017. After Hall retired in 2018 when the new seat of Prosser was to be first contested, Rattray became the sole MLC for McIntyre.

She then contested the 2022 election in McIntyre against opposition and won.

== See also ==
- Members of the Legislative Council

Tasmanian Legislative Council
Preceded by Colin Rattray	Member for Apsley; 2004–2017	Division abolished
New division	Member for McIntyre; 2017–present Served alongside: Greg Hall	Incumbent
