= Nick Duigan (politician) =

Australian politician

The Honourable Nick Duigan MLC

Minister for Energy and Renewables
- Incumbent
- Assumed office 11 April 2024
- Premier: Jeremy Rockliff
- Preceded by: Guy Barnett

Minister for Sports and Events
- Incumbent
- Assumed office 20 October 2024
- Premier: Jeremy Rockliff
- Preceded by: Nic Street

Minister for Parks
- Incumbent
- Assumed office 11 April 2024
- Premier: Jeremy Rockliff
- Preceded by: Roger Jaensch

Member of the Tasmanian Legislative Council for Windermere
- Incumbent
- Assumed office 1 May 2021
- Preceded by: Ivan Dean

Personal details
- Born: 1 May 1970 (age 56) Gisborne, Victoria
- Party: Liberal

Nicholas John Henry Duigan (born 1 May 1970) is an Australian politician. He has been the Liberal member for Windermere in the Tasmanian Legislative Council since May 2021.

Duigan hosted the fishing television program Hook, Line and Sinker for over twenty years.

He and his dad survived a plane crash on 8 January 2009, as a result he was injured.

Tasmanian Legislative Council
Preceded by Ivan Dean	Member for Windermere; 2021–present	Incumbent
