= Kathryn Hay =

Australian politician

Member of the Tasmanian House of Assembly for Bass
- In office 20 July 2002 – 18 March 2006

Personal details
- Born: Kathryn Isobel Hay; 24 November 1975 (age 50) Launceston, Tasmania, Australia
- Party: Labor Party

Kathryn Isobel Hay (born 24 November 1975 in Launceston) is an Australian Labor politician and former member of the Tasmanian House of Assembly in the electorate of Bass. She was first elected in the 2002 election.

Hay was the first woman of Aboriginal descent to be elected in Tasmania (in her maiden speech she points out that her Aboriginal ancestors are Western Australian, not Tasmanian). She was chosen as Miss Tasmania (1999) and Miss Australia (1999).

Hay did not re-contest her seat at the 2006 election. Her term ended when parliament was dissolved on 17 March 2006.

In February 2009, Hay announced she would stand for the Legislative Council division of Windermere, but was defeated by the incumbent, Ivan Dean, at the May 2009 election.

In 2023 Kathryn Isobel Hay was charged with emotional abuse or intimidation of her husband. In March 2025 she was found guilty of the charges, with the court finding that between January 2014 and November 2022 she had been emotionally abusive and controlling of him. Hay denies the allegations, alleging instead that she was the victim of abuse.
