= Kerry Vincent (politician) =

Australian politician

The Honourable Kerry Vincent MLC

Member of the Tasmanian Legislative Council for Prosser
- Incumbent
- Assumed office 4 May 2024
- Preceded by: Jane Howlett

Minister for Housing and Planning
- Incumbent
- Assumed office 7 August 2025
- Premier: Jeremy Rockliff
- Preceded by: Felix Ellis

Minister for Infrastructure
- Incumbent
- Assumed office 23 October 2024
- Premier: Jeremy Rockliff
- Preceded by: Michael Ferguson

Minister for Local Government
- Incumbent
- Assumed office 23 October 2024
- Premier: Jeremy Rockliff
- Preceded by: Nic Street

Mayor of Sorell
- In office 2012 – 4 May 2024

Personal details
- Born: 24 November 1960 (age 65) Launceston, Tasmania, Australia

Kerry John Vincent (born 24 November 1960) is an Australian politician representing the division of Prosser for the Tasmanian Liberals since the 2024 Tasmanian Legislative Council periodic election. Vincent succeeded former member for Prosser, Jane Howlett, after she resigned from the office and subsequently won a seat in the lower house. Vincent was also Mayor of the Sorell Council from 2012 until his resignation in 2024.

== Political career ==
In October 2024, Vincent was promoted by Premier Rockliff to the portfolios of Minister for Infrastructure and Minister for Local Government.

Tasmanian Legislative Council
Preceded by Jane Howlett	Member for Prosser; 2024–present	Incumbent
