= Colin Rattray =

Australian politician

Colin Rattray OAM

Member of the Tasmanian Legislative Council for Apsley
- In office 1 July 1999 – 1 May 2004
- Preceded by: Division created
- Succeeded by: Tania Rattray

Member of the Tasmanian Legislative Council for South Esk
- In office 23 May 1992 – 31 June 1999
- Preceded by: Dick Archer
- Succeeded by: Division abolished

Personal details
- Born: 28 December 1931 Scottsdale, Tasmania
- Died: 19 February 2009 (aged 77) Winnaleah, Tasmania
- Party: Independent

Colin Lewis Rattray OAM (28 December 1931 – 19 February 2009) was an Australian politician. He was an Independent member of the Tasmanian Legislative Council from 1992 to 2004, representing first South Esk and then Apsley.

Rattray was born in Scottsdale, and was elected Mayor of Ringarooma in 1981. In 1992 he was elected to the Legislative Council for South Esk, which he held until that seat was replaced by Apsley in 1999. He remained member for Apsley until 2004, when he retired; he was succeeded by his daughter, Tania Rattray.

Rattray died in February 2009, aged 77.

Tasmanian Legislative Council
Preceded by Dick Archer	Member for South Esk; 1992–1999	Abolished
New seat	Member for Apsley; 1999–2004	Succeeded by Tania Rattray
