= Electoral division of Rowallan =

Tasmanian Legislative Council electoral division

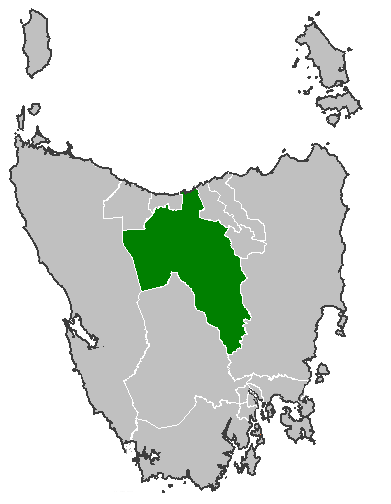
Rowallan Electorate

The Electoral division of Rowallan was one of the 15 Tasmanian Legislative Council electorates or seats from 1999 to 2008, but it was renamed 'Western Tiers' in 2008 after a redistribution of boundaries.

From 2001, the seat was held by independent member Greg Hall.

The electorate was created after the 1999 redistribution and includes many towns in northern rural Tasmania. The boundary is 9,987 km^{2} in area.

Rowallan has 21,153 enrolled voters, the lowest of any of the fifteen Legislative Council constituencies.

Many towns are located within Rowallan including: Deloraine, Latrobe, Sheffield, Westbury, Cressy, Longford, Carrick, Bothwell, Frankford, Bishopsbourne, Port Sorrell, Waddamana, Interlaken and part of Perth.

The last election held on 6 May 2006 saw current member Greg Hall defeat a sole Tasmanian Greens opponent, Karen Cassidy with an 81.95% primary vote.

== Members ==
Member	Party	Period
John Loone	Independent	1999–2001
Greg Hall	Independent	2001–2008

== See also ==
- Electoral division of Western Tiers
