= Ken Bacon (politician) =

Australian politician

The Honourable Ken Bacon

Minister for Tourism, Parks and Heritage
- In office 22 March 2004 – 11 April 2005
- Premier: Paul Lennon
- Preceded by: Jim Bacon
- Succeeded by: Judy Jackson

Member of the Tasmanian House of Assembly for Lyons
- In office 29 August 1998 – 29 April 2005
- Succeeded by: Heather Butler

Personal details
- Born: Kenneth John Bacon; 2 March 1944 (age 82) Hobart, Tasmania, Australia
- Party: Labor Party

Kenneth John Bacon (born 2 March 1944) was a Labor Party member of the Tasmanian House of Assembly from 1998 until 2005.

He was the Minister for Tourism, Parks and Heritage in Paul Lennon's government from 2004 to 2005. He retired from parliament and the ministry due to ill health, effective as of 29 April 2005.
