= Peter Whish-Wilson =

Australian politician

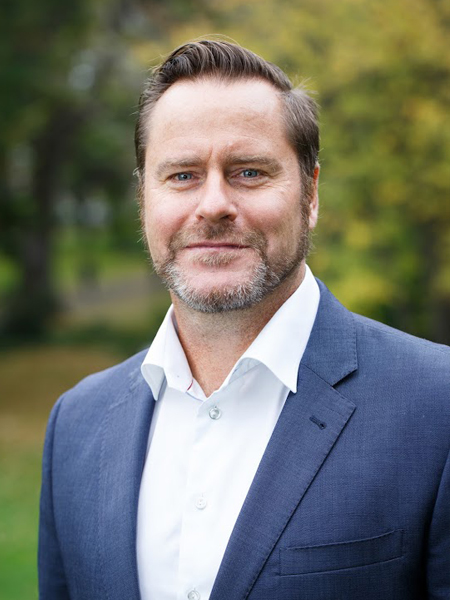

Senator for Tasmania
- In office 20 June 2012 – 14 August 2026
- Preceded by: Bob Brown
- Succeeded by: Vanessa Bleyer

Personal details
- Born: Peter Stuart Whish-Wilson; 24 February 1968 (age 58) Singapore
- Party: Australian Greens
- Spouse: Natalie
- Children: 2
- Education: Australian Defence Force Academy; Royal Military College, Duntroon; University of Western Australia
- Occupation: Economist; Winemaker; Senator
- Website: greens.org.au/tas/person/peter-whish-wilson

Peter Stuart Whish-Wilson (born 24 February 1968) is an Australian politician who served as a Senator for Tasmania from 2012 to 2026, representing the Australian Greens. Formerly a lecturer in economics at the University of Tasmania, Whish-Wilson was appointed to the Senate to fill a casual vacancy caused by the retirement of former party leader Bob Brown and has since won election in his own right in 2013, 2016 and 2022.

== Early life and education ==
Whish-Wilson was born in Singapore in 1968 to Australian parents. He attended the Australian Defence Force Academy from 1986 to 1988, where he obtained a Bachelor of Arts degree in Economics and Politics. He also attended Royal Military College, Duntroon in 1989, and was medically discharged from the Australian Army shortly afterwards. From 1991 to 1992, he studied for a Master of Economics degree at the University of Western Australia.

== Career ==
After graduation, Whish-Wilson worked for Merrill Lynch in New York and Melbourne, serving as Vice-President from 1994 to 1998. He then worked in international sales for Deutsche Bank from 1998 to 2004, and as Lecturer in Economics and Finance at the University of Tasmania from 2005 to 2012. He jointly owned Three Wishes Vineyard with his family in the Tamar Valley, Tasmania, serving as its director from 2003 to 2012. The vineyard has now been sold and is no longer operating.

== Political career ==
Whish-Wilson was chosen by the Parliament of Tasmania under section 15 of the Constitution to represent the State in the Senate in 2012. He was elected Senator for Tasmania in 2013, with his term beginning on 1 July 2014. He was Chair of Committees from 2013 to 2016, and has been a member of various joint, legislation, references, select and statutory committees. He served on the Rural and Regional Affairs and Transport references and legislation committees, and was a substitute member of the Environment and Communications references committee.

He held the following portfolios for the Australian Greens: Healthy Oceans, Waste and Recycling, and Agriculture, Treasury, Consumer Affairs, Defence, Veterans Affairs, Small Business and Competition, Finance, Tourism, Trade, Marine (Tasmania), Fisheries, Whaling and Antarctica.

In September 2023, Whish-Wilson joined a cross-party delegation of Australian MPs to Washington, D.C., to lobby the U.S. Department of Justice to abandon its attempts to extradite Australian publisher Julian Assange from the United Kingdom. The other members were Alex Antic, Barnaby Joyce, Monique Ryan, David Shoebridge, and Tony Zappia.

Whish-Wilson retired from the Senate in August 2026 and was replaced by Vanessa Bleyer.

== Personal life ==
Whish-Wilson's brother is the author David Whish-Wilson. The Australian classical tubist also named Peter Whish-Wilson is a second cousin.

He has revealed that he takes medical cannabis as a part of his shingles treatment.
