= Jane Howlett =

Australian politician

The Honourable Jane Howlett MP

Minister for Racing
- In office 11 April 2024 – 16 June 2026
- Premier: Jeremy Rockliff
- Preceded by: Felix Ellis
- Succeeded by: Roger Jaensch

Minister for Women and the Prevention of Family Violence
- In office 7 August 2025 – 16 June 2026
- Premier: Jeremy Rockliff
- Preceded by: Jo Palmer
- Succeeded by: Jo Palmer

Minister for Tourism, Hospitality and Events
- In office 7 August 2025 – 16 June 2026
- Premier: Jeremy Rockliff
- Preceded by: multiple (portfolios merged)
- Succeeded by: Roger Jaensch

Minister for Primary Industries and Water
- In office 11 April 2024 – 7 August 2025
- Premier: Jeremy Rockliff
- Preceded by: Jo Palmer
- Succeeded by: Gavin Pearce

Minister for Hospitality and Small Business
- In office 11 April 2024 – 7 August 2025
- Premier: Jeremy Rockliff
- Preceded by: Madeleine Ogilvie

Member of the Tasmanian House of Assembly for Lyons
- Incumbent
- Assumed office 23 March 2024 Serving with 6 others

Member of the Tasmanian Legislative Council for Prosser
- In office 5 May 2018 – 27 January 2024
- Preceded by: Division created
- Succeeded by: Kerry Vincent

Personal details
- Born: 1975 or 1976 (age 49–50) Richmond, Tasmania, Australia
- Party: Liberal Party
- Spouse: Sergei Nester

Jane Colleen Howlett is an Australian politician, who was a Liberal member of the Tasmanian Legislative Council for the division of Prosser and is now member for the Division of Lyons.

After Peter Gutwein became Premier in January 2020, Howlett was promoted to his cabinet as Minister for Sport and Recreation and Minister for Racing. After the 2021 Tasmanian state election in May 2021, she was additionally appointed Minister for Small Business and Minister for Women in the Second Gutwein Ministry. A reshuffle of the cabinet on 17 February 2022 resulted in Howlett also becoming Minister for Disability Services, Minister for Hospitality and Events, but losing the sports portfolio to Nic Street. However, a week later on 25 February, Howlett resigned from the cabinet, citing "personal reasons after the death of her brother", who died the day the Second Gutwein Ministry was sworn in. She has stated she would remain a member of parliament. Her portfolios were taken over by Madeleine Ogilvie later that week.

Howlett stood down as the Member for Prosser to stand as a Liberal candidate in the Lyons at the 2024 Tasmanian state election., Howlett was subsequently elected, with the third highest primary vote in the division.

Howlett was re-elected at the 2025 Tasmanian state election.

Howlett resigned as Minister for Racing on 16 June 2026.

Political offices
Preceded by Jo Palmer	Minister for Primary Industries and Water; 2024–present	Incumbent
Preceded by Felix Ellis	Minister for Racing; 2024–present	Incumbent
Tasmanian Legislative Council
New division	Member for Prosser; 2018–2024	Succeeded by Kerry Vincent
