= 2002 Tasmanian state election =

State election in Australia

- 20 July 2002

All 25 seats to the House of Assembly 13 seats needed for a majority

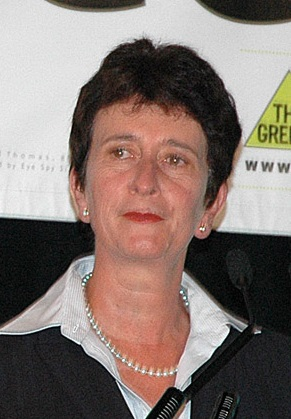
	First party	Second party	Third party
Leader	Jim Bacon	Bob Cheek	Peg Putt
Party	Labor	Liberal	Greens
Leader since	14 April 1997	20 August 2001	29 August 1998
Leader's seat	Denison	Denison (lost seat)	Denison
Last election	14 seats	10 seats	1 seat
Seats won	14	7	4
Seat change	Steady	▼3	▲3
Popular vote	153,798	81,185	53,746
Percentage	51.88%	27.38%	18.13%
Swing	▲7.09	▼10.67	▲7.95
- Results of the election
Premier before election
Jim Bacon
Labor
Elected Premier
Jim Bacon
Labor

A general election for the Tasmanian House of Assembly was held on Saturday 20 July 2002. The Labor government led by Premier Jim Bacon won a second term against the Liberal Party Opposition headed by Opposition Leader Bob Cheek in a landslide. The election was marked by a strong swing to both the Labor Party and the Tasmanian Greens at the expense of the Liberals, with Cheek losing his own seat.

Bacon and the Labor Party campaigned on a platform of revitalising the state after the 1990s-era economic reforms of successive Liberal governments, while maintaining law and order and a strong economy, and promoting tourism in particular. In response, Cheek and the Liberals claimed that the government had abandoned small business and promised a wide range of spending initiatives - something that was seized upon by Bacon as a means of attacking the Liberals' economic credentials. The Tasmanian Greens, under leader Peg Putt, campaigned as an alternative to both major parties, concentrating on environmental issues, which are often an area of bipartisan agreement among the Tasmanian major parties.

The results of the election were somewhat unexpected. The government retained its 14 seats in the 25-member parliament and recorded a swing in their favour in all five electorates. The Liberal Party had held ten seats before the election, but lost three to the Greens, who subsequently went from one to four seats. The Greens gained 18.1% of the statewide vote, their highest on record. In the Hobart-based seat of Denison, the Greens polled 24.5%, outpolling the main Opposition Liberal Party.

The election had major impacts on both the Liberals and Tasmanian Greens, while leaving Labor largely unchanged. The Liberals suffered a swing of over 10 percent and lost three seats, including that of their leader, Bob Cheek–the first major-party leader in Tasmania to lose his own seat since 1903. Rene Hidding was elected as his successor.

In contrast to the misfortune of the Liberal Party, the election saw the unexpected revival of the Greens. The reduction of the size of the Assembly in 1998, from 35 to 25, had increased the quota necessary to win a seat to 16.7%. Both major parties portrayed this as a way to cut the costs of government, but the Greens saw it as an attempt to eradicate them. At the 1998 election, all of their MPs except one, Peg Putt, were defeated. However, they managed to markedly increase their vote in the 2002 poll, and picked up three new MPs, Kim Booth, Nick McKim and Tim Morris.

== Results ==
Summary of the Results of the 2002 Tasmanian state election, House of Assembly
Party	Votes	%	+/–	Seats	+/–
Labor	153,798	51.88	▲7.09	14	Steady
Liberal	81,185	27.38	▼10.67	7	▼3
Greens	53,746	18.13	▲7.95	4	▲3
Democrats	2,019	0.68	▼0.21	0	Steady
Socialist Alliance	722	0.24	▲0.21	0	Steady
Tasmania First	529	0.18	▼4.92	0	Steady
Independents	4,471	1.51	▲0.52	0	Steady
Total	296,470	100.00	–	25	–
Valid votes	296,470	95.13			
Invalid/blank votes	15,167	4.87			
Total votes	311,637	100.00			
Registered voters/turnout	332,473	93.73			

=== Primary vote by division ===
	Bass	Braddon	Denison	Franklin	Lyons
Labor Party	49.1%	53.2%	50.8%	51.7%	54.6%
Liberal Party	31.4%	33.1%	22.9%	23.7%	25.7%
Tasmanian Greens	16.5%	12.0%	24.5%	20.4%	17.2%
Other	3.0%	1.7%	1.7%	4.2%	2.6%

=== Distribution of seats ===
Electorate	Seats held
Bass	
Braddon	
Denison	
Franklin	
Lyons	

Labor
Liberal
Green

== See also ==
- Members of the Tasmanian House of Assembly, 2002-2006
- Candidates of the 2002 Tasmanian state election
