= Electoral division of Western Tiers =

Former Tasmanian Legislative Council electoral division

Western Tiers Tasmania—Legislative Council
- State: Tasmania
- Created: 2008
- Abolished: 2017
- Namesake: Great Western Tiers
- Electors: 24,244 (January 2015)
- Area: 9,849 km^{2} (3,802.7 sq mi)

The electoral division of Western Tiers was an electorate of the Tasmanian Legislative Council, the division was abolished in 2017. The seat was created in 2008 after a redistribution saw the former Rowallan renamed after the Great Western Tiers mountain range in Tasmania's central highlands (the word "Great" was omitted for simplicity).

== Members ==
Member	Party	Period
Greg Hall	Independent	2008–2017

== See also ==
- Electoral division of Rowallan
- Tasmanian House of Assembly
