= Silvia Smith =

Australian politician (1939–2020)

Member of the Australian Parliament for Bass
- In office 13 March 1993 – 2 March 1996
- Preceded by: Warwick Smith
- Succeeded by: Warwick Smith

Personal details
- Born: 22 December 1939 Wivenhoe, Tasmania, Australia
- Died: 6 March 2020 (aged 80) Melbourne, Victoria, Australia
- Party: Labor
- Spouse: Jack Smith
- Children: 2
- Profession: Schoolteacher

Silvia Joy Smith (22 December 1939 – 6 March 2020) was an Australian politician. She was a member of the Australian Labor Party (ALP), serving in the Australian House of Representatives from 1993 to 1996 and the Tasmanian Legislative Council from 1997 to 2003.

== Early life ==
Smith was born on 22 December 1939 in Wivenhoe, Tasmania. She worked as a schoolteacher from 1959 to 1988.

== Politics ==
Smith was an officeholder in the ALP's West Launceston branch and was a delegate to the party's state council from 1987. She was elected to the House of Representatives at the 1993 federal election, winning Bass for the ALP from the incumbent Liberal MP Warwick Smith. She was elected with a narrow margin of 40 votes on the two-party-preferred count.

In parliament, Smith served on the House standing committees on community affairs and employment, education and training. Her Liberal predecessor Warwick Smith reclaimed the seat at the 1996 election. In 1997, she ran for and was elected to the Tasmanian Legislative Council electorate of Windermere as an Independent Labor candidate. She served for one six-year term before being defeated by conservative independent Ivan Dean, at the 2003 periodic elections.

== Personal life ==
Smith had two daughters with her husband Jack. They were also foster parents to several other children.

Smith died on 6 March 2020, aged 80, having been diagnosed with Parkinson's disease 15 years earlier.

Parliament of Australia
Preceded by Warwick Smith	Member for Bass; 1993–1996	Succeeded by Warwick Smith
Tasmanian Legislative Council
Preceded by George Brookes	Member for Westmorland; 1997–1999	Abolished
New seat	Member for Windermere; 1999–2003	Succeeded by Ivan Dean
