= Heather Butler =

Australian politician

Heather Butler AM

Member of the Tasmanian House of Assembly for Lyons
- In office 10 May 2005 – 20 March 2010
- Preceded by: Ken Bacon

Personal details
- Born: 6 November 1947 (age 78) Hampton, Victoria, Australia
- Party: Labor Party
- Children: Jen Butler
- Occupation: Teacher, social worker

Heather Rose Butler AM (born 6 November 1947) is an Australian former politician. Born in Hampton in Melbourne, Victoria, she was elected to the Tasmanian House of Assembly as a Labor member for Lyons in 2005 in a recount caused by the resignation of Ken Bacon. She was defeated in 2010.

In 2005, Butler was inducted to the Tasmanian Honour Roll of Women for service to tourism and to the community.

Butler had previously been awarded the Medal of the Order of Australia before she was advanced to a Member of the Order of Australia in the 2012 Queen's birthday honours.
