= Greg Hall (politician) =

Australian politician (born 1948)

Greg Hall AM

Member of the Legislative Council for McIntyre
- In office 5 August 2017 – 5 May 2018 Serving with Tania Rattray
- Preceded by: Division created
- Succeeded by: Tania Rattray

Member of the Legislative Council for Western Tiers
- In office 10 May 2008 – 5 August 2017
- Preceded by: Division created

Member of the Legislative Council for Rowallan
- In office 5 May 2001 – 10 May 2008
- Preceded by: John Loone
- Succeeded by: Division abolished

Personal details
- Born: 19 April 1948 (age 77) Launceston, Tasmania
- Party: Independent

Military service
- Allegiance: Australia
- Branch/service: Australian Army
- Years of service: 1969–1970
- Rank: Trooper
- Unit: B Squadron, 3rd Cavalry Regiment
- Battles/wars: Vietnam War

Gregory Raymond Hall AM (born 19 April 1948) is a former independent member of the Tasmanian Legislative Council in the McIntyre. He was also Mayor of the Meander Valley Council from 1997 to 2002. Hall was born in Launceston. He became a member of the Legislative Council at the 2001 Rowallan elections, defeating Russel Anderson (independent; supported by the Liberals).

Hall has supported some of state Labor's initiatives in the upper house, such as the Meander dam project and the Betfair proposal. He was one of only two independent members of the council to support the 2003 Relationships Act which gave same-sex unions and other relationships recognition in Tasmania. Hall voted against the governments Sex regulation Act and supported later legislation to ban brothels in Tasmania.

He stood for re-election again for the 6 May 2006 Rowallan division election, winning with a primary vote of 81.95% against a sole Tasmanian Greens opponent. In 2017, Hall's seat of Western Tiers was abolished in a redistribution. Hall was allocated to the seat of McIntyre alongside Tania Rattray until the expiration of his term in 2018.

Greg Hall is a Vietnam war veteran. He served as a Trooper with B Squadron, 3 Cav from 28 August 1969 to 4 June 1970. Hall was awarded Member of the Order of Australia (AM) in the 2021 Australia Day Honours, for "For significant service to the people and Parliament of Tasmania, and to agriculture and horticulture."

Tasmanian Legislative Council
Preceded by John Loone	Member for Rowallan; 2001–2008	Division abolished
New division	Member for Western Tiers; 2008–2017	Division abolished
New division	Member for McIntyre; 2017–2018; Served alongside: Tania Rattray	Succeeded by Tania Rattray
