= Electoral division of Apsley =

Former Tasmanian Legislative Council electoral division

Apsley Tasmania—Legislative Council
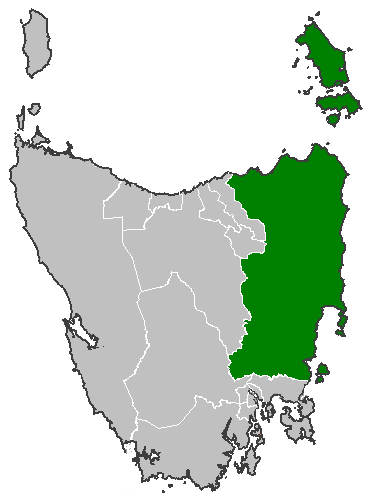
- State: Tasmania
- Created: 1999
- Abolished: 2017
- Namesake: Apsley River (Lord Apsley)
- Electors: 23,424 (January 2015)
- Area: 19,204 km^{2} (7,414.7 sq mi)

The electoral division of Apsley was an electorate of the Tasmanian Legislative Council, it was created in 1999 and abolished in 2017.

The total area of the division was 19,204 square kilometres (7,415 sq mi). As of 31 January 2015, there were 23,424 enrolled voters in the division.

The division was created in 1999 and named after the Apsley River, named after Lord Apsley, Earl Bathurst, and included the towns of Pipers River, Scottsdale, Evandale, Swansea, Derby, Lilydale, Bridport, Campbell Town, Colebrook, St Helens, Branxholm, Avoca, Fingal, Bicheno, Bagdad, Bellingham, Tomahawk, Ross, St Marys, Rossarden and many others.

== Members ==
Member	Party	Term
Colin Rattray	Independent	1999–2004
Tania Rattray(-Wagner)	Independent	2004–2017

== See also ==
- Tasmanian House of Assembly
