= Jim Bacon (politician) =

Australian politician and 41st Premier of Tasmania

The Honourable Jim Bacon AC

41st Premier of Tasmania
- In office 14 September 1998 – 21 March 2004
- Monarch: Elizabeth II
- Governor: Sir Guy Green; Richard Butler
- Deputy: Paul Lennon
- Preceded by: Tony Rundle
- Succeeded by: Paul Lennon

Leader of the Opposition
- In office 14 April 1997 – 14 September 1998
- Premier: Tony Rundle
- Preceded by: Michael Field
- Succeeded by: Tony Rundle

Member of the Tasmanian House of Assembly for Denison
- In office 24 February 1996 – 21 March 2004
- Preceded by: Julian Amos
- Succeeded by: David Bartlett

Personal details
- Born: 15 May 1950 Melbourne, Victoria, Australia
- Died: 20 June 2004 (aged 54) Hobart, Tasmania, Australia
- Party: Labor
- Other political affiliations: CPA (ML) (until 1991)

James Alexander Bacon, AC (15 May 1950 – 20 June 2004) was an Australian politician who served as Premier of Tasmania from 1998 to 2004.

== Early life ==
Bacon was born on 15 May 1950 in Melbourne; his father Frank, a doctor, died when Jim was twelve, leaving him to be raised by his mother Joan. He was educated at Scotch College and later studied politics at Monash University, but did not graduate. At Monash, Bacon was a Maoist student leader. Bacon moved to Western Australia and, after taking a job as a labourer, became an official of the Builders Labourers Federation, which then sent him to Tasmania as an organiser. He later became leader of the trade union movement as Secretary of the Tasmanian Trades & Labor Council.

Bacon joined the Tasmanian branch of the Labor Party, and was elected to the House of Assembly in 1996, representing the Hobart-based seat of Denison. He became leader of the Tasmanian Labor Party in 1997 and narrowly won the state election in 1998, defeating the Liberal Party government under Tony Rundle. It was the first Labor majority since 1982. His government was re-elected in 2002 in a landslide victory for his party.

== Premier ==
Bacon's time in office was said to have been hugely successful, for the state economy as a whole, for his popularity with the people of the state, and also for tourism with the introduction of two more Bass Strait ferries, and beginning a ferry run between Devonport and Sydney. He controversially appointed Richard Butler to the office Governor of Tasmania in 2003. One of the Bacon Government's most notable achievements was to wipe out a $1.6 billion state net debt in only six years. Other achievements included huge increases in tourist numbers, leading social policies, partnerships between state and local governments, turning Tasmanian Government entities, such as Hydro Tasmania, into profit-generating businesses (one of the election-winning strategies was to propose this as opposed to selling them), bringing two Australian Football League (AFL) clubs to play regular home and away matches in Tasmania (Hawthorn Football Club and St Kilda Football Club) and improving the general feeling of confidence in individuals and businesses within the state of Tasmania.

== Illness and death ==
On 13 February 2004, Bacon received the diagnosis that he was suffering from inoperable lung cancer. On 23 February 2004, he announced that he would take a four-week leave of absence from his role of Premier so that he could explore treatment options. After news that he had little time left, Bacon stood aside as Premier on 21 March 2004 and also resigned his seat in parliament, to spend whatever time was left to him with his family and friends. Paul Lennon, who had been Deputy Premier, succeeded Bacon to become Tasmania's Premier. Bacon, whose cancer was believed to be caused by long-term heavy smoking, became a vocal anti-smoking advocate in his final months.

Bacon died as a result of his cancer on 20 June 2004, at Calvary Hospital in Hobart. A state funeral was held on 24 June; many state and federal politicians (from both major parties) attended, including Liberal Prime Minister John Howard, all the state Premiers, Opposition Leader Mark Latham, former Opposition Leader Simon Crean, and former Prime Minister Gough Whitlam.

== Honours and legacy ==
In 2001 Bacon was awarded an honorary citizenship by Xi Jinping, then governor of Fujian Province. Bacon had first visited China while at university.

He was posthumously awarded the degree of Doctor of Laws honoris causa from the University of Tasmania in August 2004.

His appointment as a Companion of the Order of Australia was announced in June 2005 but made effective from 13 May 2004. The Order of Australia is not awarded posthumously, but Bacon had been nominated before his death.

The Jim Bacon Foundation was established in his honour to "provide practical support and financial assistance to cancer patients and their families by making funds available to organisations that offer cancer treatment and palliative care services". The Foundation was absorbed into the Ricky Ponting Foundation in May 2013. The State Government will continue to fund the $30,000 Jim Bacon Memorial Scholarship at the University of Tasmania.

== Personal ==
Jim Bacon had four sisters: Jenny, Wendy, Janet and Mary.

Bacon had a twenty-year partnership with Lynnette Francis, and they had two sons, Mark and Scott. Scott Bacon was elected to the Tasmanian House of Assembly at the 2010 state election.

Later Bacon married Honey Hogan, who had been a croupier and the public face of Australia's first casino: Wrest Point Hotel Casino when it opened in 1973. That marriage gave him a stepson, Shane.

== See also ==
- Political families of Australia

Political offices
Preceded by Michael Field	Opposition Leader of Tasmania; 1997–1998	Succeeded by Tony Rundle
Preceded by Tony Rundle	Premier of Tasmania; 1998–2004	Succeeded by Paul Lennon
Party political offices
Preceded by Michael Field	Leader of the Labor Party in Tasmania; 1997–2004	Succeeded by Paul Lennon
