= Ivan Dean =

Australian politician

Ivan Dean AM, APM

Member of the Legislative Council for Windermere
- In office 3 May 2003 – 1 May 2021
- Preceded by: Silvia Smith
- Succeeded by: Nick Duigan

Mayor of Launceston
- In office 2005–2007
- Preceded by: Janie Dickenson
- Succeeded by: Albert Van Zetten

Personal details
- Born: 21 April 1945 (age 81) Hobart, Tasmania
- Occupation: Police officer, soldier, farmer

Ivan Noel Dean AM, APM (born 21 April 1945) is an Australian politician. He was an independent member of the Tasmanian Legislative Council from 2003 to 2021, representing the electorate of Windermere. He also served as Mayor of Launceston from 2005 to 2007.

Dean studied at Levendale State School, New Town High School and Charles Sturt University. He also received training at the Tasmania Police Academy and the Victoria Police Academy.

Dean worked as a farmer, as an officer in the Australian Army during the Indonesia–Malaysia confrontation, and later as a police officer for Victoria Police, New South Wales Police Force and Tasmania Police, where he rose to the rank of Commander before being elected mayor of Launceston, on 31 October 2005. Dean faced criticism that it was 'irresponsible' to hold two positions in two separate government branches (a member of the legislative council and mayor).

In the October Launceston City Council elections; Ivan defeated incumbent Mayor Janie Dickenson. This was somewhat unexpected. On the first day of vote counting, The Examiner local newspaper ran a front-page headline claiming that Janie Dickenson was in front by 2000 votes and would secure her position as mayor and alderman. However, by the next day, Ivan had made a comeback and won by just 441 votes. As other mayoral candidates were excluded, Dean received the bulk of preferences (see single transferable vote).

After becoming mayor, Dean's supporters, including President of the Tasmanian Legislative Council Don Wing, said they believed him capable of holding both positions. Some in the community praised him as a man that follows up on inquiries. He suggested that councils in the north should consider merging or at least sharing resources more cooperatively but took no action to progress this.

In the legislative council Dean was known for anti tobacco efforts such as his Tobacco Free Generation private member's bill introduced in 2014 that would have prohibited the sale of tobacco products to anyone born after 2000.

Dean created controversy repeatedly claiming that the introduction of red foxes to Tasmania was a hoax, and made a number of allegations against the eradication program resulting in police and Integrity Commission investigations; none of which found any evidence to support his claims. As a police officer, Dean led an investigation into the illegal import of foxes into Tasmania which failed to gain any evidence of the repeated introductions and was criticised for the result.

He was defeated as Launceston mayor at the 2007 council elections, losing to challenger Albert Van Zetten in a surprise result that was attributed, in part, to his ability to hold two public offices and, in part, to Dean's support of a controversial pulp mill. He continued on as a member of the Legislative Council until 2021.

Tasmanian Legislative Council
Preceded by Silvia Smith	Member for Windermere; 2003–2021	Succeeded by Nick Duigan
Civic offices
Preceded by Janie Dickenson	Mayor of Launceston; 2005–2007	Succeeded by Albert Van Zetten
