= Electoral division of Windermere =

Tasmanian Legislative Council electoral division

Windermere Tasmania—Legislative Council
- Map showing the electoral division of Windermere, as of the 2017 periodic review.
- State: Tasmania
- Created: 1999
- MP: Nick Duigan
- Party: Liberal
- Electors: 27,342 (2021)
- Area: 2,047 km^{2} (790.4 sq mi)
- Demographic: Rural
- Federal electorate(s): Bass
- Coordinates: 41.275°S 147.216°E
Electorates around Windermere:
Bass Strait	Bass Strait	Bass Strait
Rosevears	Windermere	McIntyre
Launceston	McIntyre	McIntyre

The electoral division of Windermere is one of the 15 electorates in the Tasmanian Legislative Council. The division is located on the East side of the Tamar River. It is named after the town of Windermere which is located along the banks of the river between Launceston and George Town.

Within the electorate are the towns of George Town, Low Head, Windermere, Dilston, Relbia, Hillwood and Bell Bay. The Launceston suburbs of Rocherlea, Newnham, Mowbray, Mayfield, Ravenswood, St Leonards, Elphin and Waverley.

The voting population in keeping with other divisional boundaries is approximately 26,000 voters. The current sitting member is Liberal Nick Duigan. The boundaries of Windermere were determined by a redistribution which occurred in 2017.

== Members ==
Member	Party	Period
Silvia Smith	Independent	1999–2003
Ivan Dean	Independent	2003–2021
Nick Duigan	Liberal	2021–present

== Election results ==
2021 Tasmanian Legislative Council periodic elections: Windermere
Party	Candidate	Votes	%	±%
Liberal	Nick Duigan	8,048	37.83	+37.83
Labor	Geoff Lyons	5,746	27.01	−1.52
Independent	Will Smith	4,521	21.25	+21.25
Independent	Rob Soward	2,071	9.73	+9.73
Independent	Vivienne Gale	890	4.18	+4.18
Total formal votes		21,276	95.15	+0.44
Informal votes		1,084	4.85	−0.44
Turnout		22,360	81.78	+3.17
Registered electors		27,342		
Two-party-preferred result
Liberal	Nick Duigan	11,400	54.14	+54.14
Labor	Geoff Lyons	9,658	45.86	+1.56
Liberal gain from Independent				

== See also ==
- Tasmanian House of Assembly
