= Bryan Green =

Australian politician (born 1957)

The Honourable Bryan Green

50th Leader of the Opposition of Tasmania
- In office 31 March 2014 – 17 March 2017
- Premier: Will Hodgman
- Deputy: Michelle O'Byrne
- Preceded by: Will Hodgman
- Succeeded by: Rebecca White

Deputy Premier of Tasmania
- In office 24 January 2011 – 31 March 2014
- Premier: Lara Giddings
- Preceded by: Lara Giddings
- Succeeded by: Jeremy Rockliff
- In office 5 April 2006 – 15 July 2006
- Premier: Paul Lennon
- Preceded by: David Llewellyn
- Succeeded by: Steve Kons

Member of the Tasmanian House of Assembly for Braddon
- In office 29 August 1998 – 17 March 2017

Personal details
- Born: 30 June 1957 (age 69) Wollongong, New South Wales, Australia
- Party: Labor
- Occupation: Machinist, union organiser

Bryan Alexander Green (born 30 June 1957) is a former Australian politician. He was the leader of the parliamentary Labor Party in Tasmania from 2014 to 2017, and a member of the Tasmanian House of Assembly in the electorate of Braddon from 1998 to 2017.

== Early life ==
A native of New South Wales, Green was born in Wollongong on June 30, 1957. His family later moved to George Town, Tasmania and then to Burnie, Tasmania, where he attended Burnie High School and Burnie Technical College.

From 1974 to 1993, he worked as a machinist for the Burnie mills of Australian Paper. He then spent three years as an electorate officer for Senator Kay Denman, and then several years as a state organiser for the Australian Manufacturing Workers Union (AMWU).

== Political career ==
Green entered the Tasmanian parliament at the 1998 election. He was appointed to the ministerial portfolio of Primary Industries, Water and Environment in 2002. Following a reshuffle precipitated by the resignation of Premier Jim Bacon due to ill-health, Green was promoted to Minister of Infrastructure, Energy and Resources in 2004.

As Minister for Primary Industries, Water and Environment, Green was responsible for obtaining Parliamentary support for construction of the Meander Dam, a major water project that was opposed by conservationists. As Transport Minister he proposed lowering the states speed limits on rural roads from 100 km/h to 90 km/h, a proposition that was met with somewhat of a backlash. Green was later appointed as the chairman of the Tasmanian Road Safety Council. He was the key negotiator with freight rail company Pacific National, which in September 2005 threatened to 'pull out' of intermodal operations in the State, forcing all containerised and coal rail freight onto the road. He agreed to a $120 million rescue package ($80 million funded by the Australian federal government) to the company.

On 14 July 2006 Green resigned from all leadership and frontbench positions following an enquiry by Auditor-General Mike Blake into a deal Green signed with Tasmanian Compliance Corporation (TCC). The deal promised the TCC company, part-owned by two former Labor ministers (John White and Glen Milliner), a three-year exclusive business monopoly from the Government or $2.5 million compensation. Green faced trial in December 2007 on charges of conspiracy and attempting to interfere with an executive officer, which ended in a hung jury. A 2008 retrial also ended in a hung jury, with the DPP subsequently dropping the charges. Green was reelected in 2010 and 2014.

In 2011 Lara Giddings succeeded David Bartlett as Premier, and Green became Deputy Premier. In March 2014, following the resignation of Giddings, Green was elected Labor leader in Tasmania after gaining unanimous support from colleagues.

As Green was Giddings' deputy prior to his elevation as leader, this marked the fourth time in a row that the Tasmanian ALP leader had been succeeded by his or her deputy.

Green's political achievements included restructuring Tasmania's four port companies into a single entity, supporting a wide-ranging review into public passenger transport services, and increasing transparency in the forestry sector, through changes to Freedom of Information laws and by supporting the role of the Forest Practices Authority.

On the morning of 17 March 2017, Green told a party meeting that he was retiring from politics. Shadow health minister Rebecca White was elected unopposed to replace him, and Green's seat in Braddon was filled by a recount. He was the first Tasmanian Labor leader in decades not to take the party into an election.

In December 2023, Labor Leader Rebecca White announced Green as Labor's candidate for the Legislative Council seat of Prosser in the 2024 periodic elections.

Political offices
Preceded by David Llewellyn	Deputy Premier of Tasmania; 2006	Succeeded by Steve Kons
Preceded by Lara Giddings	Deputy Premier of Tasmania; 2011–2014	Succeeded by Jeremy Rockliff
Preceded by Will Hodgman	Leader of the Opposition (Tasmania); 2014–2017	Succeeded by Rebecca White
Party political offices
Preceded by Lara Giddings	Leader of the Labor Party in Tasmania; 2014–2017	Succeeded by Rebecca White
