= Members of the Tasmanian House of Assembly, 2010–2014 =

This is a list of members of the Tasmanian House of Assembly, elected at the 2010 state election.

Name	Party	Electorate	Term in office
Elise Archer	Liberal	Denison	2010–2023
Scott Bacon	Labor	Denison	2010–2019
Hon David Bartlett^{[1]}	Labor	Denison	2004–2011
Brenton Best	Labor	Braddon	1996–2014
Kim Booth	Greens	Bass	2002–2015
Adam Brooks	Liberal	Braddon	2010–2019, 2021
Michael Ferguson	Liberal	Bass	2010–present
Hon Lara Giddings	Labor	Franklin	1996–1998, 2002–2018
Bryan Green	Labor	Braddon	1998–2017
Matthew Groom	Liberal	Denison	2010–2018
Peter Gutwein	Liberal	Bass	2002–2022
Rene Hidding	Liberal	Lyons	1996–2019
Hon Will Hodgman	Liberal	Franklin	2002–2020
Hon Nick McKim	Greens	Franklin	2002–2015
Tim Morris	Greens	Lyons	2002–2014
David O'Byrne	Labor	Franklin	2010–2014, 2018–present
Hon Michelle O'Byrne	Labor	Bass	2006–2025
Hon Cassy O'Connor	Greens	Denison	2008–2023
Paul O'Halloran	Greens	Braddon	2010–2014
Jacquie Petrusma	Liberal	Franklin	2010–2022, 2024–present
Hon Michael Polley	Labor	Lyons	1972–2014
Jeremy Rockliff	Liberal	Braddon	2002–present
Mark Shelton	Liberal	Lyons	2010–present
Graeme Sturges^{[1]}	Labor	Denison	2002–2010, 2011–2014
Rebecca White	Labor	Lyons	2010–2025
Brian Wightman	Labor	Bass	2010–2014

^{1} Labor MHA for Denison and former Premier of Tasmania, David Bartlett, resigned on 16 May 2011. Graeme Sturges was elected as his replacement on 26 May 2011.

== Distribution of seats ==
Electorate	Seats held
Bass	
Braddon	
Denison	
Franklin	
Lyons	

Labor – 10 seats (40%)
Liberal – 10 seats (40%)
Green – 5 seats (20%)

== See also ==
- List of past members of the Tasmanian House of Assembly
