= Members of the Tasmanian House of Assembly, 2014–2018 =

This is a list of members of the Tasmanian House of Assembly, elected at the 2014 state election.

Name	Party	Electorate	Years in office
Hon Elise Archer	Liberal	Denison	2010–2023
Scott Bacon	Labor	Denison	2010–2019
Guy Barnett	Liberal	Lyons	2014–present
Kim Booth ^{1}	Greens	Bass	2002–2015
Dr Shane Broad ^{4}	Labor	Braddon	2017–present
Hon Adam Brooks	Liberal	Braddon	2010–2019, 2021
Sarah Courtney	Liberal	Bass	2014–2022
Andrea Dawkins ^{1}	Greens	Bass	2015–2018
Hon Michael Ferguson	Liberal	Bass	2010–present
Lara Giddings	Labor	Franklin	1996–1998, 2002–2018
Bryan Green ^{4}	Labor	Braddon	1998–2017
Hon Matthew Groom	Liberal	Denison	2010–2018
Hon Peter Gutwein	Liberal	Bass	2002–2022
Hon Paul Harriss ^{3}	Liberal	Franklin	2014–2016
Hon Rene Hidding	Liberal	Lyons	1996–2019
Hon Will Hodgman	Liberal	Franklin	2002–2020
Roger Jaensch	Liberal	Braddon	2014–present
David Llewellyn	Labor	Lyons	1986–2010, 2014–2018
Nick McKim ^{2}	Greens	Franklin	2002–2015
Michelle O'Byrne	Labor	Bass	2006–2025
Cassy O'Connor	Greens	Denison	2008–2023
Madeleine Ogilvie	Labor	Denison	2014–2018, 2019–present
Hon Jacquie Petrusma	Liberal	Franklin	2010–2022, 2024–present
Hon Jeremy Rockliff	Liberal	Braddon	2002–present
Joan Rylah	Liberal	Braddon	2014–2018, 2019–2020
Mark Shelton	Liberal	Lyons	2010–present
Nic Street ^{3}	Liberal	Franklin	2016–2018, 2020–2025
Rebecca White	Labor	Lyons	2010–2025
Dr Rosalie Woodruff ^{2}	Greens	Franklin	2015–present

^{1} Greens MHA for Bass Kim Booth resigned on 20 May 2015. He was replaced in a countback held on 9 June 2015 by Andrea Dawkins.
^{2} Greens MHA for Franklin Nick McKim resigned on 4 August 2015 to take up appointment to the Australian Senate seat vacated by Christine Milne. He was replaced in a countback held on 17 August 2015 by Rosalie Woodruff.
^{3} Liberal MHA for Franklin Paul Harriss resigned on 17 February 2016. He was replaced in a countback held on 1 March 2016 by Nic Street.
^{4} Labor MHA for Braddon and Opposition Leader Bryan Green resigned on 17 March 2017. He was replaced in a countback held on 3 April 2017 by Shane Broad.

== Distribution of seats ==
Electorate	Seats held
Bass	
Braddon	
Denison	
Franklin	
Lyons	

Liberal – 15 seats (60%)
Labor – 7 seats (28%)
Greens – 3 seats (12%)

== See also ==
- List of past members of the Tasmanian House of Assembly
