= Same-sex marriage in Tasmania =

Same-sex marriage has been legal in Tasmania, and in the rest of Australia, since 9 December 2017 following passage in the Parliament of the Marriage Amendment (Definition and Religious Freedoms) Act 2017. Prior to this, Tasmania recognised two distinct categories of registered partnerships in accordance with the Relationships Act 2003—significant relationships and caring relationships. The act, which came into effect on 1 January 2004, also amended 73 pieces of state legislation to provide registered partners with nearly all of the rights offered to married couples. Furthermore, since July 2009, these relationships are recognised at the federal level, providing couples with almost all of the federal rights and benefits of marriage. In September 2010, the Parliament of Tasmania approved legislation to recognize same-sex unions performed outside Tasmania as significant relationships.

A bill to legalise same-sex marriage was introduced to the Tasmanian Parliament in August 2012. The bill passed the House of Assembly 13–11, but was later rejected 6–8 by the Legislative Council on 28 September 2012.

== Registered partnerships ==
The Relationships Act 2003, which came into force on 1 January 2004, recognises two types of registered partnerships—significant relationships and caring relationships. Both same-sex and opposite-sex couples can register a significant relationship provided they are unrelated, unmarried adults resident in Tasmania. Likewise, two adults residing in the state, related or not, can register a caring relationship if one provides the other with domestic support and personal care. The parties cannot be married to each other, cannot be in an existing significant or caring relationship, and neither can be receiving payment for the care of the other either from employment or government departments. Both types of relationships provide some rights in the following areas: superannuation, taxation, insurance, health care, hospital visitation, wills, property division, and employment conditions such as parental and bereavement leave. Applications for significant or caring relationships can be registered in person or by mail by filing an application for a relationship certificate (also known as a "deed of relationship") with the Tasmanian Registry of Births, Deaths and Marriages.

Tasmanian law allows same-sex couples to adopt. The Adoption Act 1988 states that "an order for the adoption of a child may be made in favour of two persons who, for a period of not less than 3 years before the date on which the order is made, have been married to each other or have been the parties to a significant relationship which is the subject of a deed of relationship registered under Part 2 of the Relationships Act 2003." The Adoption Act 1988 was amended by the Parliament in 2013 to allow same-sex couples to adopt children unrelated to either partner. A bill to this effect passed the House of Assembly in April 2013, after the Liberal Party granted its members a conscience vote on the issue. It passed the Legislative Council by 10 votes to 3 in July 2013. Tasmania was the fourth jurisdiction in Australia to grant same-sex couples full adoption rights, joining New South Wales, Western Australia and the Australian Capital Territory (ACT).

Under the Status of Children Act 1974, the same-sex partner of a woman who conceives children through sperm donation, in vitro fertilisation or other assisted reproductive technologies is presumed to be the child's legal parent or co-mother—just as male partners of heterosexual women are. Both mothers can be listed on the birth certificate, granting them equal parental rights, including access to medical, educational and legal entitlements for the child. This legislation is retrospective, meaning it also applies to co-mothers of children born before the law was enacted. Additionally, under the Adoption Act 1988, the birth mother's same-sex partner can adopt a child conceived through fertility treatment via the stepchild adoption provision. Altruistic surrogacy is also permitted following passage of two pieces of legislation in 2012—the Surrogacy Act 2012 and the Surrogacy (Consequential Amendments) Act 2012. The surrogate must be at least 25 years as age, and it cannot be her first pregnancy. The new altruistic surrogacy laws came into effect on 1 January 2013.

Significant and caring relationships registered in Tasmania are not automatically recognised in other parts of Australia when couples travel or move interstate. The government of Prime Minister Kevin Rudd, elected in 2007, had encouraged all states and territories to create relationship registers identical to Tasmania's, in order to "create nationwide uniformity and consistent rights", while at the same time not supporting any scheme appearing too similar to marriage. As of August 2017, the following jurisdictions recognised Tasmanian registered partnerships: the Australian Capital Territory, New South Wales, South Australia, Queensland and Victoria. The Commonwealth Government also recognises Tasmanian registered partnerships as de facto relationships under federal law. De facto couples, whether same-sex or opposite-sex, are entitled to nearly all of the federal rights of marriage since 1 July 2009. In September 2010, the Tasmanian Parliament passed legislation to recognize out-of-state same-sex unions as significant relationships.

== Same-sex marriage ==
=== Failed attempts in 2012 ===
In August 2012, Premier Lara Giddings announced that Tasmania would soon pass a law allowing same-sex couples to marry. Activist Rodney Croome called on the Parliament to pass the legislation, stating that it would "seal Tasmania's maturation as an inclusive society". The bill passed 13–11 in the House of Assembly on 30 August 2012 after more than four hours of debate. Premier Giddings welcomed the vote, saying, "And I too look forward to being able to celebrate engagement parties, weddings, attending receptions. I think there's a couple of people who are actually thinking of becoming celebrants. We're good talkers, us politicians." Leader of the Tasmanian Greens Nick McKim, who introduced the bill, said, "It's placed Tasmania as a national leader on a really important issue, a progressive issue, and I'm just so proud to be a member of a progressive government and tonight so proud to be a member of the Tasmanian Parliament."

30 August 2012 vote in the House of Assembly
Party	Voted for	Voted against	Absent (Did not vote)
Tasmanian Labor Party	9: Scott Bacon; Brenton Best; Lara Giddings; Bryan Green; David O'Byrne; Michelle O'Byrne; Graeme Sturges; Rebecca White; Brian Wightman	1: Michael Polley	–
Tasmanian Liberal Party	–	10: Elise Archer; Adam Brooks; Michael Ferguson; Matthew Groom; Peter Gutwein; Rene Hidding; Will Hodgman; Jacquie Petrusma; Jeremy Rockliff; Mark Shelton	–
Tasmanian Greens	4: Kim Booth; Nick McKim; Cassy O'Connor; Paul O'Halloran	–	1: Tim Morris
Total	13	11	1
Total	52.0%	44.0%	4.0%

After "two days of impassioned debate", the Legislative Council voted against the bill 6–8 on 27 September 2012. Opponents argued that the legislation violated Section 51(xxi) of the Constitution of Australia, which prescribes that marriage is a legislative power of the Parliament of Australia. These claims were confirmed in 2013 when the High Court struck down the ACT's Marriage Equality (Same Sex) Act 2013 as being inconsistent both because its definition of marriage conflicted with that in the federal Marriage Act 1961 and because the federal act was exclusive, leaving no room for any other definition in the legislation of a state or a territory.

27 September 2012 vote in the Legislative Council
Party	Voted for	Voted against	Absent (Did not vote)
Tasmanian Labor Party	1: Craig Farrell	–	–
Tasmanian Liberal Party	–	1: Vanessa Goodwin	–
Independent	5: Kerry Finch; Ruth Forrest; Mike Gaffney; Tony Mulder; Rob Valentine	7: Rosemary Armitage; Ivan Dean; Greg Hall; Paul Harriss; Tania Rattray; Adriana Taylor; Jim Wilkinson	1: Sue Smith
Total	6	8	1
Total	40.0%	53.3%	6.7%

On 19 November 2015, the House of Assembly passed a motion by a vote of 15–9 calling on the Commonwealth Government to pass a same-sex marriage bill and allow lawmakers to have a conscience vote on the issue. The Legislative Council approved the motion 8–5 on 9 August 2016. Western Australia and New South Wales also passed similar motions.

=== Federal legalisation in 2017 ===
The Parliament of Australia legalised same-sex marriage nationwide in December 2017 following passage of the Marriage Amendment (Definition and Religious Freedoms) Act 2017. The new law came into effect on 9 December 2017. The passage of the 2017 federal law followed a voluntary postal survey of all Australians, in which 61.6% of respondents supported the legalisation of same-sex marriage. Tasmania reported a "Yes" vote of 63.6%. The first same-sex marriage in Tasmania occurred on 3 January 2018 in Boat Harbour between Kirsty Albion and Kelly Albion (née Mackenzie). The couple had successfully applied for an exemption from the one-month waiting period; indeed, couples intending to marry must wait at least one month after signing a notice of intention to marry, meaning the first legal same-sex weddings in Australia were to take place from 9 January 2018. The first marriage for a couple who had not asked for an exemption occurred in Franklin on 9 January between Roz Kitschke and Lainey Carmichael.

=== Demographics and marriage statistics ===
According to the 2021 Australian census, there were 1,681 same-sex couples living in Tasmania, accounting for about 1.4% of all couples.

=== Religious performance ===
Most major religious organisations in Tasmania do not perform or bless same-sex marriages in their places of worship. The largest religious denomination permitting same-sex marriage is the Uniting Church in Australia. On 13 July 2018, its National Assembly approved the creation of marriage rites for same-sex couples. The change incorporated a gender-neutral definition of marriage in the Church's official statement, though also retained the existing statement on marriage as a heterosexual union, which the Church described as an "equal yet distinct" approach to the issue. Same-sex marriages have been permitted in the Uniting Church since 21 September 2018. Some other religious denominations support and solemnise same-sex marriages, including Buddhist groups, Reform Jewish groups, the Australia and New Zealand Unitarian Universalist Association, the Metropolitan Community Church, and Quakers.

== See also ==
- LGBT rights in Tasmania
- Same-sex marriage in Australia
