= Bartlett ministry =

Tasmanian parliamentary ministry

The Bartlett Ministry was a Ministry of the Government of Tasmania, and was led by Labor Premier David Bartlett and his deputy Lara Giddings. It succeeded the Lennon Ministry on 26 May 2008 due to the departure of Paul Lennon from politics. Following the 2010 state election, which reduced Labor to minority government, an agreement was formed with the Tasmanian Greens who held two cabinet positions. The Bartlett Ministry was dissolved on 23 January 2011 and was succeeded by the Giddings Ministry, after Bartlett resigned as Premier,

== First Ministry ==
Office	Minister
Premier; Minister for Education and Skills; Minister for Economic Development and Tourism (12–19 September 2008); Minister for Planning and Workplace Relations (24–27 November 2008)	David Bartlett, MP
Deputy Premier; Minister for Health (until 19 September 2008:) Minister for Human Services (from 19 September 2008:) Attorney-General Minister for Justice	Lara Giddings, MP
Treasurer; Minister for Racing (until 19 September 2008:) Attorney-General Minister for Justice (from 19 September 2008:) Minister for Economic Development	Michael Aird, MLC
Minister for Economic Development and Tourism	Paula Wriedt, MP (until 12 September 2008)
Minister for Police and Emergency Management; Minister for Local Government	Jim Cox, MP
Minister for Planning and Workplace Relations	Allison Ritchie, MP (until 24 November 2008)
Minister for Primary Industries and Water; Minister for Energy and Resources; Minister for Planning; Minister for Corrections and Consumer Protection (until 27 November 2008)	David Llewellyn, MP
Minister for the Environment, Parks and Heritage; Minister for Tourism (from 22 September 2008); Minister for the Arts; Minister for Sport and Recreation; Minister for Hospitality	Michelle O'Byrne, MP
Minister for Corrections and Consumer Protection; Minister for Workplace Relations; Minister Assisting the Premier on Climate Change	Lisa Singh, MP (from 27 November 2008)
Minister for Infrastructure; Minister for Veterans' Affairs	Graeme Sturges, MP
Minister for Human Services	Lin Thorp, MLC (from 19 September 2008)
Leader of Government Business in the Legislative Council	Doug Parkinson, MLC

== Second Ministry ==
The second Bartlett Ministry was formed on 21 April 2010, and contained two members of the Tasmanian Greens.

Office	Minister
Premier; Minister for Innovation, Science and Technology	David Bartlett, MP
Deputy Premier; Attorney-General; Minister for Justice; Minister for Economic Development; Minister for Infrastructure	Lara Giddings, MP
Treasurer; Minister for Industry	Michael Aird, MLC
Minister for Primary Industries and Water; Minister for Energy and Resources; Minister for Local Government; Minister for Planning; Minister for Racing; Minister for Veterans' Affairs	Bryan Green, MP
Minister for Human Services; Minister for Corrections and Consumer Protection; Minister for Community Development; Minister for Climate Change; Minister for Sustainable Transport and Alternative Energy	Nick McKim, MP
Minister for the Environment, Parks and Heritage; Minister for Workplace Relations; Minister for the Arts; Minister for Hospitality	David O'Byrne, MP
Minister for Health; Minister for Tourism	Michelle O'Byrne, MP
Minister for Education and Skills; Minister for Children; Minister for Police and Emergency Management	Lin Thorp, MLC
Secretary to Cabinet	Cassy O'Connor, MP
Leader of Government Business in the Legislative Council	Doug Parkinson, MLC

== Third Ministry ==
The third Bartlett Ministry was formed on 11 November 2010, and contained two members of the Tasmanian Greens.

Office	Minister
Premier; Minister for Innovation, Science and Technology	David Bartlett, MP
Deputy Premier; Attorney-General; Treasurer; Minister for Justice; Minister for Arts	Lara Giddings, MP
Minister for Primary Industries and Water; Minister for Energy and Resources; Minister for Local Government; Minister for Planning; Minister for Racing; Minister for Veterans' Affairs	Bryan Green, MP
Minister for Corrections and Consumer Protection; Minister for Climate Change; Minister for Sustainable Transport; Minister for Aboriginal Affairs	Nick McKim, MP
Minister for Infrastructure; Minister for Economic Development; Minister for Workplace Relations	David O'Byrne, MP
Secretary to Cabinet for Environment, Sport and Recreation, Hospitality	Brian Wightman, MP
Minister for Health; Minister for Tourism; Leader of Government Business	Michelle O'Byrne, MP
Minister for Education and Skills; Minister for Children; Minister for Police and Emergency Management	Lin Thorp, MLC
Minister for Human Services; Minister for Community Development	Cassy O'Connor, MP
Leader of Government Business in the Legislative Council	Doug Parkinson, MLC

== Notes ==
Parliament of Tasmania
Preceded by Lennon Ministry	Cabinet of Tasmania; 2008–2011	Succeeded by Giddings Ministry
