= Sarah Courtney =

Australian financial analyst, viticulturist and politician

The Honourable Sarah Courtney

Senator for Tasmania
- Designate
- Assuming office TBA
- Succeeding: Jonno Duniam

Member of the Tasmanian House of Assembly for Bass
- In office 31 March 2014 – 10 February 2022
- Succeeded by: Lara Alexander
Tasmanian Government (2018–22)
Minister for Education Minister for Children and Youth Minister for Disability Services
In office 19 May 2021 – 10 February 2022
Premier	Peter Gutwein
Preceded by	Jeremy Rockliff (as Minister for Education and Training); Roger Jaensch (as Minister for Disability Services and Community Development)
Succeeded by	Jeremy Rockliff (as Minister for Education); Roger Jaensch (as Minister for Children and Youth and Minister for Disability Services)
Minister for Tourism, Hospitality and Events Hospitality and Events (2021)
In office 19 May 2021 – 10 February 2022
Premier	Peter Gutwein
Preceded by	Peter Gutwein (as Minister for Tourism); Herself (as Minister for Small Business, Hospitality and Events)
Succeeded by	Guy Barnett
Minister for Skills, Training and Workforce Growth
In office 19 May 2021 – 10 February 2022
Premier	Peter Gutwein
Preceded by	Position established
Succeeded by	Guy Barnett
Minister for Small Business, Hospitality and Events
In office 28 January 2020 – 19 May 2021
Premier	Peter Gutwein
Preceded by	Michael Ferguson (as Minister for Small Business); Peter Gutwein (as Minister for Tourism, Hospitality and Events)
Succeeded by	Jane Howlett (as Minister for Small Business); Herself (as Minister for Hospitality and Events)
Minister for Strategic Growth
In office 28 January 2020 – 19 May 2021
Premier	Peter Gutwein
Preceded by	Position established
Succeeded by	Position abolished
Minister for Women
In office 2 July 2019 – 19 May 2021
Premier	Will Hodgman; Peter Gutwein
Preceded by	Jacquie Petrusma
Succeeded by	Jane Howlett
Minister for Health
In office 2 July 2019 – 19 May 2021
Premier	Will Hodgman; Peter Gutwein
Preceded by	Michael Ferguson
Succeeded by	Jeremy Rockliff
Minister for Resources Minister for Building and Construction
In office 31 October 2018 – 2 July 2019
Premier	Will Hodgman
Preceded by	Guy Barnett
Succeeded by	Guy Barnett (as Minister for Resources); Elise Archer (as Minister for Building and Construction)
Minister for Primary Industries and Water Minister for Racing
In office 21 March 2018 – 31 October 2018
Premier	Will Hodgman
Preceded by	Jeremy Rockliff
Succeeded by	Guy Barnett (as Minister for Primary Industries and Water); Elise Archer (as Minister for Racing)

Personal details
- Born: 1979 (age 46–47) Sydney, New South Wales, Australia
- Party: Liberal Party
- Education: University of Sydney; University of Melbourne
- Occupation: Viticulturist, financial analyst

Sarah Jane Courtney (born 1979) is an Australian financial analyst, viticulturist and a former politician. She was elected to the Tasmanian House of Assembly for the Liberal Party in the Division of Bass at the 2014 state election. As a Senior Minister in the Second Hodgman Ministry, First Gutwein Ministry, and Second Gutwein Ministry, Courtney was responsible for the policy development, service delivery and overall governance of a significant part of the public sector, including accountability for the multibillion-dollar health and education budgets.

== Political career ==
=== State politics ===
Sarah Courtney unsuccessfully stood for the Senate in the 2013 Australian federal election prior to her entry into state politics.

In March 2018, Courtney was appointed to the Second Hodgman Ministry as Minister for Primary Industries and Water, and Minister for Racing. In October 2018, she stepped down from the role of Minister for Primary Industries and Water while an investigation was carried out, after disclosing a personal relationship with John Whittington, the secretary of the Department of Primary Industries, Parks, Water and the Environment. The inquiry found that there was no inappropriate decision making by Courtney and that all official duties, decisions and actions of the Minister followed appropriate protocols and procedures but that she had breached the Ministerial Code of Conduct. Courtney subsequently became Minister for Resources and Minister for Building and Construction to avoid any conflict of interest. Courtney and Whittington later married in 2020.

In July 2019, Courtney was appointed Minister for Health and Minister for Women. As Health Minister, Courtney steered Tasmania through the COVID-19 pandemic, while concurrently overseeing the commissioning of K-Block at the Royal Hobart Hospital; the largest health infrastructure development ever delivered by the Tasmanian Government.

After the 2021 state election, Courtney was appointed Minister for Education, Minister for Skills, Training and Workforce Growth, Minister for Children and Youth, Minister for Hospitality and Events and Minister for Disability Services. As Minister for Children and Youth, Courtney drove the transition for the Ashley Youth Detention Centre to a new therapeutic model and oversaw the development of a nation-leading Youth Justice reform process.

In late January 2022, Courtney contracted COVID-19 while holidaying in France and due to isolation requirements was unable to return to Tasmania to oversee the back-to-school preparations for the start of the school year. She was publicly criticised by opposition parties for "holidaying in Europe for several weeks while stressed parents were preparing to send their children back to school". On 10 February 2022, Courtney announced her resignation from parliament and from the education portfolio. She denied her resignation was related to the criticism she faced for her holiday in France, but instead "was to spend more time with family". Her seat in Bass was filled by Lara Alexander in a countback of votes from the 2021 state election.

On 1 April 2022, Courtney was granted the right to retain the title "The Honourable" for life for her eight years in office.

=== Federal politics ===
In August 2026, Courtney was pre-selected to the second place on the Liberal Party senate ticket for the next federal election. She will first be appointed to the Senate in late 2026, replacing retiring Senator Jonno Duniam who is planning to resign mid-term.

== Corporate career ==
Prior to her political career, Sarah Courtney worked as an Institutional Sales & Equities Analyst at Lodge Partners, and as a Business Development Manager at Regal Funds Management. In September 2009, Courtney established Fish Hook Wines, a boutique vineyard in the Tamar Valley, Tasmania growing Pinot Noir.

In 2024, Courtney was announced as the chair of the Tasmanian Forest Products Association, a timber industry lobby group.
