= Hodgman ministry =

Tasmanian parliamentary ministry

The First Hodgman Ministry was the Cabinet of Tasmania from 31 March 2014 to 21 March 2018. It was created after the defeat of the Giddings Ministry at the 2014 Tasmanian state election, and was replaced by the Second Hodgman Ministry after the 2018 Tasmanian state election.

== First formation ==
Office	Minister	
Premier; Minister for Tourism, Hospitality and Events; Minister for Sport and Recreation; Minister for Aboriginal Affairs	Will Hodgman, MP	
Deputy Premier	Minister for Education and Training Minister for Primary Industries and Water; Minister for Racing	Jeremy Rockliff, MP
Minister for Health; Minister for Information Technology and Innovation; Leader of Government Business, House of Assembly	Michael Ferguson, MP	
Attorney-General; Minister for Justice; Minister for Corrections; Minister for the Arts; Leader for the Government, Legislative Council	Vanessa Goodwin, MLC	
Minister for State Growth; Minister for Energy; Minister for Environment, Parks and Heritage	Matthew Groom, MP	
Treasurer; Minister for Planning and Local Government	Peter Gutwein, MP	
Minister for Resources	Paul Harriss, MP	
Minister for Police and Emergency Management; Minister for Infrastructure	Rene Hidding, MP	
Minister for Human Services; Minister for Women	Jacquie Petrusma, MP	

== Second formation ==
Hodgman reshuffled his ministry on 18 February 2016, after Paul Harriss resigned from the cabinet and the parliament. Adam Brooks joined the cabinet, taking over Harriss's Resources portfolio (renamed as Minister for Mining), as well as the new portfolios of Consumer Affairs and Red Tape Reduction and Building and Construction, and the Racing portfolio previously held by Jeremy Rockliff. Treasurer Peter Gutwein was also appointed Minister for Forestry in addition to his other ministerial roles.

Office	Minister	
Premier; Minister for Tourism, Hospitality and Events; Minister for Sport and Recreation; Minister for Aboriginal Affairs	Will Hodgman, MP	
Deputy Premier	Minister for Education and Training Minister for Primary Industries and Water	Jeremy Rockliff, MP
Minister for Building and Construction; Minister for Consumer Affairs and Red Tape Reduction; Minister for Mining; Minister for Racing	Adam Brooks, MP	
Minister for Health; Minister for Information Technology and Innovation; Leader of Government Business, House of Assembly	Michael Ferguson, MP	
Attorney-General; Minister for Justice; Minister for Corrections; Minister for the Arts; Leader for the Government, Legislative Council	Vanessa Goodwin, MLC	
Minister for State Growth; Minister for Energy; Minister for Environment, Parks and Heritage	Matthew Groom, MP	
Treasurer; Minister for Planning and Local Government; Minister for Forestry	Peter Gutwein, MP	
Minister for Police and Emergency Management; Minister for Infrastructure	Rene Hidding, MP	
Minister for Human Services; Minister for Women	Jacquie Petrusma, MP	

== Third formation ==
On 9 June 2016, less than four months after his appointment to cabinet, Adam Brooks (Minister for Mining, Racing, and Building and Construction) was suspended from Cabinet after misleading a budget estimates committee over his use of a company email account belonging to a mining consultancy he owned. On 13 June, Brooks resigned from Cabinet. His former portfolios were assigned to Jeremy Rockliff (Racing), Peter Gutwein (Building and Construction) and Rene Hidding (Mining) on a provisionary basis, before a reshuffle on 18 July that coincided with the appointment of Guy Barnett.

Office	Minister
Premier; Minister for Tourism, Hospitality and Events; Minister for Sport and Recreation; Minister for Aboriginal Affairs	Will Hodgman, MP
Deputy Premier; Minister for Education and Training; Minister for Primary Industries and Water; Minister for Racing	Jeremy Rockliff, MP
Minister for Health; Minister for Information Technology and Innovation; Leader of Government Business, House of Assembly	Michael Ferguson, MP
Attorney-General; Minister for Justice; Minister for Corrections; Minister for the Arts; Leader for the Government, Legislative Council	Vanessa Goodwin, MLC
Minister for State Growth; Minister for Energy; Minister for Environment, Parks and Heritage	Matthew Groom, MP
Treasurer; Minister for Planning and Local Government	Peter Gutwein, MP
Minister for Police and Emergency Management; Minister for Infrastructure	Rene Hidding, MP
Minister for Human Services; Minister for Women	Jacquie Petrusma, MP
Minister for Resources; Minister for Building and Construction	Guy Barnett, MP

== Fourth formation ==
On 28 September 2017, Hodgman announced a reshuffle due to the resignation of Vanessa Goodwin from the cabinet and the Legislative Council, and Matthew Groom moving to the backbench. Elise Archer resigned as Speaker of the House of Assembly and was appointed to the cabinet.

Office	Minister
Premier; Attorney-General; Minister for Aboriginal Affairs; Minister for Heritage; Minister for Tourism, Hospitality and Events; Minister for Sport and Recreation	Will Hodgman, MP
Deputy Premier; Minister for Education and Training; Minister for Primary Industries and Water; Minister for Racing	Jeremy Rockliff, MP
Minister for the Arts; Minister for Corrections; Minister for Environment and Parks; Minister for Justice	Elise Archer, MP
Minister for Building and Construction; Minister for Energy; Minister for Resources	Guy Barnett, MP
Minister for Health; Minister for Information Technology and Innovation; Leader of Government Business, House of Assembly	Michael Ferguson, MP
Treasurer; Minister for Planning and Local Government; Minister for State Growth	Peter Gutwein, MP
Minister for Police and Emergency Management; Minister for Infrastructure	Rene Hidding, MP
Minister for Human Services; Minister for Women	Jacquie Petrusma, MP

Parliament of Tasmania
Preceded by Giddings Ministry	Cabinet of Tasmania; 2014–2018	Succeeded by Second Hodgman Ministry
