= Scott Bacon =

Australian politician

The Honourable Scott Bacon

Member of the Tasmanian House of Assembly for Clark
- In office 28 September 2018 – 22 August 2019
- Succeeded by: Madeleine Ogilvie

Member of the Tasmanian House of Assembly for Denison
- In office 20 March 2010 – 28 September 2018

Personal details
- Born: 27 August 1977 (age 49) Perth, Western Australia
- Party: Labor Party
- Domestic partner: Chantel Crossman
- Children: 2
- Parent: Jim Bacon (father)
- Education: Cosgrove High School; Elizabeth College
- Alma mater: University of Tasmania
- Website: http://scottbacon.com

Scott Bacon (born 27 August 1977) is a former Australian politician. Bacon represented the electorates of Denison and then Clark (after renaming) in the Tasmanian House of Assembly from 2010 to 2019 as a member of the Labor Party.

== Career ==
He was educated at Cosgrove High School, Elizabeth College and the University of Tasmania, where he studied economics. He is the son of former Premier of Tasmania Jim Bacon.

Bacon was elected at the 2010 Tasmanian state election, securing 10.3% of first preferences. The Labor ticket for Denison included three sitting Labor MPs (including the Premier, David Bartlett) but only Bartlett and Bacon were elected, with two sitting members Lisa Singh and Graeme Sturges losing their seats.

In May 2011, Bacon was made a member of Cabinet following Bartlett's resignation, holding the portfolios of Tourism, Hospitality and Veteran's Affairs.

After the Giddings government was defeated in 2014 state election, Bacon was given the role of Shadow Treasurer by new Opposition Leader Bryan Green.

Bacon announced his resignation in August 2019.

== See also ==
- Political families of Australia

Tasmanian House of Assembly
Division created	Member for Clark; 2018–2019; Served alongside: Elise Archer; Ella Haddad; Sue Hickey; Cassy O'Connor	Succeeded by Madeleine Ogilvie
Preceded by David Bartlett; Michael Hodgman; Cassy O'Connor; Lisa Singh; Graeme Sturges	Member for Denison; 2010–2018; Served alongside: Elise Archer; David Bartlett; Matthew Groom; Cassy O'Connor	Division abolished
Political offices
Preceded by Michelle O'Byrne	Minister for Tourism; 2011–2014	Succeeded by Will Hodgman
Preceded by Brian Wightman	Minister for Hospitality; 2011–2014	Succeeded by Will Hodgman
Preceded by Bryan Green	Minister for Veterans' Affairs; 2011–2014	Ministry abolished
New ministry	Minister for Finance; 2014	Ministry abolished
