= Second Hodgman ministry =

Tasmanian parliamentary ministry

The Second Hodgman Ministry was a ministry of the Government of Tasmania, led by Will Hodgman of the Tasmanian Liberals. It was formed on 21 March 2018, after the previous government was re-elected at the 2018 Tasmanian state election.

All members of the ministry, aside from Courtney and Jaensch, previously served in the First Hodgman Ministry.

Portfolio	Minister	Party affiliation	Term start	Term end	Term in office	Image
Premier; Minister for Tourism, Hospitality and Events; Minister for Parks; Minister for Heritage; Minister for Trade	Will Hodgman MP	Liberal	21 March 2018	20 January 2020	670 days	
Deputy Premier; Minister for Education and Training; Minister for Infrastructure; Minister for Advanced Manufacturing and Defence Industries	Jeremy Rockliff MP	Liberal	21 March 2018	20 January 2020	670 days	
Treasurer; Minister for State Growth; Minister for Local Government	Peter Gutwein MP	Liberal	21 March 2018	20 January 2020	670 days	
Minister for Health; Minister for Police, Fire and Emergency Management; Minister for Science and Technology	Michael Ferguson MP	Liberal	21 March 2018	20 January 2020	670 days	
Attorney-General; Minister for Justice; Minister for Corrections; Minister for Environment; Minister for Arts	Elise Archer MP	Liberal	21 March 2018	20 January 2020	670 days	
Minister for Disability Services and Community Development; Minister for Aboriginal Affairs; Minister for Women; Minister for Sport and Recreation	Jacquie Petrusma MP	Liberal	21 March 2018	20 January 2020	670 days	
Minister for Resources; Minister for Energy; Minister for Building and Construction; Minister for Veterans' Affairs	Guy Barnett MP	Liberal	21 March 2018	20 January 2020	670 days	
Minister for Primary Industries and Water; Minister for Racing	Sarah Courtney MP	Liberal	21 March 2018	20 January 2020	670 days	
Minister for Human Services; Minister for Housing; Minister for Planning	Roger Jaensch MP	Liberal	21 March 2018	20 January 2020	670 days	

Parliament of Tasmania
Preceded by First Hodgman Ministry	Cabinet of Tasmania; 2018–2020	Succeeded by First Gutwein Ministry
