= Giddings ministry =

Tasmanian parliamentary ministry

The Giddings Ministry was a Cabinet of Tasmania, and was formed on 24 January 2011. Until 17 January 2014, the Cabinet contained two members of the Tasmanian Greens (highlighted in green) the remainder being from the Labor Party (highlighted in grey). On 31 March 2014, the ministry was succeeded by the Hodgman Ministry after the Labor Party's defeat at the 2014 state election

== First Giddings Ministry ==
Office	Minister
Premier; Treasurer; Minister for the Arts	Lara Giddings, MP
Deputy Premier; Minister for Primary Industries and Water; Minister for Energy and Resources; Minister for Local Government; Minister for Planning; Minister for Racing; Minister for Veteran's Affairs	Bryan Green, MP
Attorney-General; Minister for Justice	David Bartlett, MP
Minister for Corrections and Consumer Protection; Minister for Climate Change; Minister for Sustainable Transport and Alternative Energy; Minister for Aboriginal Affairs	Nick McKim, MP
Minister for Infrastructure; Minister for Economic Development; Minister for Workplace Relations; Minister for Innovation, Science and Technology	David O'Byrne, MP
Minister for Health; Minister for Tourism	Michelle O'Byrne, MP
Minister for Human Services; Minister for Community Development; Secretary to Cabinet	Cassy O'Connor, MP
Minister for Education and Skills; Minister for Children; Minister for Police and Emergency Management	Lin Thorp, MLC
Minister for Environment, Parks and Heritage; Minister for Sport and Recreation; Minister for Hospitality	Brian Wightman, MP
Leader of Government Business in the Legislative Council	Doug Parkinson, MLC

== Second Giddings Ministry ==
The first reshuffle of the Cabinet took place on 13 May 2011, prompted by the resignation from Cabinet of the former Premier David Bartlett, and the defeat of Lin Thorp in the Legislative Council election.

Office	Minister
Premier; Treasurer; Minister for the Arts	Lara Giddings, MP
Deputy Premier; Minister for Primary Industries and Water; Minister for Energy and Resources; Minister for Local Government; Minister for Planning; Minister for Racing	Bryan Green, MP
Minister for Tourism; Minister for Hospitality; Minister for Veterans' Affairs	Scott Bacon, MP
Minister for Education and Skills; Minister for Corrections and Consumer Protection; Minister for Sustainable Transport and Alternative Energy	Nick McKim, MP
Minister for Infrastructure; Minister for Economic Development; Minister for Science, Innovation and Technology; Minister for Police and Emergency Management; Minister for Workplace Relations	David O'Byrne, MP
Minister for Health; Minister for Children; Minister for Sport and Recreation; Leader of Government Business	Michelle O'Byrne, MP
Minister for Human Services; Minister for Community Development; Minister for Climate Change; Minister for Aboriginal Affairs	Cassy O'Connor, MP
Attorney-General; Minister for Justice; Minister for Environment, Parks and Heritage	Brian Wightman, MP
Leader of Government Business in the Legislative Council	Craig Farrell, MLC

== Third Giddings Ministry ==
On 16 January 2014, Premier Lara Giddings announced that the power sharing arrangement with the Tasmanian Greens was over, and that ministers Nick McKim and Cassy O'Connor would be replaced by Labor MPs, effective 17 January. She said that the ALP would not govern with Greens in the cabinet in future.

Office	Minister
Premier; Treasurer; Minister for the Arts; Minister for Community Development; Minister for Climate Change; Minister for Aboriginal Affairs	Lara Giddings, MP
Deputy Premier; Minister for Primary Industries and Water; Minister for Energy and Resources; Minister for Local Government; Minister for Planning; Minister for Racing	Bryan Green, MP
Minister for Tourism; Minister for Hospitality; Minister for Veterans' Affairs; Minister for Finance	Scott Bacon, MP
Minister for Economic Development; Minister for Infrastructure; Minister for Science, Innovation and Technology; Minister for Police and Emergency Management; Minister for Workplace Relations	David O'Byrne, MP
Minister for Health; Minister for Children; Minister for Sport and Recreation; Leader of Government Business	Michelle O'Byrne, MP
Minister for Human Services	Rebecca White, MP
Attorney-General; Minister for Justice; Minister for Environment, Parks and Heritage; Minister for Education and Skills	Brian Wightman, MP
Leader of Government Business in the Legislative Council; Minister for Corrections and Consumer Protection; Minister for Sustainable Transport	Craig Farrell, MLC

Parliament of Tasmania
Preceded by Bartlett Ministry	Cabinet of Tasmania; 2011–2014	Succeeded by First Hodgman Ministry
