= Guy Barnett =

Guy Barnett may refer to:

- Guy Barnett (Australian politician) (born 1962), Liberal Party member of the Australian Senate
- Guy Barnett (British politician) (1928–1986), Labour Party Member of Parliament
