= Cassy O'Connor =

Australian politician (born 1967)

The Honourable Cassy O'Connor MLC
- O'Connor in 2026

Leader of the Tasmanian Greens
- In office 12 June 2015 – 13 July 2023
- Preceded by: Kim Booth
- Succeeded by: Rosalie Woodruff

Member of the Tasmanian Legislative Council for Hobart
- Incumbent
- Assumed office 4 May 2024
- Preceded by: Rob Valentine

Member of the Tasmanian House of Assembly for Clark
- In office 21 July 2008 – 13 July 2023
- Preceded by: Peg Putt
- Succeeded by: Vica Bayley

Secretary to Cabinet
- In office 21 April 2010 – 11 November 2010
- Premier: David Bartlett; Lara Giddings

Minister for Human Services
- In office 11 November 2010 – 17 January 2014
- Premier: David Bartlett; Lara Giddings
- Preceded by: Nick McKim
- Succeeded by: Rebecca White

Minister for Community Development
- In office 11 November 2010 – 17 January 2014
- Premier: David Bartlett; Lara Giddings
- Preceded by: Nick McKim
- Succeeded by: Lara Giddings

Minister for Climate Change
- In office 12 May 2011 – 17 January 2014
- Premier: Lara Giddings
- Preceded by: Nick McKim
- Succeeded by: Lara Giddings

Minister for Aboriginal Affairs
- In office 12 May 2011 – 17 January 2014
- Premier: Lara Giddings
- Preceded by: Nick McKim
- Succeeded by: Lara Giddings

Personal details
- Born: 1 April 1967 (age 59) Canberra, Australia
- Party: Greens
- Spouse(s): Stephen Lees (1st); Nick McKim (2nd)

Cassandra Stanwell O'Connor (born 1 April 1967) is an Australian politician, who was a Tasmanian Greens member of the Tasmanian House of Assembly from 2008 to 2023, representing the electorate of Denison which was renamed to Clark in September 2018. Since the 2024 Tasmanian Legislative Council periodic election, she has represented the electorate of Hobart. O'Connor was the first female Greens minister in Australia, serving in the Giddings ministry intermittently from 2011–14. In 2015, she became leader of the Tasmanian Greens following the resignation of Kim Booth.

== Early career ==
She became well known in Tasmania as the face of the "Save Ralphs Bay" campaign. This community campaign began in March 2004, when Sydney-based developer Walker Corporation announced its intention to construct Tasmania's first canal housing estate in the Ralphs Bay Conservation Area east of Hobart. In June 2010 the legal confirmation of the Ralphs Bay Conservation Area as being 171 hectares came into effect, therefore preventing Walker Corporations proposed canal housing estates.

== Political career ==
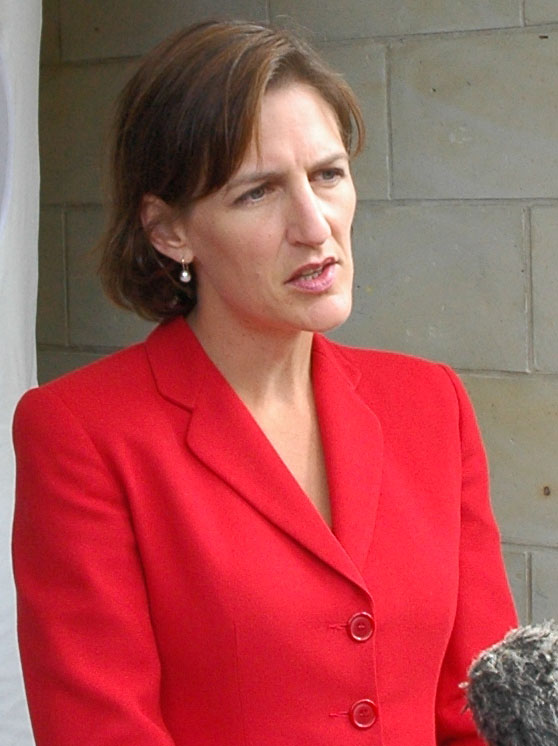
O'Connor addresses media, Hobart, March 2006

O'Connor finished second on the Tasmanian Greens Denison ticket in 2006 with 3.6% of the primary vote. She received 70% of Tasmanian Greens Leader Peg Putt's preferences and eventually reached almost half a quota before being excluded. She first won the seat of Denison on a countback of votes on 21 July 2008 after the sitting member and leader of the Tasmanian Greens Peg Putt resigned earlier in the month.

Cassy O'Connor was re-elected at the 2010 election, receiving the highest number of first preference votes in Denison with 16.2%.

On 19 April 2010, Labor Premier David Bartlett appointed Ms O'Connor as Secretary to Cabinet. In November 2010 she was promoted within the Bartlett cabinet, holding two portfolios. O'Connor and Nick McKim are the first Greens in Australia to hold Cabinet positions.

In 2011 O'Connor was given full Ministerial responsibility for Human Services, Community Development, Aboriginal Affairs and Climate Change. Elements of Community Development include Multicultural Affairs, Seniors, Women, Youth and Gambling. Her colleague Tasmanian Greens Leader Nick McKim MP was Minister for Education, Sustainable Transport, and Corrections and Consumer Affairs.

On 16 January 2014, Premier Lara Giddings announced that the power sharing arrangement with the Tasmanian Greens was over, and that O'Connor and McKim would be replaced by Labor MPs, effective 17 January. She said that the ALP would not govern with Greens in the cabinet in future.

In a speech to parliament in November 2017, O'Connor implied that Greg Geason had been appointed to the Supreme Court of Tasmania because of his friendship with Premier Will Hodgman. Hodgman said that Geason's appointment had been made by an independent selection panel, and the Tasmanian Bar Association issued a statement calling O'Connor's remarks an attack on judicial independence that had "the potential to undermine public confidence in the Supreme Court and the administration of the law in Tasmania".

O'Connor is a critic of Chinese government influence in Australia.

On 13 July 2023, O'Connor announced her resignation as leader of the Tasmanian Greens, and from her seat of Clark in the Tasmanian House of Assembly. O'Connor also confirmed she would be seeking preselection to run for the Greens in 2024 for the division of Hobart, in Tasmania's Legislative Council.

O'Connor was elected to the Tasmanian Legislative Council following the 2024 Tasmanian Legislative Council periodic election. Psephologist Kevin Bonham called her win three hours after the counting had started, due to her maintaining around 40% of the first preference votes, whilst the largest of the other candidates hovered around 18%. O'Connor is the first Tasmanian Greens member of the Tasmanian Legislative Council.

In November 2024, O'Connor stood by claims she had made that president-elect of the United States, Donald Trump, and Prime Minister of India, Narendra Modi were "fascists" and "toxic to life on earth".

== Personal life ==
In July 2009, O'Connor confirmed she was in a relationship with fellow MP and leader of the state Greens party, Nick McKim. She was previously married to Stephen Lees and has four children born prior to the relationship with McKim.

Party political offices
Preceded by Kim Booth	Leader of the Tasmanian Greens; 2015–2023	Succeeded by Rosalie Woodruff
