= Michael Ferguson (Australian politician) =

Australian politician (born 1974)

The Honourable Michael Ferguson MP

21st Deputy Premier of Tasmania
- In office 8 April 2022 – 14 October 2024
- Premier: Jeremy Rockliff
- Preceded by: Jeremy Rockliff
- Succeeded by: Guy Barnett

Member of the Tasmanian House of Assembly for Bass
- Incumbent
- Assumed office 20 March 2010 Serving with 6 others
- Preceded by: Sue Napier

Member of the Australian Parliament for Bass
- In office 9 October 2004 – 24 November 2007
- Preceded by: Michelle O'Byrne
- Succeeded by: Jodie Campbell

Personal details
- Born: 23 March 1974 (age 52) Burnie, Tasmania
- Party: Liberal
- Spouse: Julie
- Children: Eloise, Thomas, James
- Education: University of Tasmania
- Occupation: Politician; Teacher
- Website: http://michaelferguson.com/

Michael Darrel Joseph Ferguson (born 23 March 1974) is an Australian politician who served as the Deputy Premier of Tasmania from April 2022 to October 2024. He has been a Liberal Party member of the Tasmanian House of Assembly in the Division of Bass since the 2010 state election. Ferguson was appointed to cabinet after his party's victory in the 2014 state election and served as Minister in a range of portfolios including: Treasury; Finance; Health; Infrastructure; Transport; State Growth; Police Fire and Emergency Management; and Science and Technology.

Ferguson previously served in federal parliament as a Liberal Party of Australia member in the House of Representatives from 2004 to 2007, representing the federal electorate of Bass. He was defeated at the 2007 federal election which saw the election of the Rudd government (2007–2010).

== Background and early career ==
He was educated at the University of Tasmania, holding degrees in Applied Science and Education. In the past, his broad community activities include many local tourism and progress associations as well as community radio. He has worked as a teacher from 1996 to 2002, and a member of the Meander Valley Council. He has received awards including winning the Regional Initiative category for the Young Australian of the Year Awards for Tasmania in 2002, and Tasmanian Young Achiever of the Year (2002) by the National Australia Day Council.

Before entering politics, he was a teacher in public secondary schools in Northern Tasmania.

== Political career ==
In his parliamentary term in the Commonwealth Parliament Ferguson concentrated on issues such as education, health, family and employment and served on numerous parliamentary and backbench committees. He was the secretary of the Government Education, Science and Training policy committee and is acknowledged as having played a key role in brokering the passage of the Voluntary Student Unionism legislation through the Senate with his (implemented) proposal for a sports infrastructure transition fund.

Soon after the 2007 election when he failed to be elected, Ferguson was appointed as the CEO of the Clifford Craig Medical Research Trust.

He was subsequently elected to the Tasmanian House of Assembly at the 2010 state election, securing the highest number of primary votes in Bass (1.5 quotas) and the second highest vote in the state. In April 2010 Ferguson was appointed as Shadow Minister for Education and Skills; and Shadow Minister for Innovation, Science and Technology.

Ferguson was re-elected at the 2014 state election, at which the Liberals gained government, and was appointed Minister for Health and Minister for Information Technology and Innovation.

As Health Minister, Ferguson led a somewhat contentious reform of the Tasmanian health system by merging the previously three health services into one and changing the services delivered at each of the four hospitals in the state. He has also took charge of the redevelopment of the Royal Hobart Hospital which led to the long-promised buildings eventuated.

One of the highlights of his tenure is the ramping up of health funding and the number of surgeries provided, leading to a historic reduction in the number of people waiting for elective surgery and the introduction of a statewide helicopter network including helipads at each of the state's four major hospitals.

His tenure was not been without incident with his appointment of an interim CEO of the merged health service having a side interest in alternative therapies and a series of electrical and computer failures at the ambulance service. In June 2019 Premier Will Hodgman announced a reshuffle arising from Jacquie Petrusma stepping down from Cabinet for health reasons. Sarah Courtney was appointed to the health portfolio. Ferguson was installed as Minister for Infrastructure and Transport, Minister for State Growth and Minister for Small Business. He continued his existing roles as Minister for Science and Technology and Leader of the House. Premier Will Hodgman praised Ferguson for doing an extraordinary job, saying, "He has without doubt been one of the state's greatest health ministers, he has done an outstanding job.

In January 2020, Premier Will Hodgman resigned and Ferguson was a candidate to succeed him as Premier and Liberal leader but ultimately withdrew from the leadership contest. Treasurer Peter Gutwein was instead elected unopposed as Hodgman's successor. There was speculation that Ferguson would succeed Gutwein as Treasurer but in the end Premier Gutwein chose to retain the Treasury portfolio, appointing Ferguson as Minister for Finance.

On 8 April 2022, after Gutwein resigned as Premier, deputy party leader Jeremy Rockliff became party leader, and Ferguson was elected as deputy party leader to replace Rockliff. Ferguson was sworn in as Deputy Premier of Tasmania that afternoon. Ferguson was also sworn in as Treasurer.

=== Resignation as minister ===
Significant problems with the construction of two new 'Spirit of Tasmania' ferries, including Ukraine-related production delays, cost blow-outs, ongoing arguments with the ferry management board and the port authority, plus bungled tender procurement and design of the berth by the state-owned TT-Line Company to accommodate the new ferries resulted in his resignation as Minister for Infrastructure. He continued to hold the position of Deputy Premier and State Treasurer. Anticipating a successful no confidence motion in the Tasmanian Parliament the following day, Ferguson resigned from the Cabinet on 14 October 2024, but remained Liberal Member for Bass.

Ferguson was re-elected at the 2025 election for the sixth consecutive term.

== Political views ==
Ferguson has been described as a "conservative" Liberal, and opposed same-sex marriage and abortion. In 2018, he criticised the Tasmanian Greens and the Labor Party for their reforms to make birth certificates gender-optional.

Ferguson opposed the 2023 Voice to Parliament.

Ferguson has championed the introduction of a mandatory pre-commitment system for Electronic Gaming Machines, including issuing a Ministerial Direction to the Tasmanian Liquor and Gaming Commission whilst Treasurer. However, implementation of that system was delayed after his departure from Cabinet.

Ferguson has a history of opposing tax hikes. As treasurer in 2022, He presented a budget that included land-tax relief, and doubled the tax-free threshold from $50,000 to $100,000. In 2024, Ferguson rejected Saul Eslake's proposed revenue-raising measures, stating that higher taxation could place added pressure on households and small business. Doubling down, he refused to alter his view after pressure during the Tasmanian budget debates to increase taxes and add additional taxes to stimulate additional revenue.

In 2026, Ferguson opposed the Tasmanian Greens' proposed bill to prohibit conversion practices, arguing that the definition was too vague to implement without infringing on freedom of speech.

Parliament of Australia
Preceded by Michelle O'Byrne	Member for Bass; 2004–2007	Succeeded by Jodie Campbell
Political offices
Preceded by Jeremy Rockliff	Deputy Premier of Tasmania; 2022–2024	Succeeded by Guy Barnett
