= Elise Archer =

Australian lawyer and politician

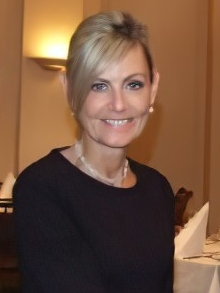
- Archer in 2016

Member of the Tasmanian Parliament for Clark
- In office 20 March 2010 – 4 October 2023
- Succeeded by: Simon Behrakis

63rd Attorney-General of Tasmania
- In office 21 March 2018 – 28 September 2023
- Premier: Will Hodgman; Peter Gutwein; Jeremy Rockliff
- Preceded by: Will Hodgman
- Succeeded by: Guy Barnett

Minister for Justice
- In office 2 October 2017 – 28 September 2023
- Premier: Will Hodgman; Peter Gutwein; Jeremy Rockliff
- Preceded by: Vanessa Goodwin
- Succeeded by: Guy Barnett

Minister for Corrections
- In office 2 October 2017 – 28 September 2023
- Premier: Will Hodgman; Peter Gutwein; Jeremy Rockliff
- Preceded by: Vanessa Goodwin
- Succeeded by: Madeleine Ogilvie

Minister for Environment and Parks
- In office 2 October 2017 – 28 September 2023
- Premier: Will Hodgman; Peter Gutwein; Jeremy Rockliff
- Preceded by: Matthew Groom
- Succeeded by: Roger Jaensch (Environment and Climate Change); Nick Duigan (Parks)

Minister for the Arts
- In office 2 October 2017 – 28 September 2023
- Premier: Will Hodgman; Peter Gutwein; Jeremy Rockliff
- Preceded by: Vanessa Goodwin
- Succeeded by: Madeleine Ogilvie

32nd Speaker of the Tasmanian House of Assembly
- In office 31 March 2014 – 2 October 2017
- Preceded by: Michael Polley
- Succeeded by: Mark Shelton

Alderwoman for Hobart City Council
- In office October 2007 – April 2010

Personal details
- Born: Elise Nicole Nylander; 25 March 1971 (age 55) Launceston, Tasmania, Australia
- Party: Independent (since 2023)
- Other political affiliations: Liberal (until 2023)
- Spouse: Dale Archer
- Education: University of Tasmania (LLB)
- Profession: Lawyer
- Website: www.elisearcher.com.au

Elise Nicole Archer (née Nylander; born 25 March 1971) is an Australian lawyer and politician. She is of Swedish descent.

She was a Hobart city alderman between 2007 and 2010. She unsuccessfully stood as a Liberal Party candidate in the Division of Denison for the 2006 state election. She polled 3.2% of the primary vote, fourth on the Liberal ticket. She stood for the same seat at the 2010 state election, polling 4.2% of the primary vote and narrowly secured the Liberal Party's second seat in Denison from preferences. After being re-elected at the 2014 state election, she was elected Speaker of the Tasmanian House of Assembly.

On 2 October 2017, Archer resigned as Speaker and was sworn in as Minister for Justice, Corrections, Environment and Parks and the Arts.

On 28 September 2023, Archer resigned from her cabinet positions and the Liberal Party in the wake of bullying allegations.

On 4 October 2023, Archer resigned from the Tasmanian House of Assembly.

Parliament of Tasmania
Preceded by Michael Polley	Speaker of the Tasmanian House of Assembly; 2014–2017	Succeeded by Mark Shelton
