= Matthew Groom =

Australian lawyer and politician

The Honourable Matthew Groom

Member of the Tasmanian Parliament for Denison
- In office 20 March 2010 – 3 March 2018

Personal details
- Born: 24 November 1970 (age 55) Melbourne, Victoria, Australia
- Party: Liberal Party
- Parent: Ray Groom
- Education: University of Melbourne; University of Tasmania
- Profession: Lawyer
- Website: http://www.matthewgroom.com.au/

Matthew Guy Groom (born 24 November 1970) is an Australian lawyer and former politician. He was a Liberal Party member for Denison in the Tasmanian House of Assembly from 2010 to 2018. He served as Minister for State Growth, Energy, Environment, Parks and Heritage. Groom also acted as Attorney-General and Minister for Justice during the extended illness of the late Vanessa Goodwin. In September 2017, Groom announced his retirement from politics, giving as a reason the negative impact politics has had on his family life. In August 2018 he was appointed to the Administrative Appeals Tribunal.

Groom was the highest polling candidate for the Liberal Party in Denison at the 2010 Tasmanian state election, securing 13.4% of the primary vote on his own.

Prior to politics, Groom worked as Legal Counsel at Hydro Tasmania and then as General Counsel with the Tasmanian renewable energy company Roaring 40s. He had earlier worked as a mergers and acquisitions lawyer with top-tier Australian law firms Freehills and Minter Ellison both in Melbourne and London.

He holds Bachelor of Laws and Bachelor of Arts degrees from the University of Tasmania and a Master of Laws degree from the University of Melbourne.

He is married to Ruth (Kile) and has two daughters, Chloe and Meg, and a son, Joshua. He is the son of former Premier of Tasmania Ray Groom.
