= Nick McKim =

Australian politician (born 1965)

Senator Nick McKim
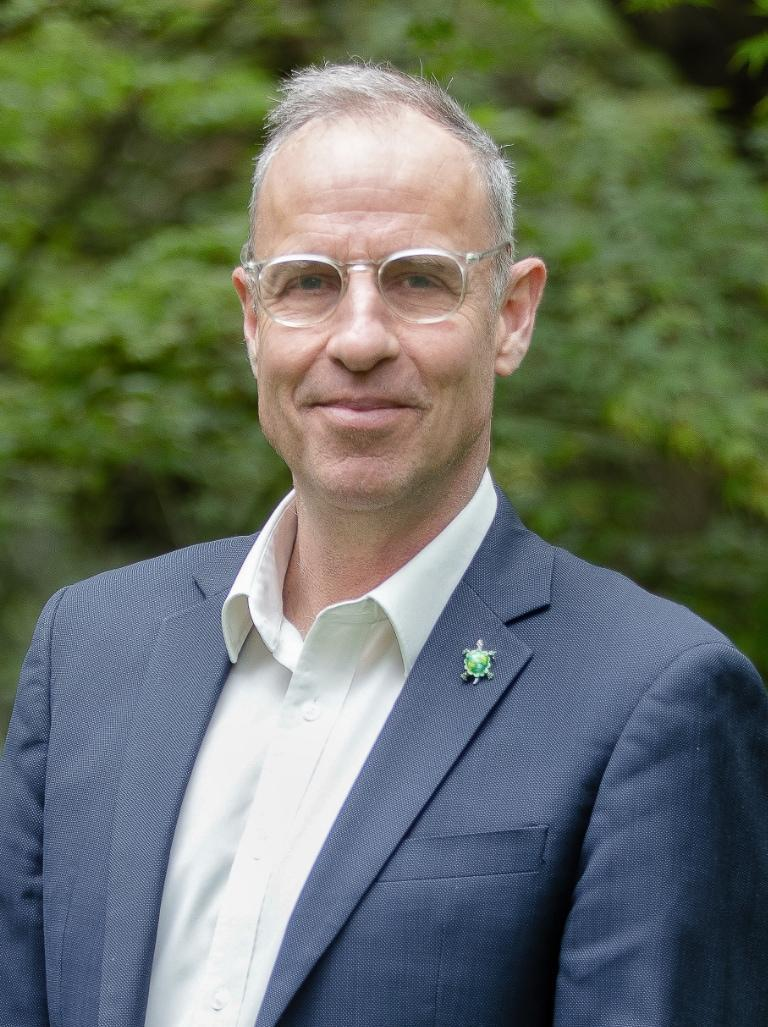

Senator for Tasmania
- Incumbent
- Assumed office 19 August 2015
- Preceded by: Christine Milne

Australian Greens Party Whip
- Incumbent
- Assumed office September 2021
- Leader: Adam Bandt; Larissa Waters; David Shoebridge
- Preceded by: Rachel Siewert

Acting Leader of the Australian Greens
- In office 8 May 2025 – 15 May 2025
- Deputy: Mehreen Faruqi
- Preceded by: Adam Bandt
- Succeeded by: Larissa Waters

Co-Deputy Leader of the Australian Greens
- In office 4 February 2020 – 10 June 2022 Serving with Larissa Waters
- Leader: Adam Bandt
- Preceded by: Adam Bandt
- Succeeded by: Mehreen Faruqi

Member of the Tasmanian Parliament for Franklin
- In office 20 July 2002 – 4 August 2015
- Succeeded by: Rosalie Woodruff

Leader of the Greens in Tasmania
- In office 7 July 2008 – 7 April 2014
- Deputy: Tim Morris
- Preceded by: Peg Putt
- Succeeded by: Kim Booth
State Ministerial roles
Minister for Human Services
In office 21 April 2010 – 11 November 2010
| Preceded by | Lin Thorp |
| Succeeded by | Cassy O'Connor |
Minister for Community Development
In office 21 April 2010 – 11 November 2010
| Preceded by | New office |
| Succeeded by | Cassy O'Connor |
Minister for Sustainable Transport and Alternative Energy
In office 21 April 2010 – 31 May 2011
| Preceded by | New office |
| Succeeded by | Office abolished (Note: Alternative Energy subsumed back into Energy portfolio) |
Minister for Corrections and Consumer Protection
In office 21 April 2010 – 17 January 2014
| Preceded by | Lisa Singh |
| Succeeded by | Craig Farrell |
Minister for Climate Change
In office 21 April 2010 – 13 May 2011
| Preceded by | New office |
| Succeeded by | Cassy O'Connor |
Minister for Aboriginal Affairs
In office 6 December 2010 – 13 May 2011
| Succeeded by | Cassy O'Connor |
Minister for Education and Skills
In office 13 May 2011 – 17 January 2014
| Preceded by | Lin Thorp |
| Succeeded by | Brian Wightman |
Minister for Sustainable Transport
In office 13 May 2011 – 17 January 2014
| Preceded by | New office |
| Succeeded by | Craig Farrell |

Personal details
- Born: Nicholas James McKim; 11 June 1965 (age 61) Lambeth, London, England, United Kingdom
- Citizenship: Australian; British (1965–2015)
- Party: Greens
- Domestic partner: Cassy O'Connor
- Website: greens.org.au/tas/person/nick-mckim

Nicholas James McKim (born 11 June 1965) is an Australian politician who is currently serving as a senator for Tasmania in the federal parliament. He was previously a Tasmanian Greens member of the Tasmanian House of Assembly elected at the 2002 election, representing the Franklin electorate from 2002 to 2015, and led the party from 2008 until 2014. On 21 April 2010, he became the first member of the Greens in any Australian ministry. From February 2020 until June 2022, he served as co-deputy leader of the Australian Greens.

== Early life ==
McKim was born in London, England. When he was five years old, his family emigrated from the UK to Australia. He attended the Hutchins School, Kingston High School, then Hobart College. He lived in Adelaide, South Australia, before moving to Tasmania. Before entering parliament, McKim worked as a wilderness guide and advertising executive.

McKim served time in prison after being arrested during the Farmhouse Creek Blockade in the early 1980s.

=== Citizenship ===
The issue of Nick McKim's citizenship was raised during the 2017–18 Australian parliamentary eligibility crisis while he was a sitting senator. McKim applied to renounce his UK citizenship by filling out the renunciation form (RN) on 31 July 2015. The form was received by the British Home Office on 14 August 2015, further received for processing on 4 September 2015, and formally registered on 1 February 2016. The Home Office citizenship renunciation guidelines state that a person will cease being a British citizen after the date of registration.

Because McKim's RN form was not registered until 1 February 2016, he maintained dual citizenship while serving as a senator, in breach of the Australian constitution, from 20 August 2015 (when he was sworn in as the retiring Christine Milne's replacement) until 1 February 2016, a period of just over 5 months. Since nominations for the 2016 federal election occurred after McKim's citizenship was formally renounced, he was not in breach of section 44(i) when nominating for that election.

== Political career ==
Elected to Tasmanian House of Assembly in the Division of Franklin at the 2002 election, McKim was re-elected at the 2006 election, receiving 15.93 per cent of first preferences, an increase compared to his previous vote of 12.59%. He replaced Peg Putt as Leader of the Tasmanian Greens when Putt retired from Parliament in 2008.

McKim supported the government in passing the same sex relationships bill (which recognises same sex relationships in Tasmania under common law) and has promoted the Greens' own Same Sex Marriage Bill. During 2008, he campaigned against the use of 1080 poison, forestry practices and the state's anti-terrorism bill.

=== Tasmanian government minister ===
In the 2010 Tasmanian election McKim achieved 24.1% of first preferences in his lower house seat. On 19 April 2010, Labor premier David Bartlett agreed to appoint McKim as a minister along with Cassy O'Connor as cabinet secretary.

As a minister, McKim originally held the portfolios of Sustainable Transport and Alternative Energy, Corrections and Consumer Protection, Climate Change, Human Services, and Community Development: though he delegated responsibility for the portfolios of Human Services and Community Development to fellow Greens MP and then cabinet secretary Cassy O'Connor. After a Cabinet reshuffle in November 2010 the portfolios of human services and community development were formally assumed by newly appointed Greens minister Cassy O'Connor, whilst McKim was sworn in as minister for the newly created Aboriginal Affairs portfolio alongside his other three portfolios. Another Cabinet reshuffle, caused by Lin Thorp losing her seat in the Tasmanian Legislative Council elections and David Bartlett resigning from the assembly, then saw McKim sworn in on 13 May 2011 as Minister for Education and Skills, whilst retaining the three portfolios of corrections, consumer protection and sustainable transport. McKim was responsible for overseeing the closing of the Hayes Prison Farm and the removal of Flex Learning for prisoners as Minister for both portfolio areas of Education and Corrections.

On 16 January 2014, the premier, Lara Giddings, announced that the power sharing arrangement with the Tasmanian Greens was over, and that McKim and O'Connor would be replaced by Labor MPs effective on 17 January. She said that the ALP would not govern with Greens in the cabinet in future.

McKim was re-elected to the House of Assembly at the 2014 Tasmanian state election with 13.4% of the primary vote.

=== Federal politics ===
After Christine Milne's resignation from the senate, McKim was announced to be one of the 10 Greens members vying to replace her. The ballot, open to Greens members, was held in July 2015. McKim won the preselection ballot comfortably, defeating Huon Valley Councillor Rosalie Woodruff, environmental lawyer Vanessa Bleyer and several other more minor candidates.

The Tasmanian Greens announced at a press conference on 30 July 2015 that McKim had won the membership ballot to replace Christine Milne in the Senate. He resigned from the Tasmanian Parliament on 4 August, and a countback was conducted to elect Woodruff as his replacement on 17 August. McKim was appointed to the Senate by a joint sitting of the Tasmanian Parliament on 19 August 2015. Unlike other Greens Senators, Senator McKim has had ministerial experience due to him having been a minister in the previous Tasmanian ALP Government whilst as State Greens leader.

McKim was re-elected to the Senate at the 2019 federal election where he received 12.4% of the state's vote, with a swing of 1.41% in his favour.

McKim served as Greens Co-Deputy Leader from 4 February 2020 to 10 June 2022 and in the following positions: Treasury, Finance & Economic Justice Immigration & Citizenship Digital Rights, I.T. & the National Broadband Network. Senator McKim has served as spokesperson within the Greens for Economic Justice, Treasury, Home Affairs, Immigration, Citizenship and Multicultural Affairs from 17 June 2022 and Whip for the Greens in the Senate from 18 October 2021.

On 5 September 2022, McKim called on the Reserve Bank of Australia to pause interest rate hikes. The following day McKim called on the RBA Governor Philip Lowe to resign, stating that Lowe "has not demonstrated that he understands the impact his actions have had on a small business owner or a casual worker trying to pay the rent".

Following the defeat of party leader Adam Bandt at the 2025 Australian Federal Election, McKim served as acting party leader until the election of Larissa Waters to the leadership.

Nick McKim

Twitch information
- Channel: NickMcKimGaming
- Years active: 2025–present
- Genres: Political commentary; Fortnite gaming
- Followers: 2.6 Thousand
- Last updated: 22 January 2026

== Personal life ==
In July 2009, McKim confirmed he was in a relationship with Cassy O'Connor, also a Tasmanian Greens Member of the House of Assembly.

McKim streams on Twitch with his step-son Jasper, typically playing Fortnite and discussing politics in The Corner of Woke.

McKim supports the Hawthorn Hawks in AFL and Manchester United in the Premier League.
