= David Bartlett =

43rd Premier of Tasmania (born 1968)

The Honourable David Bartlett AO
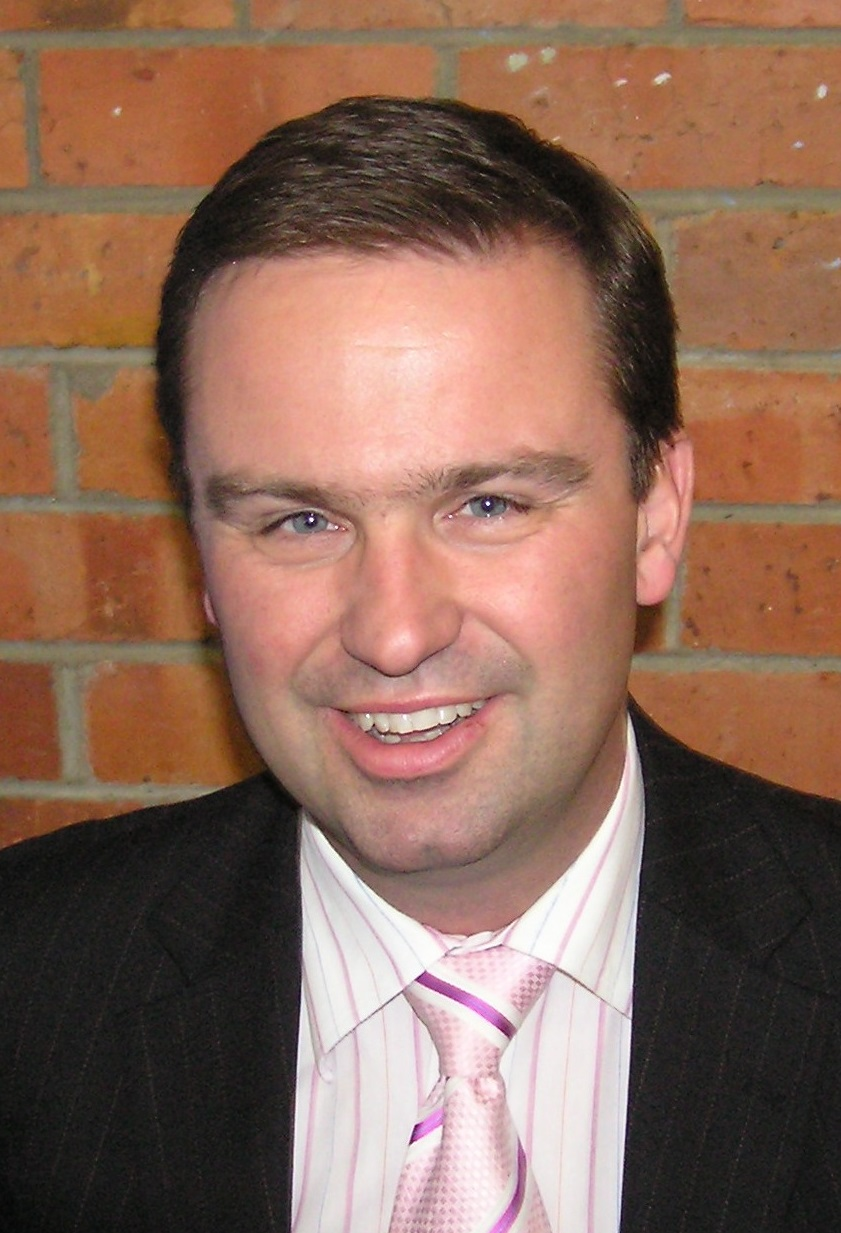
- Bartlett in 2007

43rd Premier of Tasmania
- In office 26 May 2008 – 23 January 2011
- Monarch: Elizabeth II
- Governor: Peter Underwood
- Deputy: Lara Giddings
- Preceded by: Paul Lennon
- Succeeded by: Lara Giddings

Member of the Tasmanian House of Assembly for Denison
- In office 1 April 2004 – 13 May 2011
- Preceded by: Jim Bacon
- Succeeded by: Graeme Sturges

Personal details
- Born: David John Bird; 19 January 1968 (age 58) Hobart, Tasmania, Australia
- Party: Labor Party
- Spouse: Larissa Bartlett (née Marris)
- Children: Hudson and Matilda Bartlett
- Education: University of Tasmania
- Profession: Public servant
- Cabinet: Bartlett ministry
- Website: www.davidbartlett.com.au

David John Bartlett (born 19 January 1968) is an Australian former politician who served as the 43rd Premier of Tasmania from May 2008 until January 2011. He was a Labor Party member of the Tasmanian House of Assembly seat of Denison from 2004 to 2011 when he retired. He was appointed an Officer of the Order of Australia in 2026.

== Early life ==
Bartlett was born David John Bird to a teenage mother in 1968. He was placed into foster care by his biological grandparents and spent 40 days in the hospital before being placed with the Bartlett family. He was never legally adopted by the family however, officially remaining a ward of the state until he was 18. This was likely due to ensure continued financial assistance needed to address medical needs during Bartlett's infancy.

Bartlett was raised Baptist.

He has been a resident of both Moonah and Mount Nelson. His education started at Mount Nelson Primary School, with secondary education at Taroona High School and Hobart College. He completed a Bachelor of Science in Computer Science and a Graduate Diploma of Business in Professional Management at the University of Tasmania.

Prior to entering parliament, he had a career in the information technology industry and the public sector, and served as the Manager of the Tasmanian Innovation Centre and as an advisor to former Tasmanian treasurer, David Crean.

== Parliament ==
He first entered parliament on a countback in 2004 after then Premier Jim Bacon resigned due to cancer. Bartlett was Deputy Premier of Tasmania from April to May 2008 and Premier of Tasmania from 26 May 2008, succeeding Paul Lennon.

Bartlett was re-elected in the 2006 election, receiving 12.97% of first preferences and topping the Labor vote in Denison; he was appointed Minister for Education and Skills in the Lennon Cabinet. As part of his parliamentary duties he served on the Public Accounts Committee, the Environment, Resources and Development Committee and the Library Committee of Parliament.

On 10 April 2008 Paul Lennon announced Bartlett as the new Deputy Premier, replacing Steve Kons.

=== Premier ===
On 26 May 2008 Lennon made the surprise announcement that he would resign that day as Premier. Bartlett was sworn in as Premier later in the day by the Tasmanian Governor, the Hon. Peter Underwood, having been elected State party leader by the caucus.

During the March 2010 election campaign, Bartlett promised to resign as Premier if the opposition Liberal Party won more seats than the government, and that a "back room deal with the Greens is a deal with the devil... I am not going to sell my soul for the sake of remaining in power".

The seat results were 10 Liberal (38.99%), 10 Labor (36.88%), and 5 Green (21.61%), a hung parliament. With neither major party having a majority and neither willing to negotiate with the Greens, Bartlett and Labor voted to relinquish power to the Liberals since they had won the popular vote. Bartlett then went to Government House with a letter urging the Governor, Peter Underwood, to commission a Liberal minority government. However, Underwood opted to recommission Bartlett, taking the line that the Liberals were not in a position to provide stable government. Underwood noted that Hodgman had not approached the Greens for support before the writs were returned, and Bartlett had not promised a minimum period of support to a Hodgman minority government. He also concluded that Bartlett's promise to give up power was not relevant, since the decision to invite a person to form government was solely within the governor's prerogative. Since Bartlett still held his commission as Premier, Underwood was of the view that Bartlett was obliged to test the support for his government on the floor of the House of Assembly. This was per longstanding Westminster convention that the incumbent premier/prime minister has the first opportunity to form a government if no party has a majority.

Greens leader Nick McKim announced his party's support for Labor on matters of confidence and supply. A Labor-Green agreement with joint ministry arrangements eventuated, leading the Governor to re-appoint Bartlett as Premier in a Labor minority government. Bartlett said his minority government with the Greens was his biggest challenge of 2010: "I think the alternative would have been political chaos and parliamentary chaos, and that would be good for no-one. It had better work because with Tasmania facing hung parliaments and minority governments for the next decade or two as a regular part of our political landscape, we must find ways to make this work."

Bartlett government achievements include the establishment of an integrity commission and introduction of freedom of information legislation, successfully lobbying for Tasmania being the first to receive the National Broadband Network rollout, and advocacy of Tasmania being the "national food bowl". However, education system reforms and forestry issues have been controversial for the government.

=== Resignation ===
Bartlett announced his resignation as Premier of Tasmania and Tasmanian Labor leader on Facebook on 23 January 2011, citing family reasons. Deputy Premier Lara Giddings was sworn in on 24 January as the new Premier. In the Giddings cabinet, Bartlett was appointed as Attorney-General and Justice Minister. He said he would remain in parliament but did not intend to contest the next election. On 11 May 2011, following the defeat of Labor's Lin Thorp in Legislative Council elections, he resigned from cabinet but said he would remain in parliament for some "months". On 13 May, following pressure from within Labor and the Opposition, he quit parliament entirely.

== Private life ==
Bartlett is married to Larissa, and has two children, Hudson and Matilda. He served as the president of the Hobart Chargers basketball club between 2016 and 2019.

Political offices
Preceded by Paula Wriedt	Minister for Education (and Skills); 2006–2010	Succeeded by Nick McKim
Preceded by Steve Kons as Minister for Infrastructure, Resources, Planning and Workplace Relations	Minister for Planning and Workplace Relations; 2008	Succeeded by Allison Ritchie as Minister for Workplace Relations
Preceded by Steve Kons as Minister for Infrastructure, Resources, Planning and Workplace Relations	Minister for Planning and Workplace Relations; 2008	Succeeded by David Llewellyn as Minister for Planning
Preceded by Steve Kons	Deputy Premier of Tasmania; 2008	Succeeded by Lara Giddings
Preceded by Paul Lennon	Premier of Tasmania; 2008–2011	Succeeded by Lara Giddings
Preceded by New ministry	Minister for Innovation, Science and Technology; 2010–2011	Succeeded by David O'Byrne
Preceded by Lara Giddings	Attorney-General; Minister for Justice; 2011	Succeeded by Brian Wightman
Party political offices
Preceded by Paul Lennon	Leader of the Labor Party in Tasmania; 2008–2011	Succeeded by Lara Giddings
