= Jeremy Rockliff =

Australian politician (born 1970)

The Honourable Jeremy Rockliff MP
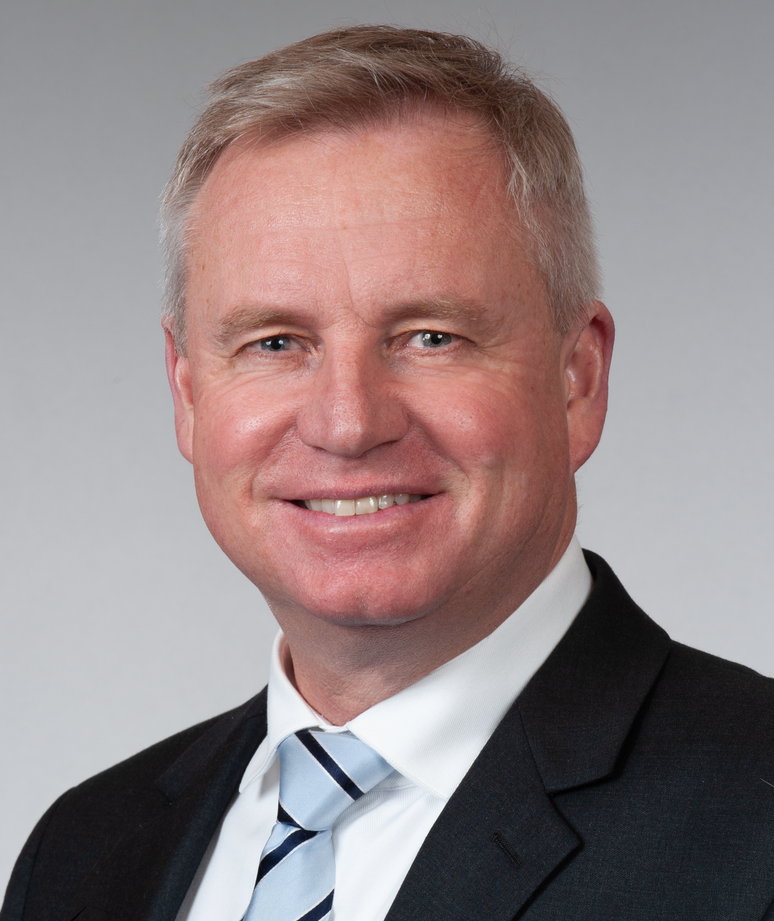
- Official portrait, 2024

47th Premier of Tasmania
- Incumbent
- Assumed office 8 April 2022
- Monarchs: Elizabeth II; Charles III
- Governor: Barbara Baker; Caroline Wells
- Deputy: Michael Ferguson; Guy Barnett
- Preceded by: Peter Gutwein

Deputy Premier of Tasmania
- In office 31 March 2014 – 8 April 2022
- Premier: Will Hodgman; Peter Gutwein
- Preceded by: Bryan Green
- Succeeded by: Michael Ferguson

Deputy Leader of the Tasmanian Liberal Party
- In office 30 March 2006 – 8 April 2022
- Leader: Will Hodgman; Peter Gutwein
- Preceded by: Will Hodgman
- Succeeded by: Michael Ferguson

Member of the Tasmanian House of Assembly for Braddon
- Incumbent
- Assumed office 20 July 2002 Serving with 6 others

Minister for Tourism
- In office 11 April 2024 – 7 August 2025
- Succeeded by: Jane Howlett

Minister for Trade and Major Investment
- In office 11 April 2024 – 7 August 2025
- Succeeded by: Guy Barnett

Personal details
- Born: Jeremy Page Rockliff; 5 February 1970 (age 56) Devonport, Tasmania, Australia
- Party: Liberal
- Spouse: Sandra Knowles
- Children: 3
- Education: Launceston Church Grammar School; Lincoln University
- Occupation: Politician, farmer, company director
- Portfolio: Education and Training; Primary Industries and Water
- Website: www.jeremyrockliff.com.au
- Nickname(s): Rocko; J-Rock

Jeremy Page Rockliff MP (born 5 February 1970) is an Australian politician who has served as the 47th premier of Tasmania and leader of the Tasmanian Liberal Party since 2022. He previously served as deputy premier from 2014 to 2022.

Rockliff was raised in Sassafras, Tasmania, and was a farmer before entering politics. He was first elected to the Tasmanian House of Assembly at the 2002 state election, representing the division of Braddon. He was elected deputy leader of the Liberal Party in 2006 and served as deputy premier from 2014 to 2022 in the governments of Will Hodgman and Peter Gutwein. Rockliff replaced Gutwein as premier in 2022. His party lost its parliamentary majority in 2023. He subsequently called an early election in 2024 and remained as premier in minority government after securing confidence and supply from minor parties and independents.

In 2025, Rockliff called another early election after the House of Assembly passed a no-confidence motion in his government. The Liberal Party increased its primary vote and remained the largest party, with Rockliff forming another minority government after the election with the support of independents. Key issues of his tenure as premier have included the lifting of COVID-19 restrictions, the construction of new Bass Strait ferries, and the Tasmanian AFL bid and Macquarie Point Stadium.

== Early life ==
Rockliff was born on 5 February 1970 in Devonport, Tasmania. He is the son of Richard "Rick" and Geraldine Rockliff, with his father's family having farmed at Sassafras since the 1850s. His father, who died in 2023, farmed potatoes and opium poppies, working for Tasmanian Alkaloids.

Rockliff grew up on his family's farm at Sassafras. In the early 1980s he and his siblings helped his father erect the Big Spud (also known as Kenny the Kennebec), a large pole-mounted sculpture of a potato considered one of Australia's "big things". The family used the sculpture as an advertising gimmick for its roadside potato stall on the Bass Highway.

Rockliff attended Latrobe High School and Launceston Church Grammar School. He completed a diploma in farm management at Lincoln University in New Zealand, before returning to Sassafras to work on the family property. He was president of the Latrobe Football Club from 2006 to 2009.

=== Family History ===
The Rockliff family are widely accepted as the pioneering settlers of the district of Sassafras. They are descendants of four Rockliff brothers from Kirk Smeaton in Yorkshire, England: Henry, George (Jeremy's great-great-grandfather), Francis and John. The brothers were cousins of prominent and influential early settler, Henry Reed of the estates "Mount Pleasant", Launceston and "Wesley Dale", Chudleigh (now located within the township boundaries of Mole Creek). Henry Rockliff was the first of the brothers to arrive in 1840, after Reed requested he come to Van Diemen's Land to manage his Wesley Dale estate. In 1851, Reed leased the property to Henry Rockliff for ten years at £450 per year. His brother, George, was the next brother to come to the colony, joining Henry in 1852 in Chudleigh. John, then Francis, shortly followed. All four brothers spent some years at Wesley Dale.

During the next decade, Henry employed sixty ticket of leave convicts. Indeed, much of the family's success was founded on cheap convict labour, which, when Reed later refused to sell Rockliff the Wesley Dale estate, enabled him to instead purchase "as much land at Sassafras as his means would permit" per his uncle's advice.

Henry first purchased "Skelbrook", an eleven hundred acre virgin forest for two pounds per acre. Under his brother George's management, thirty ticket of leave men were employed to clear this land in order to enable the family to live there. Later, George took over a portion of this land and called it "Springfield". The homestead he built there has been described as "evidence of the ability of the ticket-of-leave men as tradesmen".

Brothers John and Francis eventually also purchased land and built homesteads. Upon the success of his first small farm at East Sassafras, John bought "Westfield". Francis purchased and built "Robin Hood Wells" in 1860. In 1858, George wrote to Ann Levick back in Yorkshire, asking her to join him in Tasmania as his wife. Despite her parents initial disapproval, Ann was determined, and they relented and allowed her to book passage shortly after. George and Ann were married at his brothers property, Robin Hood Wells, on April 2, 1860, by Reverend Edward P. Adams of the Church of England.

The couple had four sons and one daughter. Their youngest son, George Levick Rockliff, married Linda Constance Jessop. Together, they had two sons, one of which was Donald George, who married Enid Mary. Their son, Richard "Rick" George, married Geraldine Page: Jeremy's parents. When the Bass Highway was being built, and then extended in 1978, Jeremy's parents, Richard and Geraldine of Springfield, purchased land that was part of the Robin Hood Wells estate cut off by the Highway on the Southern side.

== Political career ==
=== Early career ===
Rockliff joined the Young Liberal Movement in 1991, and the Liberal Party in 1992. He became MP for Braddon in the House of Assembly in 2002. He was immediately promoted to the front bench, serving as opposition whip from 2002 until March 2006. When Will Hodgman, who had also been first elected in 2002, was elected leader of The Tasmanian Liberal Party in March 2006, he named Rockliff as his deputy, and hence Deputy Leader of the Opposition.

=== Deputy Premier ===
Rockliff became Deputy Premier of Tasmania in March 2014, following the Liberal Party winning government at the 2014 state election. He was also Minister for Education and Training, and Minister for Primary Industries and Water. When Hodgman resigned as party leader and Premier in January 2020, Rockcliff did not stand in the subsequent Liberal Party leadership contest, which was won by Peter Gutwein unopposed on 20 January 2020. As such, Rockliff remained as deputy party leader and Deputy Premier.

Along with being Deputy Premier, Rockliff continued to hold multiple portfolios as the Minister for Education and Training, Minister for Trade, Minister for Advanced Manufacturing and Defence Industries, Minister for Disability Services and Community Development, and Minister for Mental Health and Wellbeing.

=== Premier ===
At a party-room meeting on the morning 8 April 2022, Rockliff was elected unopposed as the new leader of the Tasmanian Liberal Party, after Peter Gutwein had announced his resignation earlier that week. That afternoon he was sworn in by the Governor as the 47th Premier of Tasmania.

As Premier, Rockliff has continued the state government's negotiations with the Australian Football League in an attempt to gain a 19th team licence for Tasmania. Rockliff has championed a proposed $1.3 billion multi-use stadium to be built in Hobart's Macquarie Point as a part of this bid. For his steadfast support of a stadium he has faced criticism from the community and the opposition parties and cross-bench Members of Parliament as well as some in the federal Liberal Party. On 12 May 2023, Lara Alexander, alongside fellow Tasmanian Liberal John Tucker state MP, left the Liberal Party to sit as independent Members of Parliament, in part due to concerns related to the proposed Macquarie Point Stadium project and lack of transparency. This left the Liberal party in minority government and requiring seven seats to reach a majority in the next state election.

On 28 September 2023, attorney general Elise Archer resigned from cabinet after being asked to do so by Rockliff in response to allegations of bullying and subsequent leaks of information from the government against her. In doing so she additionally resigned from the Liberal Party, leaving the government as a minority government with ten seats in the lower house. Archer subsequently resigned from parliament, following a statement from Rockliff that he would call an early election if she did not do so.

On 13 February 2024, Rockliff called a snap election after his demands of a permanent supply and confidence deal were denied by the now independent MPs Alexander and Tucker due to continued disagreements. At the 2024 state election, the first since the expansion of the House of Assembly to 35 seats, the Liberal Party suffered a negative swing of 12 points but still finished with the largest share of the vote. Rockliff was still unable to form a majority government, with the Liberals winning 14 out of 35 seats in an increased overall Parliament. He subsequent reached confidence and supply agreements with three MPs who were then in the Jacqui Lambie Network, and with independent MP David O'Byrne. The second Rockliff ministry was sworn in on 11 April 2024.

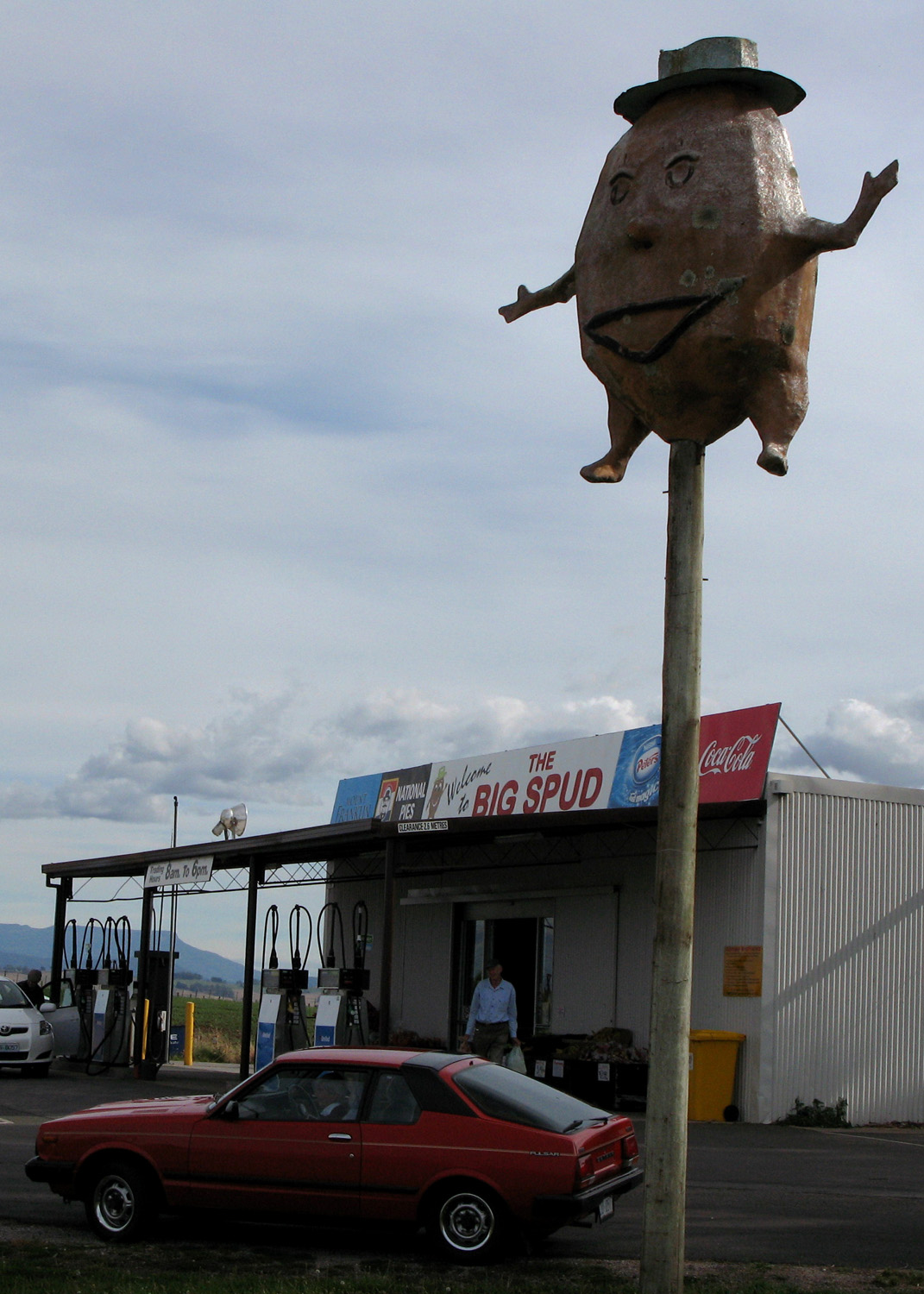
The "Big Spud" in Sassafras, erected by Rockcliff and his father in the 1980s

On 19 November 2024, Rockliff's government survived an impromptu motion of no confidence put forth by the Tasmanian Greens. Rockliff was supported in the motion by the Jacqui Lambie Network, the Tasmanian Labor Party, and all independents excluding Kristie Johnston who voted against Rockliff despite having a confidence-and-supply agreement with him.

On 5 June 2025, the parliament passed a no-confidence motion against him. Rockliff announced he would visit the lieutenant-governor seeking a snap election. The 2025 Tasmanian state election was held on 19 July 2025 with the Liberals holding onto 14 Seats.

A second no-confidence motion was moved in Jeremy Rockliff and his Liberal Government when parliament returned following the 2025 election. The result was 10-24 with only the Labor Party supporting the motion. As Rockliff survived the motion, he was able to form minority government with only 14 seats and no formal confidence and supply agreements in place.

Rockliff is the first Tasmanian Premier to be censured, following a successful motion moved by the Tasmanian Greens on 17 June 2026.

== Political views ==
Rockliff has been described as a moderate Liberal.

Rockliff voted for the End of Life Choices (Voluntary Assisted Dying) Bill in 2021 that legalised voluntary assisted dying in Tasmania after voting against previous similar bills in 2009, 2013 and 2017.

Rockliff supported the Indigenous Voice to Parliament in the lead-up to the 2023 referendum, despite federal Liberal leader Peter Dutton's opposition. He stated that he would campaign "vigorously" for the Voice and joined several other state Liberal leaders in supporting the Voice and opposing Dutton's position. Rockliff has also supported changing the date of Australia Day from 26 January.

Rockliff joined Federal Labor and other state premiers to support the 2025 Adolescent Social Media Ban, although he argued for a minimum age of 14 instead of 16.

Political offices
Preceded by Bryan Green	Deputy Premier of Tasmania; 2014–2022	Succeeded by Michael Ferguson
Preceded by Bryan Green	Minister for Primary Industries and Water; 2014–2022	Succeeded by Jo Palmer
Preceded by Bryan Green	Minister for Racing; 2014–2016	Succeeded by Adam Brooks
Preceded by Brian Wightman as Minister for Education and Skills	Minister for Education and Training; 2014–2022	Succeeded by Roger Jaensch
Preceded by Peter Gutwein	Premier of Tasmania; 2022–present	Incumbent
Party political offices
Preceded by Peter Gutwein	Leader of the Liberal Party in Tasmania; 2022–present	Incumbent
