= Brian Wightman (politician) =

Australian politician

Attorney-General of Tasmania
- In office 13 May 2010 – 31 March 2014
- Preceded by: David Bartlett
- Succeeded by: Vanessa Goodwin

Member of the Tasmanian House of Assembly for Bass
- In office 20 March 2010 – 15 March 2014

Personal details
- Born: 9 January 1976 (age 50) Launceston, Tasmania, Australia
- Party: Labor Party
- Education: University of Tasmania
- Profession: Teacher

Brian Neal Wightman (born 9 January 1976) is an Australian politician who served as Attorney-General of Tasmania from 2010 to 2014.

Wightman is a first-generation Tasmanian of Northern Irish descent. His parents William and Mary migrated from Belfast, Northern Ireland, to Tasmania in 1971. He is married to Katie and they have two children, twins William and Beatrix, who were born on Christmas Eve, 2008.

He was educated in Launceston, Tasmania and attended Trevallyn Primary School and Riverside High School before graduating from Launceston College in 1993. Wightman studied to become a teacher and obtained a Bachelor of Education in 1997 and a Master of Education in 2004, both from the University of Tasmania.

Wightman is the former Principal of Winnaleah District High School and Branxholm Primary School and was a teacher at Port Dalrymple School in George Town for seven years before being elected in the electorate of Bass at the State election in 2010.

Before embarking on his teaching career Wightman followed his father into the factory, working each summer holiday from age 15. His Father is a life-member of the Australian Manufacturing Workers Union and completed 30 years of service at Amcor Fibre Containers.

Wightman's first teaching appointment was to George Town at George Town Primary School in 1998. He also taught at Port Dalrymple School, also in George Town, and was principal of Winnaleah District High School and Branxholm Primary School.

He is a strong supporter of the Labor Federal Government's Gonski reforms to education and is a member of the Australian Education Union.

Wightman was first pre-selected as a Labor candidate for the state seat of Bass in the 2010 state election and secured election as the second Labor MP in a close contest with Scott McLean and Beaconsfield Mine collapse survivor Brant Webb.

At the 2014 state election he held the following ministerial responsibilities; Attorney General, Minister for Justice, Minister for Environment, Parks and Heritage, and Minister for Education and Skills.

Wightman was elected to the Tasmanian House of Assembly in 2010 being the 5th candidate elected for the seat of Bass. Comparing the results between the 2010 and 2014 state elections Wightman managed to increase his 1st preference vote by more than 2000 votes, even though he lost his seat in 2014 the increased personal vote is significant given there was an 11.2% swing against the Labor party in Bass.

After losing his seat at the 2014 Tasmanian State Election Wightman took up the position of Chief Executive of Cornerstone Youth Services which is a Launceston-based community health organisation which delivers services to people aged 12 to 25 in Tasmania's North and North-West. He later took up the position of Tasmanian Executive Director of the Property Council of Australia, commencing this role on 22 September 2014.
