= 2010 Tasmanian state election =

State election in Australia

- 20 March 2010

All 25 seats in the House of Assembly 13 seats needed for a majority
- Opinion polls
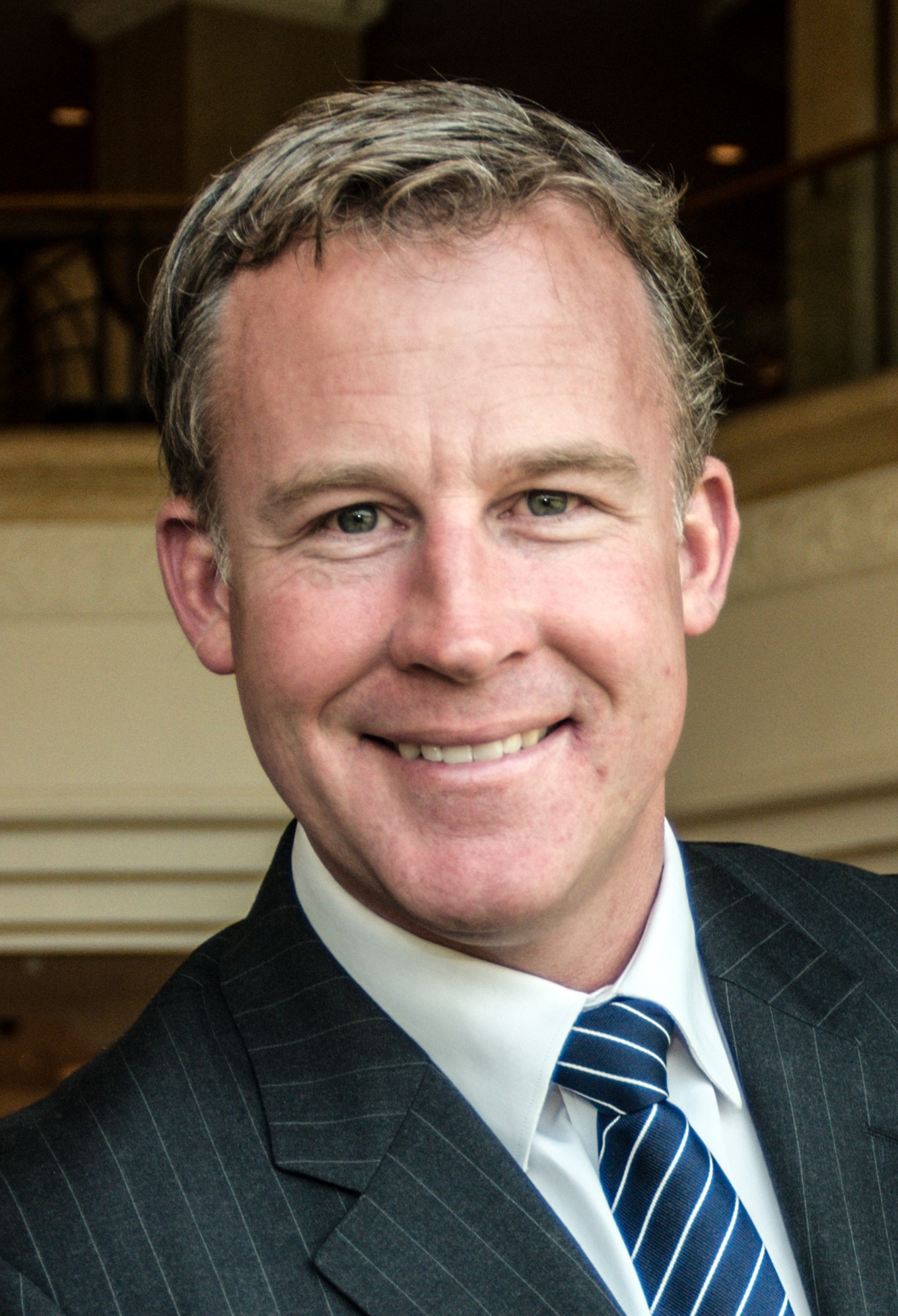

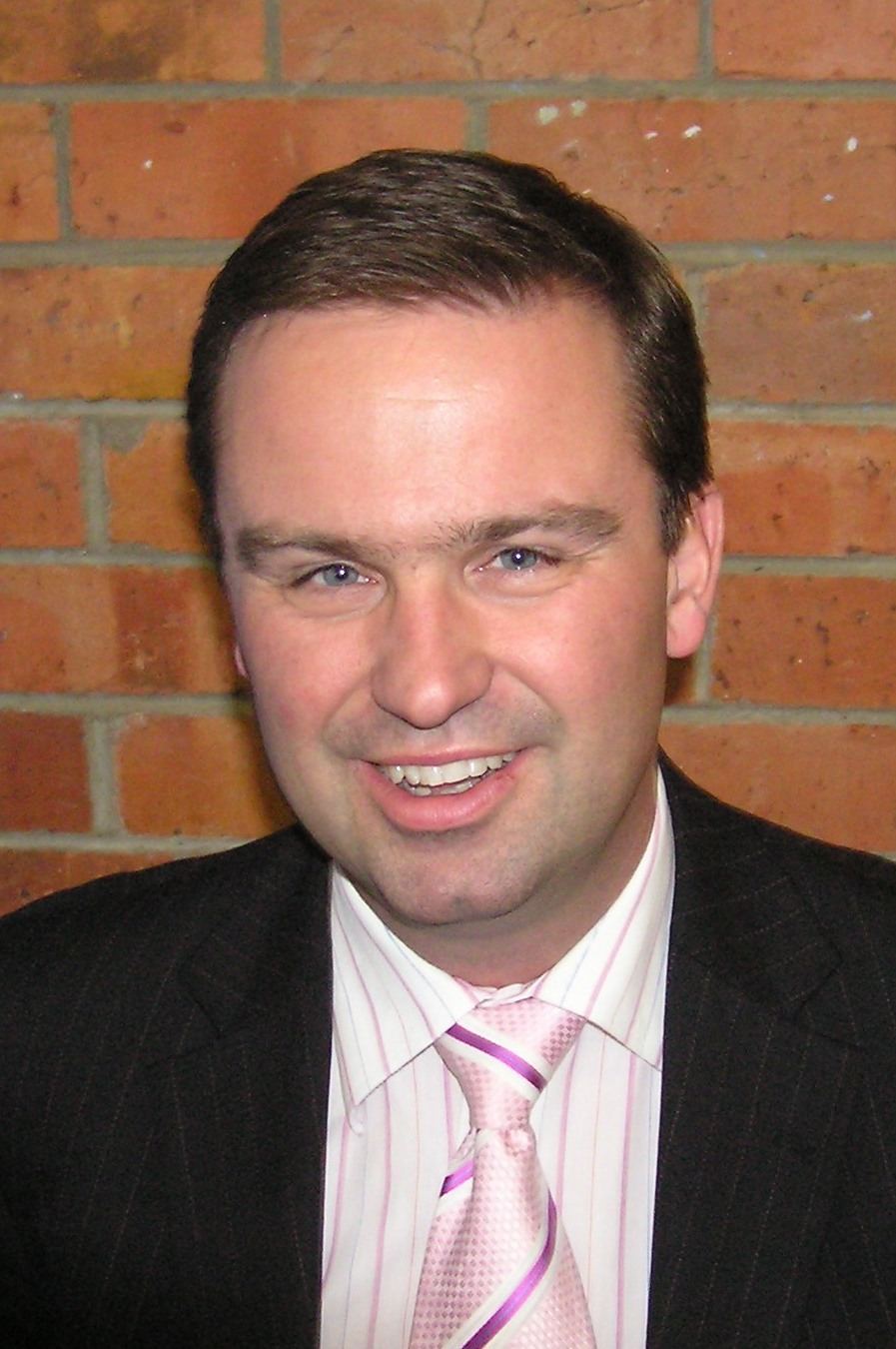

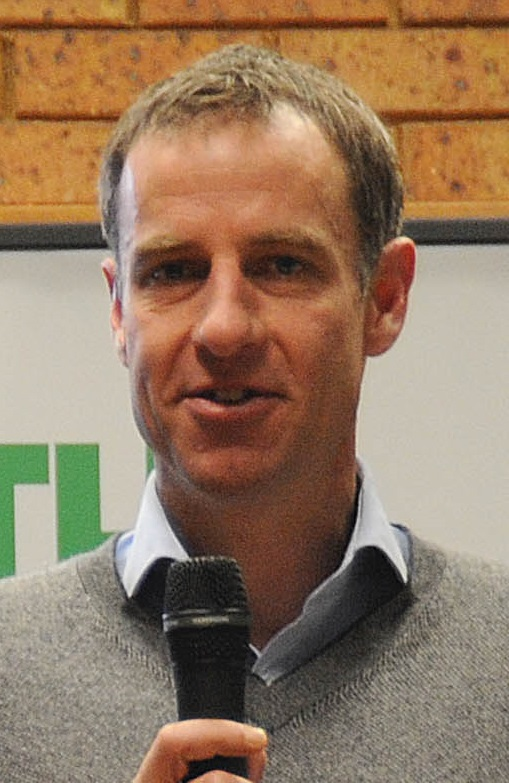
	First party	Second party	Third party
Leader	Will Hodgman	David Bartlett	Nick McKim
Party	Liberal	Labor	Greens
Leader since	30 March 2006	26 May 2008	7 July 2008
Leader's seat	Franklin	Denison	Franklin
Last election	7 seats, 31.82%	14 seats, 49.27%	4 seats, 16.64%
Seats won	10	10	5 seats
Seat change	▲3	▼4	▲1
Popular vote	124,933	118,168	69,233
Percentage	38.99%	36.88%	21.61%
Swing	▲7.17	▼12.39	▲4.97
- Results of the election
Premier before election
David Bartlett
Labor
Subsequent Premier
David Bartlett
Labor

The 2010 Tasmanian state election was held on 20 March 2010 to elect members to the Tasmanian House of Assembly. The 12-year incumbent Labor government, led by Premier of Tasmania David Bartlett, won a fourth consecutive term against the Liberal opposition, led by Will Hodgman, after Labor formed a minority government with the support of the Greens.

The election was conducted by the Tasmanian Electoral Commission, an independent body answerable to Parliament. As in past Tasmanian state elections, the proportional Hare-Clark system was used to allocate the 25 seats in the House. The commission announced that there were 357,315 enrolled electors at the close of rolls. A total of 89 candidates nominated for election.

== Dates ==
On 17 November 2008, David Bartlett announced his government's intention to pass legislation enacting fixed electoral terms for Tasmania, with the next election scheduled to be held on 20 March 2010. It was noted by ABC election analyst Antony Green that the date was the same as the already-legislated South Australian election, and that this may have an effect on media coverage of both elections. The draft legislation for the bill was referred to the Select Committee on the Working Arrangements of Parliament in October 2009, although Bartlett confirmed that the government was committed to the 20 March election date despite the fixed-term legislation not being enacted.

On 12 February 2010, the Premier visited the Governor of Tasmania, Peter Underwood, to request that he dissolve the House of Assembly and issue the writs for the election. The Governor agreed to the following election dates:

- 19 February 2010: Issue of writs and close of electoral rolls
- 4 March 2010: Close of candidate nominations
- 5 March 2010: Announcement of candidate nominations
- 20 March 2010: Polling day

== Campaign ==
On 8 February, the Premier announced that Tasmania's first televised leaders' debate would be held on 14 March between himself and opposition leader Will Hodgman, and would be broadcast nationally by Sky News. At the time of the announcement, Mr Hodgman was not aware of the debate and Greens leader Nick McKim was not invited.

On 10 March, around 100 forest workers protested outside the Greens official campaign launch.

On 12 March, two Liberal and two Labor ex-premiers—Paul Lennon, Michael Field, Robin Gray and Tony Rundle—issued a joint press release warning voters of the dangers of minority government with the Greens holding the balance of power.

In the week before the election, the Labor party distributed leaflets alleging that the Greens had a plan to legalise heroin and give "violent criminals" the right to vote. In addition, 20,000 automated phone calls (robocalls) were made to residents of Braddon repeating these claims about the Greens, although Labor ended the campaign after a public backlash.

On 15 March, David Bartlett said he would resign if the Liberal party won more seats than Labor.

== Results ==
2010 Tasmanian state election: House of Assembly
Party	Votes	%	+/–	Seats	+/–
Liberal	124,933	38.99	▲7.17	10	▲3
Labor	118,168	36.88	▼12.39	10	▼4
Greens	69,233	21.61	▲4.97	5	▲1
Socialist Alliance	646	0.20	▲0.04	0	Steady
Independents	7,458	2.33	▲0.72	0	Steady
Total	320,438	100.00	–	25	–
Valid votes	320,438	95.55			
Invalid/blank votes	14,915	4.45	▲0.01		
Total votes	335,353	100.00	–		
Registered voters/turnout	357,315	93.85	▼1.03		
Source: Tasmanian Electoral Commission

=== Primary vote by division ===
	Bass	Braddon	Denison	Franklin	Lyons
Labor Party	34.52%	40.24%	36.30%	30.49%	42.76%
Liberal Party	42.64%	45.19%	29.79%	41.17%	36.10%
Tasmanian Greens	20.95%	13.76%	24.89%	27.35%	21.14%
Other	1.89%	0.80%	9.01%	0.99%	0.00%

=== Final distribution of seats ===
Electorate	Seats held
Bass	
Braddon	
Denison	
Franklin	
Lyons	

Labor
Liberal
Green

== Outcome ==
Labor lost four seats on a swing of 12.39 percentage points against it, whilst the Liberals gained three seats and the Greens one—the latter recording their highest ever statewide vote of 21.61%. This meant that both the Labor and Liberal Parties had 10 seats each, meaning neither could form majority government. It took over two weeks for the results to be formally declared, although the number of seats for each party was almost certain by the end of counting on the night of the election and the main question was which representatives of each party would win a seat, with the Hare-Clark and Robson rotation systems meaning that some incumbent members on both sides of parliament were defeated by newcomers from their own party. The only inter-party battles for a seat during the counting process were between the Greens and Liberals for the final seat in Braddon (won by the Greens), and between independent Andrew Wilkie and the Liberals for the final seat in Denison (won by the Liberals).

Attention was then focussed on the positions of the parties. Greens leader Nick McKim declared he was willing to make a deal with either party, whilst incumbent Premier David Bartlett and opposition leader Will Hodgman insisted they would stick to promises made before the election not to make any deals. Bartlett had also pledged that whoever won the most seats or, in the event of a tie, the most votes would have the right to form a government. Since the Liberals had won the popular vote by a margin of 6,700 votes, both leaders now claimed this meant that Hodgman had the right to form a ministry. On 1 April, the Labor caucus unanimously agreed to relinquish power and Bartlett announced that he would advise the Governor, Peter Underwood, to give Hodgman the opportunity to form government. Former federal Labor powerbroker Graham Richardson called Bartlett "silly" for not negotiating with the Greens.

On 7 April the results were formally declared. Under the Constitution Act 1934 Underwood had seven days to commission a Government. However, Bartlett neither resigned nor asked the governor to be recommissioned as governor. He instead remained as premier and advised that the governor "invite" Hodgman to indicate if he was willing and able to form a government. Only if Hodgman was able to satisfy the governor that was so able to form the government would Bartlett resign. If not, Bartlett would tender new advice.

The governor then received advice from Hodgman that he was willing and able to form a government, arguing that Bartlett had stated he would not support a no-confidence motion and that hence that Hodgman had the majority support of the lower house. However, the governor then sought reassurances from Bartlett, who denied that he would not support a no-confidence motion and argued that he had only supported giving Hodgman an "opportunity" to form government, a promise that he had now fulfilled.

In response to these discussions, the governor ultimately recommissioned Bartlett on 9 April, releasing detailed reasons for his decision. He stated that Bartlett did not have the right to promise power to Hodgman, with the decision of who has the right to form a government the sole prerogative of the governor. As Bartlett, would not give support to Hodgman on matters of supply, he concluded that Hodgman was not in a position to form a government. Instead, he considered that as Bartlett was the current premier, he had a "constitutional obligation" to form a government and test its support at the meeting of the next parliament. This obligation arose regardless of the position of the Greens, as it as a matter for the Assembly as a whole to test or maintain support for the ministry.

Hodgman accused Bartlett of breaking his promise to hand over power, noting that in a letter to the Governor, Bartlett had contradicted a public statement made on 1 April where he had said he would not move any vote of no confidence against a Liberal government. However, Professor Richard Herr of the University of Tasmania had earlier argued that it was likely Bartlett would remain in office. He doubted that the House would reassemble in the week after the writs were returned, and precedent required Underwood to recommission Bartlett and allow Parliament to decide his fate. He added that part of a premier's duty as principal adviser to a governor is to give advice that a governor can legally accept. Constitutional law expert Michael Stokes disagreed, saying too high a bar had been set for the Liberals and Labor had not proven it could deliver stable government in the new Assembly. Academic Anne Twomey argued that the problem arose because Bartlett had neither decided to resign nor ask to be recommissioned. As the incumbent premier, Bartlett would have been entitled to be recommissioned and be given first the opportunity to test his support in the Parliament. Alternatively, had Bartlett resigned the governor would be required to appoint Hodgman as the only other person likely to hold the confidence of the lower house, who would then have the first opportunity to test his support at the first meeting of Parliament.

On the day before the decision was finalised, the Greens indicated that as no party had shown a willingness to negotiate a deal with them, they would neither initiate nor support a vote of no confidence against the Labor government until a deal with either party could be arranged.

On 13 April, to meet the deadline imposed by the Constitution Act 1934, Governor Underwood swore in an interim cabinet, consisting of David Bartlett as Premier, Lara Giddings as Deputy Premier and Attorney-General, and Michael Aird as Treasurer.

On 19 April 2010, after a week of negotiations, Bartlett agreed to a coalition with the Greens. He named McKim as a minister in his cabinet and also named Cassy O'Connor, Greens member for Denison, as cabinet secretary.

On 4 May, the Greens nominated Tim Morris for the position of Deputy Speaker—a surprise for Labor who had nominated Brenton Best. With the support of the Liberals, Morris was elected with 15 votes to Best's 8. On 5 May, the first day of sitting for the new parliament, the Liberals moved a motion of no-confidence against the Bartlett government, which was defeated by Labor and the Greens.

== Opinion polling ==
Polling was conducted every three months by Enterprise Marketing and Research Services (EMRS). The sample size for each poll was 1,000 Tasmanian voters.

=== Voting intention ===
Date	Firm	Sample size	Primary vote				
Date	Firm	Sample size	ALP	LIB	GRN	IND	UND
Feb 2010	EMRS	1,000	23%	30%	22%	2%	23%
Nov 2009	EMRS	1,000	26%	37%	17%	2%	19%
Aug 2009	EMRS	1,000	26%	33%	17%	2%	22%
May 2009	EMRS	1,000	33%	27%	27%	3%	24%
Feb 2009	EMRS	1,000	34%	29%	15%	2%	20%
Nov 2008	EMRS	1,000	30%	26%	18%	1%	23%
Aug 2008	EMRS	1,000	30%	30%	16%	1%	23%
May 2008	EMRS	1,000	25%	31%	18%	2%	22%

=== Leadership approval ===
==== Preferred premier ====
Date	Firm	Sample size	Party leaders			
Date	Firm	Sample size	Bartlett	Hodgman	McKim	Unsure
Feb 2010	EMRS	1,000	29%	34%	21%	18
Nov 2009	EMRS	1,000	28%	40%	19%	
Aug 2009	EMRS	1,000	30%	37%	15%	
May 2009	EMRS	1,000	39%	31%	15%	
Feb 2009	EMRS	1,000	41%	29%	12%	

== See also ==
- Candidates of the 2010 Tasmanian state election
- Members of the Tasmanian House of Assembly, 2010–2014
