= Will Hodgman =

45th Premier of Tasmania, Australia

The Honourable Will Hodgman AC
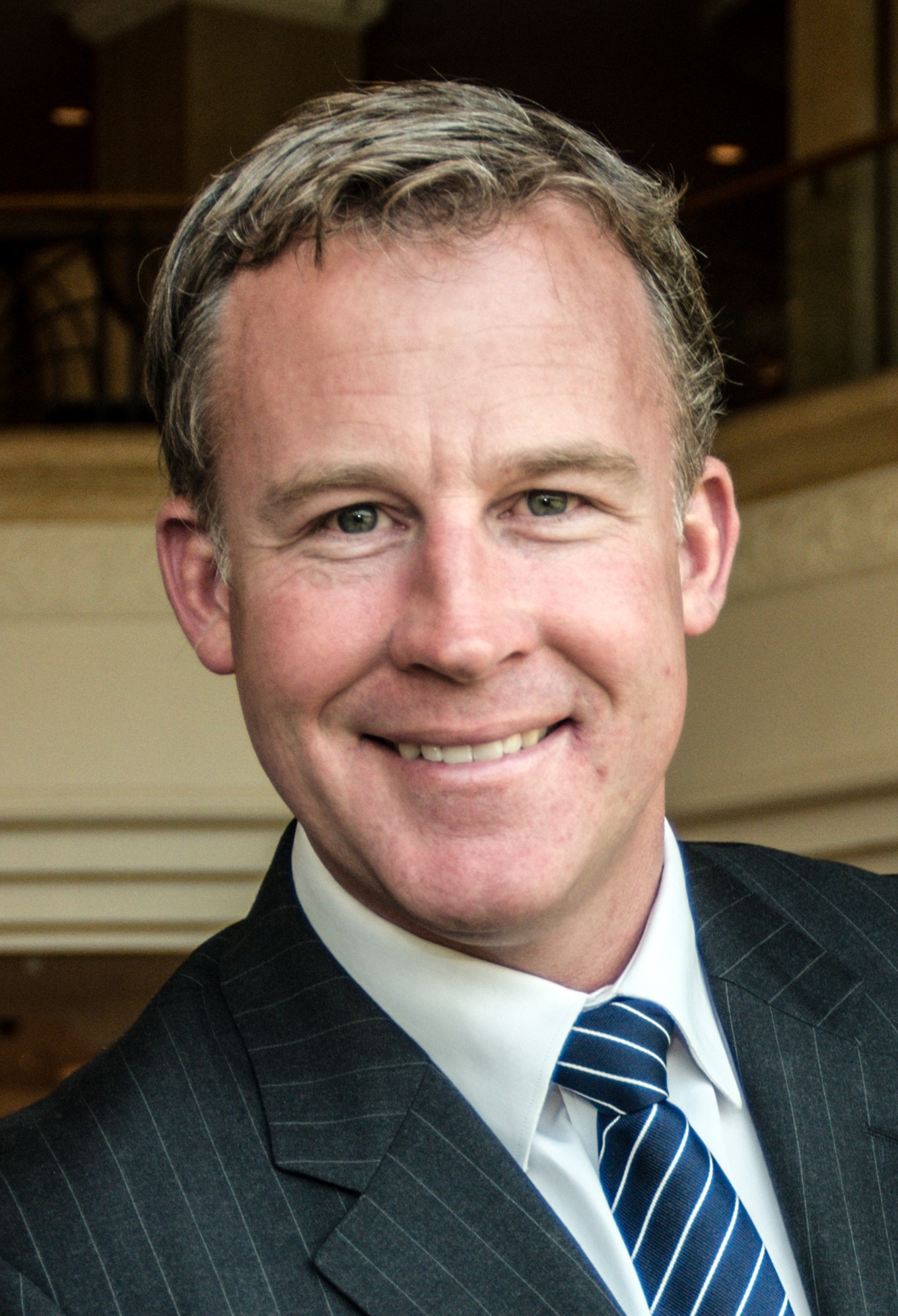
- Hodgman in 2012

18th Australian High Commissioner to Singapore
- In office 9 February 2021 – 9 February 2023
- Prime Minister: Scott Morrison; Anthony Albanese
- Preceded by: Bruce Gosper
- Succeeded by: Allaster Cox

45th Premier of Tasmania
- In office 31 March 2014 – 20 January 2020
- Monarch: Elizabeth II
- Governor: Peter Underwood; Kate Warner
- Deputy: Jeremy Rockliff
- Preceded by: Lara Giddings
- Succeeded by: Peter Gutwein

Leader of the Opposition of Tasmania
- In office 30 March 2006 – 31 March 2014
- Deputy: Jeremy Rockliff
- Preceded by: Rene Hidding
- Succeeded by: Bryan Green

Leader of the Liberal Party of Tasmania
- In office 30 March 2006 – 20 January 2020
- Preceded by: Rene Hidding
- Succeeded by: Peter Gutwein

Member of the Tasmanian Parliament for Franklin
- In office 20 July 2002 – 20 January 2020
- Preceded by: Matt Smith
- Succeeded by: Nic Street

Personal details
- Born: William Edward Felix Hodgman; 20 April 1969 (age 57) Hobart, Tasmania, Australia
- Party: Liberal
- Spouse: Nicola Hodgman
- Relations: Michael Hodgman (father); Bill Hodgman (grandfather); Peter Hodgman (uncle)
- Children: 3
- Education: University of Tasmania

William Edward Felix Hodgman (born 20 April 1969) is a former Australian politician and diplomat. He was the premier of Tasmania from 2014 to 2020 and state leader of the Liberal Party from 2006 to 2020. He later served as High Commissioner of Australia to Singapore from 2021 to 2023.

Hodgman was born into a political family, with his father Michael, uncle Peter, and grandfather Bill Hodgman also serving parliament. He studied arts and law at the University of Tasmania and subsequently worked as a lawyer in Hobart. Hodgman was elected to the Tasmanian House of Assembly at the 2002 state election, standing in the seat of Division of Franklin. He was elected party leader and leader of the opposition in 2006 following the resignation of Rene Hidding. At the 2010 election the Liberals won the most votes, but a hung parliament resulted in Labor continuing in office with Greens support.

At the 2014 election, Hodgman led the Liberals to a landslide victory, forming a majority government for the first time in over 20 years. The party won a second term in 2018 with a slightly reduced share of the vote. In the same year, he succeeded Angus Bethune as the longest-serving leader in the history of the Tasmanian Liberals. He resigned as premier in 2020 after just under six years in office.

== Early life and education ==
Hodgman was born in April 1969, the son of former Liberal parliamentarian Michael Hodgman. His uncle, Peter, was also a Member of the Tasmanian Parliament, and his paternal grandfather, Bill Hodgman, was a member of both Houses of the Tasmanian Parliament, ending his career as President of the Legislative Council.

He was educated at The Hutchins School and the University of Tasmania, where he graduated with a Bachelor of Arts and a Bachelor of Laws in 1993, and a Graduate Certificate in Legal Practice in 1994.

== Family ==
He is married to Nicola, and the couple have two sons, William and James, and a daughter, Lily.

== Legal career ==
Hodgman was admitted as a Barrister and Solicitor in 1994. He was an associate of the Hobart law firm Wallace Wilkinson & Webster, before practising as a solicitor for the Wiltshire County Council in the UK for 15 months.

In the UK, he acted as prosecutor and advocate for the Council in the County Courts and the High Court of Justice. He then returned to Wallace Wilkinson & Webster in 1998, and practised in criminal law and personal injuries until his election to Parliament.

== Political career ==
Hodgman entered Parliament at the 2002 election in the electorate of Franklin and was elected to the role of deputy leader immediately afterwards. He was elected alongside his father, who was elected in the neighbouring seat of Denison.

Hodgman was re-elected in the 2006 election receiving 21.98 per cent of first preferences, an increase compared to his previous vote of 12.37 per cent in the 2002 election. This is the third highest individual vote ever recorded in the seat of Franklin.

On 30 March 2006 he was unanimously elected as the leader of Tasmania's Liberal Party, replacing Rene Hidding following disappointing results at the 2006 election. Jeremy Rockliff is his deputy.

At the 2018 election Hodgman personally received 27,184 first preference votes, the highest number ever for any candidate in a state election in Tasmania.

Hodgman is Tasmania's seventh longest serving Premier, and the fourth-longest serving non-Labor Premier since Federation. As well as serving as Premier, Hodgman has been Tasmania's Attorney General, Minister for Justice, Minister for Tourism, Hospitality and Events, Minister for Trade, Minister for Parks, Minister for Heritage, Minister for Aboriginal Affairs, Minister for the Arts, Minister for Sport and Recreation, Minister for the Prevention of Family Violence and Minister for Advanced Manufacturing and Defence Industries.

Hodgman held a number of shadow portfolios in his parliamentary career, including Treasury and Finance, Energy, Major Projects and Community Development, Tourism, Economic Development and the Arts.

=== 2010 election ===
Hodgman contested the 2010 Tasmanian state election and the result was a hung parliament, with the Liberals and Labor on 10 seats each. The balance of power rested with the Tasmanian Greens, who won five seats. Before the election, the incumbent Premier David Bartlett stated that the party who won the most votes should form government. Since the Liberals won the popular vote by just over 6,700 votes, Bartlett and his caucus voted to give up power, and Bartlett advised the Governor of Tasmania, Peter Underwood, to invite Hodgman to form a government.

However, Hodgman never approached the Greens before the writs were returned, and Bartlett did not promise a Hodgman minority government would have a minimum period of support. Faced with the prospect of a government being defeated at its first sitting, Underwood recommissioned Bartlett as premier and left it to the Assembly to determine whether Labor had enough support to govern. Hodgman accused Bartlett of going back on a promise not to topple a Liberal minority government.

=== 2014 election ===
Before the 2014 Tasmanian state election, with polls suggesting the Liberals were positioned to win government, Hodgman had promised that he would only govern in majority. ABC News election analyst Antony Green suggested Hodgman's promise could have come back to haunt him if the Palmer United Party, which made a significant effort in the election, were to siphon off enough votes to deny the Liberals a majority.

On election night, Hodgman led the Liberal Party to victory with a swing of over 9% against the incumbent Labor Party. The Liberals picked up an additional seat in every electorate except Denison, assuring that Hodgman would have a secure majority. They ultimately went on to win 15 seats–a comprehensive victory under Tasmanian electoral practice of the time.

Hodgman himself topped the poll in Franklin, tallying 23,589 first preference votes on 35 percent of the first preference vote; the total number of electors in Franklin is 74,189. This result was achieved despite competing against both Giddings and Greens leader Nick McKim in this multi-member electorate. Hodgman was sworn in as the 45th Premier of Tasmania, alongside the members of his cabinet, on 31 March 2014, becoming only the fifth non-Labor premier in 80 years and only the third to govern in majority.

=== 2018 election ===
Hodgman dissolved the parliament and called the election for March 3. Repeating his vow of four years earlier, Hodgman categorically ruled out governing in coalition or minority, saying, "We will govern alone or not at all." However it was thought unlikely at the time that the Liberals would keep their majority due to the strong polling of the Greens and the Jacqui Lambie Network.

During the campaign, Hodgman and the Liberals promised to keep poker machines in pubs and clubs. He claimed 5000 jobs were at risk if machines were banned, although fact checkers called this claim overblown.

The day before the election it was revealed that the Liberals had privately indicated to farming stakeholders they might relax the state's gun laws. The move was criticised by some opponents.

Ultimately, the Liberals suffered a swing of two seats, leaving them at 13 seats, just enough for a majority. It was only the second time in 87 years that the non-Labor forces in Tasmania had been reelected with an outright majority. Hodgman personally received 27,184 first preference votes, which is the highest number ever in a Tasmanian state election.

On 14 January 2020, Hodgman announced his resignation as premier, and confirmed he would also resign from state parliament. In his resignation speech, he cited the toll on his family; his 17 years in the legislature had been concurrent with the "entire lives" of his three children. On 20 January, Treasurer Peter Gutwein was elected unopposed as Liberal leader, and was sworn in as premier later that day.

Hodgman is one of the few Australian state politicians to have never spent a day on the backbench. He spent his entire tenure in the House of Assembly in a leadership position as deputy opposition leader (2002–2006), opposition leader (2006–2014) and premier (2014–2020).

Prior to his resignation there was speculation that Hodgman would stay on as premier to surpass Robin Gray as the state's longest serving Liberal Premier.

=== Career after politics ===
On 15 April 2020, Hodgman was announced as the inaugural chair of the new Australian Business Growth Fund.

In November 2020, Hodgman was appointed the next Australian High Commissioner to Singapore. He officially took up the position on 9 February 2021 when he presented his credentials to the President of Singapore Halimah Yacob. His term concluded on 13 February 2023 consistent with the Albanese Government’s decision to re-examine supposed political appointments to high commissions and ambassadorships.

Hodgman was appointed as an adjunct professor at the University of Tasmania in 2023.

He was appointed a Companion of the Order of Australia in the 2026 King's Birthday Honours for "eminent service to the people and Parliament of Tasmania, to economic growth and policy reform, to the law, and to the community".

== See also ==
- Political families of Australia

Tasmanian House of Assembly
Preceded by Paul Lennon; Martin McManus; Neville Oliver; Matt Smith; Paula Wriedt	Member for Franklin; 2002–2020; Served alongside: Ross Butler (2008–2010); Lara Giddings (2002–2018); Daniel Hulme (2009–2010); Paul Lennon (2002–2008); Nick McKim (2008–2015); David O'Byrne (2010–2014); Jacquie Petrusma (2010–2022); Paul Harriss (2014–2016)	Succeeded by David O'Byrne; Jacquie Petrusma; Alison Standen; Nic Street; Rosalie Woodruff
Political offices
Preceded by Rene Hidding	Leader of the Opposition of Tasmania; 2006–2014	Succeeded by Bryan Green
Preceded by Lara Giddings	Premier of Tasmania; 2014–2020	Succeeded by Peter Gutwein
Party political offices
Preceded by Rene Hidding	Leader of the Liberal Party in Tasmania; 2006–2020	Succeeded by Peter Gutwein
