= Forestry Building, Hobart =

Building complex in Tasmania

Coordinates: 42.8806°S 147.3232°E

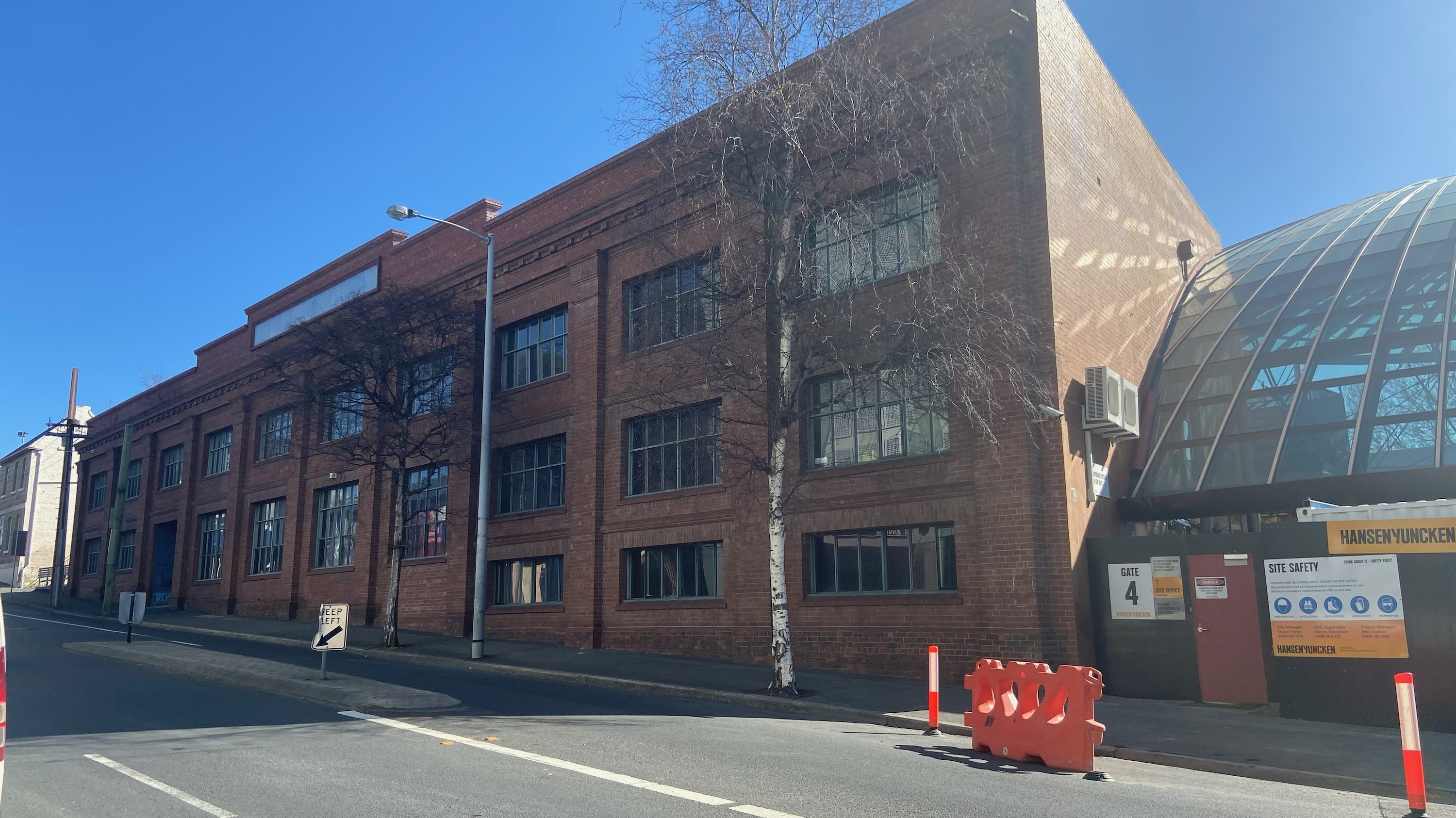
Forestry building, Hobart

The Forestry building is a heritage-listed complex situated at 79–93 Melville Street, Hobart, Tasmania.

It is made up of the former Crisp & Gunn offices and workshop, and Forestry Tasmania dome. The complex is located in the central business district of Hobart. The building complex extends along the north side of Melville Street, between Elizabeth and Murray Streets.

== History ==
Crisp and Gunn Co-Operative Ltd. was the amalgamation of two prosperous family timber firms in Tasmania. The Crisp side was established in 1848 in Hobart. By 1897, the Crisp family business was managed by Messrs Ernest and Samuel Crisp. In 1902, Ernest Crisp joined with Frederick Crisp to manage the company in Melville Street.‌ The Gunn family in Launceston commenced business as timber merchants in 1875. In 1907 John and Thomas Gunn came to Hobart. In 1908, the Gunn family's southern interests amalgamated with the Crisp family and so formed the registered company of Crisp and Gunn timber merchants.

On 30 June 1908 the registered company produced its Memorandum and Articles of Association. There was $20,000 in capital which was divided into 20,000 shares equally between the Crisp and Gunn families. The first Secretary was Frederick Vernon Crisp.

The Crisp and Gunn Corporative Ltd was a very successful business. It sourced its timber from the West and Northwest coast of Tasmania. Huon pine and King William pine were brought from the West coast by ship and train. Large shipments of softwoods, including Oregon pine continually arrived from America. kauri pine arrived from New Zealand and cedar from Queensland.

=== New building ===
On the night of 13 May 1922 a fire broke out in the Crisp and Gunn building which demolished the offices and gutted the factory. A replacement building was put in place as soon as possible. G Stanley Crisp was appointed architect and tenders were called. The tender was won by William Cooper and Sons of Molle Street, Hobart for $8000. Claude Cooper one of William's sons and was the main contractor. The building of Crisp and Gunn in Melville Street, Hobart was completed in 1923 and described as a "very fine main building with its imposing and comfortable interior equipment, the neighbouring joinery factory and the commodious ironmongery, paint, glass and other stores which are so well stocked and easily accessible".

=== State Government ownership ===
The Crisp and Gunn building was bought by the Tasmanian State government in 1968. From 1971 to 1994 it was used by the State Emergency Service and the State Fire Commission. During this time, additional government departments also used the building to store equipment and materials.

=== Forestry Tasmania dome and redevelopment ===
In 1994 Forestry Tasmania had offices there. In 1997 Morris-Nunn and Associates were commissioned to use timber products to showcase wood products and wood uses. The centrepiece of the redevelopment being a 22-metre dome shaped conservatory. Large Oregon and hardwood trusses were salvaged from the original buildings and were used to create pyramid roofs and a high pedestrian bridge across the natural forest of trees.

The building won the Australasian Lightweight Structures Award 1998 and was a finalist in the 1998 National Architecture Awards.

In 2010 protestors forced the evacuation of the Forestry Tasmania offices after flares were set off in the Forestry Tasmania dome. The protest was against forest regeneration burns.

In 2017 Forestry Tasmania vacated the Forestry building as a cost saving measure after reporting a loss of $24.1 million and the internal forest was removed. In February 2018,Tasmania Police was set to occupy the building. The Hobart City Council approved an application from Police to demolish part of the building but it did not proceed when it was "agreed that it would be best for both parties not to enter into any lease agreement".

=== University of Tasmania redevelopment ===
The building was bought in 2018 by the University of Tasmania. The University of Tasmania reported in January 2023 that the Forestry building "will be restored and given new life as an inner-city hub for the learning, research and collaboration over the next two years". The project will also restore the living forest to the dome.

An additional alteration to plan was made for a pedestrian bridge linking the Brisbane Street footpath level to Level 2 of the approved building.

== Heritage registration ==
In 2021 the Forestry building complex came under a provisional Heritage Tasmania registration.

The heritage listing for the Forestry building describes it as a complex formed by three connected structures:

- Crisp & Gunn offices (including high brick parapet wall along the eastern boundary),
- Forestry Tasmania dome, and
- Crisp & Gunn workshop (including low brick wall along western boundary).
