= Tasmanian Forests Intergovernmental Agreement =

The Tasmanian Forests Intergovernmental Agreement (TFIA) is an agreement between the Commonwealth of Australia and the State of Tasmania. It is designed to create additional areas of forest reserves in the State of Tasmania, while ensuring ongoing wood supply for the forest industry. It was signed by Australian Prime Minister, Julia Gillard, and Tasmania's Premier, Lara Giddings, on August 7, 2011.

== Background ==
Forestry has long been a contentious issue in Tasmania, which is home to the world's first environmental political party, the Tasmanian Greens, reflecting the high level of environmental awareness in the state.

The Agreement resulted from Round Table discussions in 2010 between the Tasmania’s forest industry and environmental movement, which sought to end more than 30 years of animosity between the parties.

The main driver of the talks was the decision of Tasmania’s largest private forestry company, Gunns Limited, to exit native forest harvesting and focus on developing its proposed plantation-based pulp mill at Bell Bay in the north of the State. This decision led to a need to restructure the forest industry, and also created an opportunity to reserve additional areas of native forests.

The Round Table discussions culminated in the Tasmanian Forests Statement of Principles to Lead to an Agreement. The Statement of Principles sought support from the Australian and Tasmanian Governments to protect an additional 430,000 hectares of forests claimed by environmental groups to be of high conservation value, while ensuring a sustainable supply of native forest and plantation timbers to the forest industry.

The TFIA provided a financial package of AUD 277 million to:

- support logging contractors to leave the industry following the decision of Gunns Limited, to exit native forest harvesting;
- protect and manage new forest reserves;
- fund regional development projects; and
- fund mental health counselling and community wellbeing projects.

The Agreement also established an Independent Verification Group to assess the conservation values and timber supply requirements from within the areas nominated by the environmental movement for additional forest reserves. All stakeholders involved in the Agreement agreed to the Independent Verification process.

In accordance with Clause 36 of the Agreement, the Commonwealth of Australia, the State of Tasmania and the State-owned forest management corporation, Forestry Tasmania, signed a Conservation Agreement that provided interim protection for the areas of forest under assessment, while allowing Forestry Tasmania to meet is contracted wood supply obligations, until the expected conclusion of the process on 30 June 2012.

== Signatories ==
The signatories to the Statement of Principles were, in alphabetical order:

- Australian Conservation Foundation
- The Australian Forest Contractors' Association
- The Construction, Forest, Mining and Energy Union
- Environment Tasmania Inc
- The Forest Industries Association of Tasmania
- The National Association of Forestry
- Tasmanian Country Sawmillers' Foundation
- The Tasmanian Forest Contractors' Association
- Timber Communities Australia Ltd
- The Wilderness Society

== Current status ==
The Independent Verification Group delivered its reports on 23 March 2012. The purpose of the reports is to provide the environmental and forestry groups involved in the Agreement with the information required to negotiate a final agreement. The Tasmanian Government was expected to introduce legislation to the State Parliament by 30 June 2012 to implement the final agreement.
