= Forestry in Tasmania =

Forestry in Tasmania Australia has been conducted since early European settlement. The logging of old growth native forests in the state has been opposed by environmentalists and others via means such as lobbying, legislation and blockades.

== Early history ==
Forest conservation and reservation in the nineteenth century Tasmania was controlled under the title of the Waste Lands Act.

- Imperial Governments 1842 Act - enabled the Van Diemen's Land Governor was able to grant "Licences for the felling, removal and sale of timber from such lands"
- Waste Land Act (1863) - made it possible for further licensing for forest activities was possible after Van Diemen's Land become Tasmania in 1856.
- Waste Lands Act (1881) - provided for land reservation for the preservation of timber. In 1885 the State Forests Act preservation and policing were not well organised and the management of forests was considered "chaotic".
- Crown Lands Act (1890) - saw the Crown Lands Act repealed and consolidated, along with the Waste Lands Act, and State Forests act of 1885.
- Forestry Act (1920) - established the Tasmania Forestry Department
- Kermandi Woodpulp and Paper Industry Act (1926)
- Florentine Valley Paper Industry Act (1932)

== Troubles ==
The condition of the industry after the 1930s had created a situation where the following reports and commission attempted to resolve the issues:

- Galbraith Report 1940–1941
- Kessell report 1945
- Royal Commission of 1946

== Resolution ==
- Forestry Commission 15 April 1947

== Tasmanian Forest Administration ==
Current government administration of the forest estate is by Forestry Tasmania.

== Districts ==
The older administrative regions were:

- North West Region
  - Smithton (1)
  - Burnie (2)
  - Queenstown (3)
  - Devonport (4)
- North East Region
  - Deloraine (5)
  - Launceston (6)
  - Scottsdale (7)
  - Fingal (8)
- South East Region
  - Norfolk (9)
  - Triabunna (10)
  - Geeveston (11)

== Exemption from Freedom of Information Act and subsequent repeal ==
After the passage of the Forestry Amendment (Forestry Corporation) Act 1994, the Tasmanian forest industry became exempt from requests to provide disclosure of sensitive public information under the Freedom of Information Act signed into legislation in 1991. This was done through the addition of section 32A into the Act expressly exempting Forestry Tasmania and the Forestry Corporation from requests under this law.

A later Bill of Parliament introduced into law in 2004 repealed section 32A of the Freedom of Information, thus reverting the exemption granted in 1994.

== 2010 ==
The current administrative areas are:

- Murchison (formerly 1, 2, 3)
- Mersey (formerly 4, 5)
- Bass (formerly 6, 7, 8)
- Derwent (formerly 9, 10)
- Huon (formerly 11)

== See also ==
- Forests of Australia
- Forests Commission Victoria
- Forestry in New Zealand
- Woodchipping in Australia
- Upper Florentine Valley
- Gunns Limited
- Tasmanian Forests Intergovernmental Agreement
