= Mark O'Connor (poet) =

Australian poet and writer

Mark O'Connor OAM
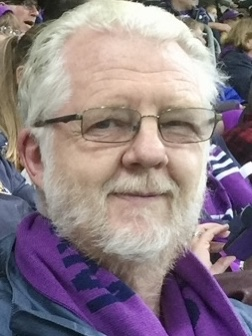
- Born: 19 March 1945 (age 81); Melbourne, Australia
- Education: Melbourne University
- Occupations: Poet; environmental writer and activist; anthologist
- Spouse: Janet Eagleton
- Writing career
- Language: English
- Genres: Poetry, prose, verse translations of Shakespeare
- Notable works: The Olive Tree: Collected Poems; Two Centuries of Australian Poetry (as anthologist)
- Website: australianpoet.com/about.html

Mark O'Connor OAM (born 1945) is an Australian poet, writer, inventor, and environmental activist, who has been a councillor (2012–2014) of the Australian Conservation Foundation. A major focus of O'Connor's work has been upon increasing the audience for poetry in English. His poetry has also involved co-operation with environmental scientists at various institutions. He has said he seeks to help Australians appreciate the variety and value of their own landscapes, and to adapt a European language (English) to regions for which it still lacks vocabulary. He is the author of twelve books of poetry, several of which deal with regions of Australia such as the Great Barrier Reef and the Blue Mountains, often collaborating with well-known nature photographers. He is also strongly interested in other languages and cultures. In 1977-1980 he travelled in Europe on a Marten Bequest Fellowship to write poetry about the Mediterranean region. He is the editor of the Oxford University Press anthology Two Centuries of Australian Poetry.

In 2000 he became the first "Olympic poet" of the modern Olympiads, receiving an Australia Council fellowship "to report in poetry upon all aspects of the Sydney 2000 Olympic Games". He has also written short stories, literary criticism, and two books on the issue of overpopulation as a danger to environments. He has won numerous national and international prizes and awards, and has undertaken fellowships or writers-in-residency in several countries including United States, Europe, Russia, China and India. More recently he has produced updated verse-translations of some of Shakespeare's 400-year-old plays into lightly modernized English. He lives with his wife Jan Eagleton/O'Connor in Canberra.

== Biography and career ==
Mark O'Connor was born in Melbourne in 1945, the son of Kevin John O'Connor, later the Chief Stipendiary Magistrate of Victoria, and of Elaine Riordan/O'Connor, a journalist. He attended Xavier College in Melbourne, graduating as dux in 1961. In 1965 he graduated BA Hons 1 from Melbourne University with Honours in English and Classics. Post 1965 he taught English literature at the University of Western Australia and the Australian National University.

He broke onto the literary scene when his first published poems won the Poetry Australia Biennial Poetry Prize in 1973, and again in 1975. Around this time he worked briefly as a diver at One-Tree Island on the Great Barrier Reef, and he was also the gardener at the Dunk Island Resort in 1976–77. His 1978 poem Planting the Dunk Botanic Gardens, which describes his attempt to revive and expand Edmund James Banfield's project of planting "every tropical fruit tree" on Dunk Island, was later developed into a play, which was presented at the Edinburgh Festival in 2007 and in Adelaide at the Holden St Theatre in 2009.

In 1977 he received a Marten Bequest fellowship to write poetry about the Mediterranean world. During his travels, he spent three winters house-sitting for the actress Miriam Margolyes in Italy, and writing about Italian village life. In 1979 a story set in that village (Montisi) won the London Times's short story contest, which gave him the funds to return to Australia in early 1980; but he has maintained links with Italy. O'Connor's first book of largely European poems The Eating Tree (1980) and his subsequent early Selected Poems (1986) showed a move from the natural world towards more human-centred themes, and attracted attention from European critics. Emeritus Professor Michel Fabre of the Sorbonne called O'Connor's "a mind full of sensitivity and passion to new probings or to sometimes disenchanted narrations (contatations)". Fabre added that O'Connor excelled in:

(re-)discovering, from a new viewpoint, places to which our Greco-Latin culture would attach a supposedly precise and limited connotation. Under the regard of O'Connor, for example, the icons of St Titus's church in Heraklion become for us as much "strangers" as the rock-carvings of the Aborigines. . . . Using language itself, he questions our relationship to the "referent", and also the assumptions that lie behind human communication. All this with discretion, unobtrusively. Though he uses the modes of possibility rather than of assertion, he lays claim for us all to the wholeness of a global culture.

In 1980 he taught Professional Writing at the University of Canberra, but thereafter returned to North Queensland and reverted to being a professional poet, though he did terms as writer in residence at several Australian universities. In 1988 he married the former James Cook University administrator Jan Eagleton, having followed her to Canberra when her career took her to the Australian National University in 1987. As an interviewer for the Australian National Library's Oral History Unit, he helped to record the oral histories of A D Hope and other literary figures. He has won numerous literary awards.

In the 1980s and 1990s he compiled and edited the much re-printed Oxford anthology Two Centuries of Australian Poetry (1988, revised 1996) which was structured by themes to present the main "conversations" of the nation. This was one of the first general anthologies to integrate and emphasize the poetry of Aboriginal experiences, of immigrants' experiences, of women's experiences, and of "Accepting a Landscape".

Subsequently, he published two prose books on overpopulation as a neglected cause of environmental damage: This Tired Brown Land (1998) and, more recently, Overloading Australia (2008, 2010, co-written with William J. Lines). Through the 1990s he was National Vice-president of Sustainable Population Australia, whose patrons included the fellow authors Judith Wright, Tim Flannery, Mary White and Fr Paul Collins, and often spoke on the media. In 1999 he was appointed H.C. Coombs Creative Arts Fellow at the Australian National University.

In 2000 he was given a grant from the Australia Council for the Arts to write poetry about the 2000 Olympic Games. The grant included, in some cases, the demanding requirement of "next day after an event" poem completion, so it would be available for radio and television. An example was his poem "Coming Home Strong: for Cathy Freeman", which he read on the ABC Radio National Breakfast Program the morning after she won the Women's 400 Metres event.

In 2000, O'Connor published an updated "Collected Poems", viz. The Olive Tree: Collected Poems of Mark O'Connor. In addition to his own poetry, since 2002, he has translated 3 of Shakespeare's 400-year-old plays (in verse but into more intelligible lightly modernized modern English). The three plays are: Twelfth Night, Henry IV Part 1, and Troilus and Cressida. Philippa Kelly, Resident Dramaturg at the California Shakespeare Theater, has described his translations as "nuanced, precise and inconspicuous, releasing Shakespeare's playtext into the modern world". In September 2016 O'Connor received a PhD in Shakespearian Studies from the University of Western Australia for his translations.

In 2001 he was a significant contributor to the Oxford University Press book Protected Area Management on techniques for managing national parks.

He is also the inventor and patent awardee for the Pro-NOUNCE-it software that allows individual readers to selectively display the pronunciation of English words without changing the spelling.

O'Connor's work on discovering, grafting, and breeding new fruiting cultivars of feijoa (Feijoa sellowiana), has often been documented in The Canberra Times, and in 2013 he donated a plantation of 40 cultivars of feijoa to the Lindsay Pryor National Arboretum.

== Increasing the audience for poetry in English ==
The fifth edition of the Oxford University Press Anthology "Seven Centuries of Poetry in English" (2003) gives O'Connor more space than any poet of later birth-date than Seamus Heaney, born 1939, and its editor John Leonard has described O'Connor as, "that rare thing, a genuinely popular poet of real power and complexity". The Australian poet Les Murray endorsed him as "our Olympic poet. He is a conservationist with a scientific muse, yet has the polished verbal gold of a classicist"; while Manning Clark praised the accessibility of O'Connor's verse and described him as "a man who is singing to those who have ears to hear, a hymn in praise to life." The Oxford Companion to Australian Literature calls his 1990 Fire-Stick Farming,

A remarkably fine collection, which reinforces the impression that O'Connor's poetry draws strongly on the external natural scene, and the diversity of flora, fauna, and landscapes. Interwoven with these externals, however, are frequent sensitive insights into the nature of existence itself. A poet who has won a popular following, O'Connor has also won a reputation as one of Australia's major contemporary nature poets.

== Collaborations with environmental scientists ==
The Oxford Companion to Australian Literature describes O'Connor as "... a knowledgeable amateur biologist, [who] has had a lifelong concern for the Australian environment and its protection." O'Connor has worked closely with environmental scientists at the Museum of Victoria, where he served as the Thomas Ramsay Science and Humanities Scholar (1987–1988), and also at the Australian National University. In 1999 he began a three-year term as visiting fellow in the ANU's Department of Archaeology and Natural History, working with Professors Geoffrey Hope and Rhys Jones. O'Connor had previously used Jones's phrase fire-stick farming as the title of one of his collections of poetry about regions of Australia.

In 2013 he presented, at the National Museum's Day of Celebration of the Life of Mike Smith, as a long-time friend and an admirer of Smith's work, a 5-part poem "Desert Archaeology" describing Smith's exploration of the Puritjarra rock-shelter:

. . . That first trench
Is a manhole inserted intuitively into Time.
100 years in a spade-spit is large-print history.
10,000 years in 4 millimetres is telephone-book fine ....
And sudden as if you'd been served with a summons
The stencilled hands remind
That this cave which you've found
Is not yours, and not found by you.

== Poetry in civil celebrancy ==
O'Connor is a strong supporter of the civil celebrancy movement, and of the views of Dally Messenger III, who as principal of the International College of Celebrancy advocated the use of poems or prose-poems, chosen by the couple in consultation with their celebrant, in place of the traditional religious marriage ceremonies. O'Connor, who held a civil celebrant's licence himself from 2004 to 2015, taught professional development courses on ceremonial performance. In these he argued that, "Poetry is memorable speech: rich and evocative memorable speech that is designed to be physically rolled in the mouth." His essays on poetry as a physical art can be found on the International College of Celebrancy's website.

O'Connor's MSS are held in the University of NSW and National Library collections.

== Honours and recognition ==
O'Connor was awarded the Medal of the Order of Australia in the 2024 King's Birthday Honours for "service to literature as a poet and educator".
