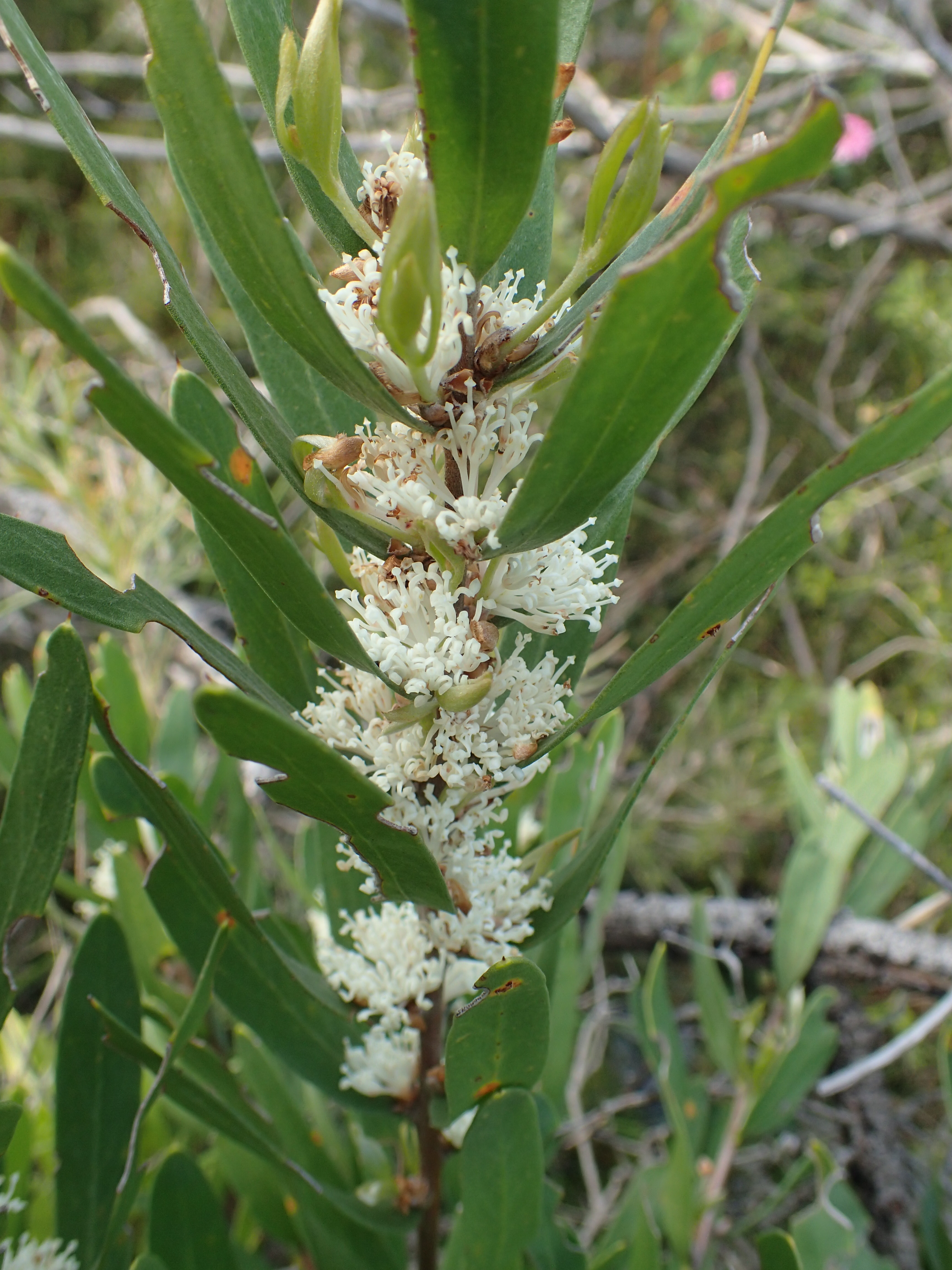
- Hakea oleifolia growing on the Bibbulmun Track near Walpole

Scientific classification
- Kingdom: Plantae
- Clade: Tracheophytes
- Clade: Angiosperms
- Clade: Eudicots
- Order: Proteales
- Family: Proteaceae
- Genus: Hakea
- Species: H. oleifolia

Binomial name
- Hakea oleifolia R.Br.
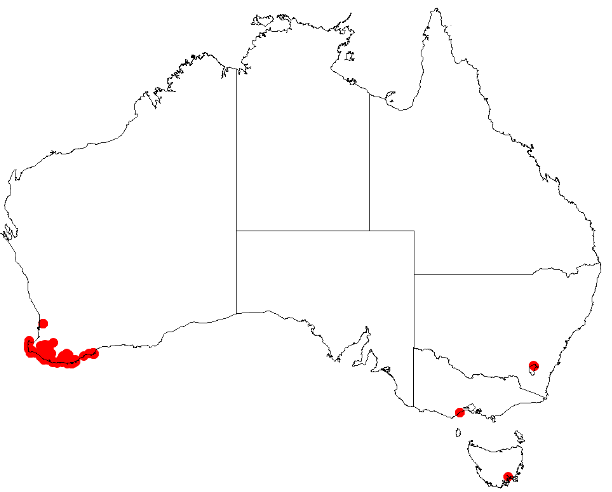
- Occurrence data from AVH

= Hakea oleifolia =

Species of plant endemic to Western Australia

Hakea oleifolia, commonly known as dungyn, or the olive-leaved hakea, is a shrub or tree of the family Proteaceae and is endemic to an area along the south coast in the South West and Great Southern regions of Western Australia.

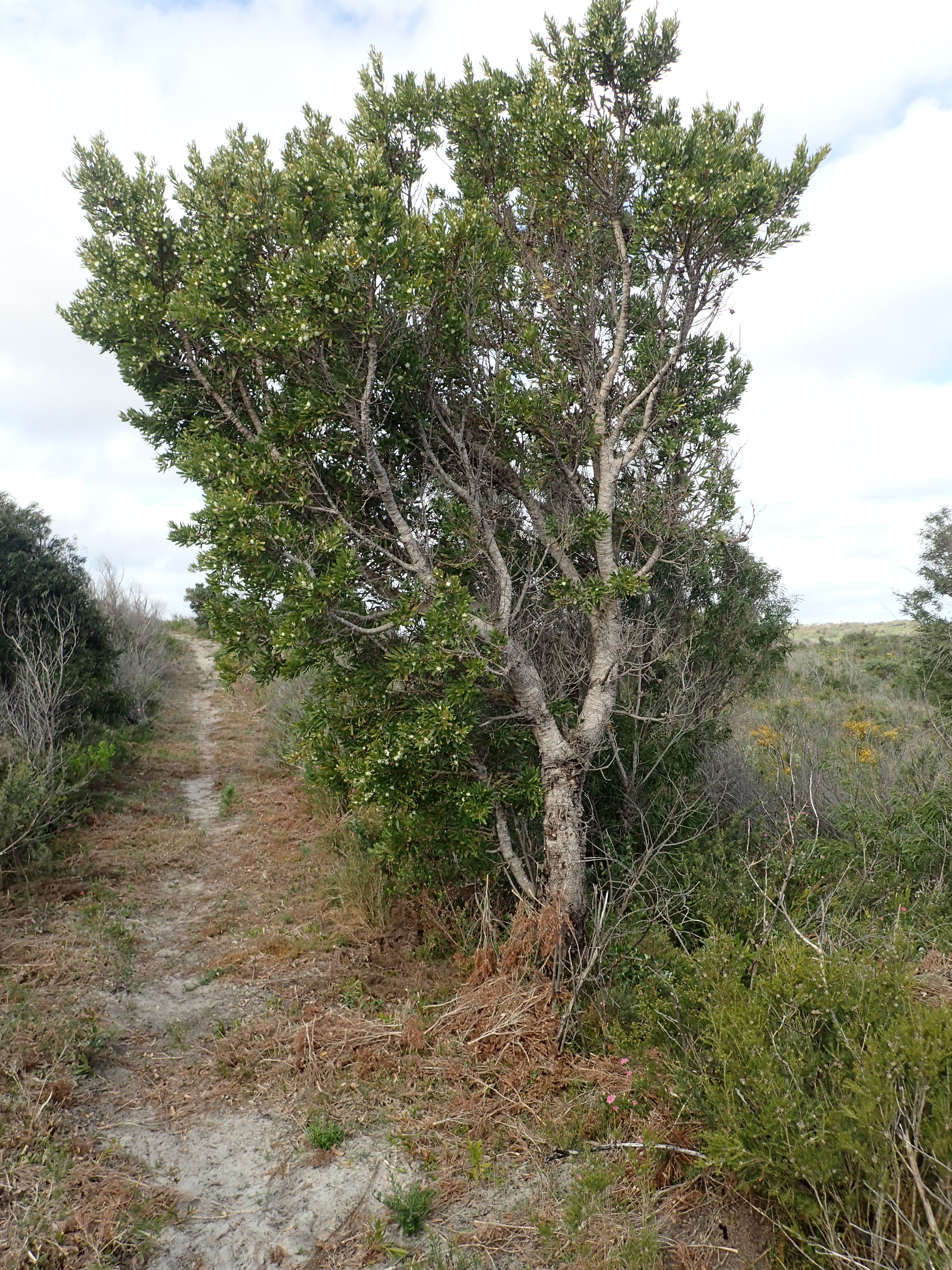
Habit

== Description ==
Hakea oleifolia is an upright, rounded shrub or tree that typically grows to a height of 2 to 10 metres (6.6 to 32.8 ft). It blooms from August to October and produces strong sweetly scented white large flowers on short racemes in leaf axils. Up to 28 showy flowers may appear per raceme. Leaves are elliptic olive-like 3–9 cm (1–4 in) long by 0.5–2.5 cm (0.2–1 in) wide and smooth edged or sparsely toothed. The ovoid fruit are horned woody capsules 2–3 cm (0.8–1 in) long by 1–2 cm (0.4–0.8 in) wide and taper to two prominent horns.

== Taxonomy and naming ==
Hakea oleifolia was first formally described by Carl Meisner in 1856 and the description published in Transactions of the Linnean Society. Named from the genus Olea- olive and from the Latin folium 'leaf', referring to the resemblance of the leaf to that of the olive tree.

== Distribution and habitat ==
Olive-leaved hakea grows in the wet south-western tip of Western Australia from Busselton to Bremer Bay. An understorey plant growing in woodland and coastal locations withstanding salt-laden winds on clay, sand, loam and gravelly soils. A frost-tolerant species requiring a well-drained site.

== Conservation status ==
Hakea oleifolia is classified as "not threatened" by the Western Australian Government.

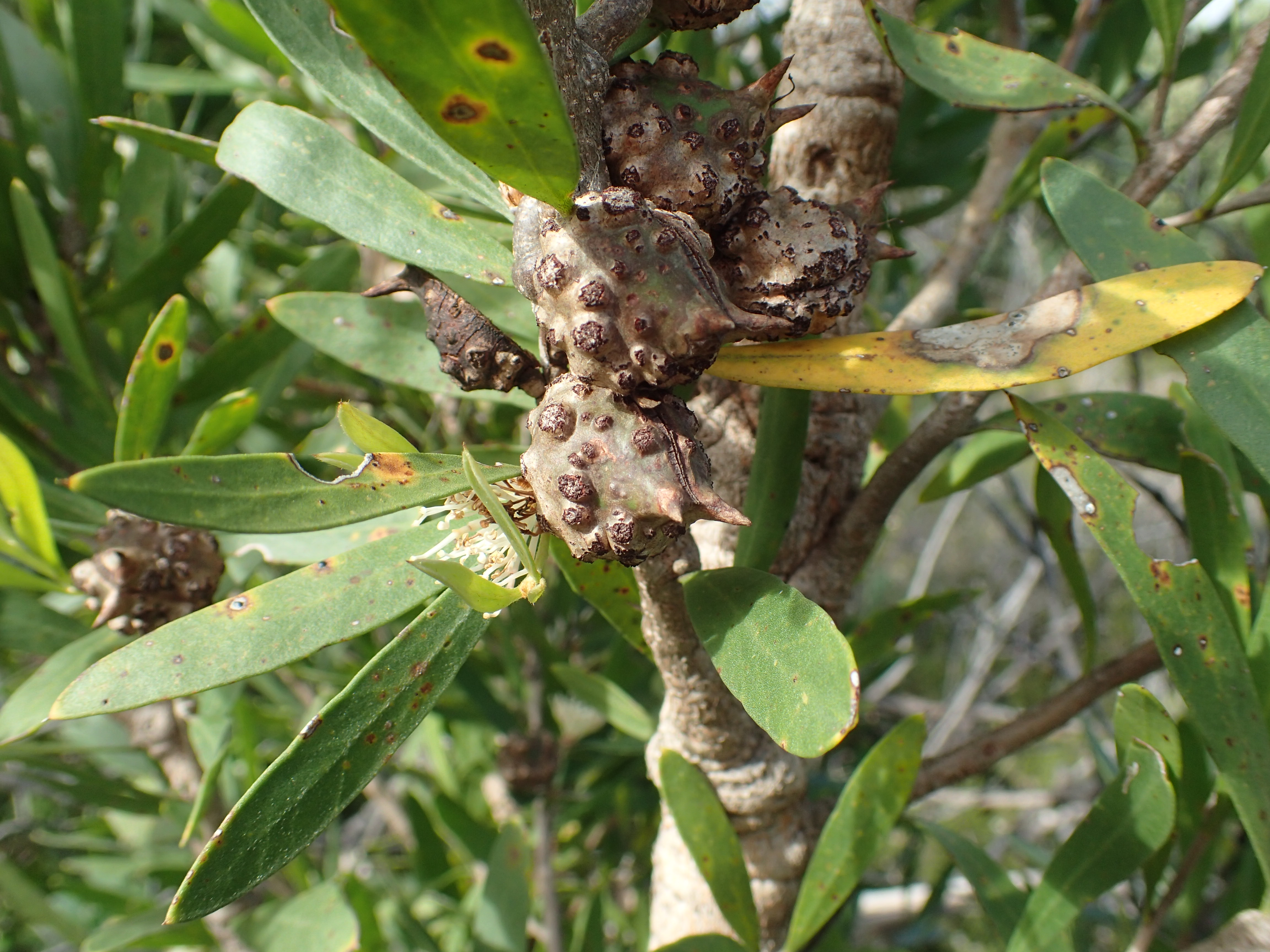
Fruit of H. oleifolia
