= Private Forests Act 1994 =

1993-1999
- Enacted by: Governor of Tasmania
- Assented to: May 10, 1994

The Private Forests Act 1994 established an authority to provide assistance and advice on private forest management, to prescribe the functions and powers of that authority, to provide for related matters and to amend certain acts. The act created Private Forests Tasmania, a body corporate with perpetual succession, with seal and may sue and be sued in its corporate name.

The act was given royal assent on May 10, 1994.

The act, under schedule 1, set out the broad objective of the authority which is to "facilitate and expand the development of the private forest resource in Tasmania in a manner which is consistent with sound forest land management practice" .

== Objectives of the Authority ==
Schedule 1 of the Act details a set of Objectives for the Authority; which are-

(a) to promote the development of private forestry in Tasmania;
(b) to foster competitive markets for private forest growers;
(c) to provide strategic planning and policy direction for private forestry in Tasmania;
(d) to foster progressive and incremental funding from all private forest growers to fund the Authority;
(e) to foster commercial wood production forestry on private land in Tasmania;
(f) to foster the use and values of trees in sustainable land management.

== Functions of the authority ==
The Authority functions include supporting the Minister and Government (a); supporting the implementation of the Forest Practices Act (c) and (g); marketing of wood (d), (e) and (f); supporting conservation (j) and (h); support for non commercial forestry (k) and finally promotion of research and education (i).

Under section 6(1) of the Act, the functions of the Authority are as follows:

(a) to advise the Minister on all matters relating to private forestry;
(b) to provide assistance and advice on forest management for commercial purposes and on the use of trees for sustainable land management;
(c) to process applications for private timber reserves under the Forest Practices Act 1985 pursuant to a delegation from the Forest Practices Authority under that Act;
(d) to promote opportunities for more competitive markets for private forest owners;
(e) to advise, assist and facilitate the private forest sector in the development of commercial infrastructure;
(f) to maintain and update an inventory of private forests, prepare five-yearly reviews of private forests and report on compliance with export and other licence conditions as required by any agreement entered into between the State and the Commonwealth;
(g) to provide advice and assistance to the Forest Practices Authority for implementation of the Forest Practices Act 1985 on private forest lands;
(h) to provide co-ordinated input on behalf of private forest growers on land use issues;
(i) to promote private forestry research and education;
(j) to examine matters relating to the conservation of flora, fauna, land forms, cultural heritage and care of the environment on private forest lands;
(k) to encourage non-commercial forestry on private land including strategic planning and appropriate technical and policy development;
(l) to develop plans to deliver funding for private forestry programmes from private forest owners;
(m) to perform such other functions as are imposed on it by this or any other Act.

In respect of Function (f) "to maintain and update an inventory of private forests, prepare five-yearly reviews of private forests and report on compliance with export and other licence conditions as required by any agreement entered into between the State and the Commonwealth", the compliance with export and other licence condition requirements was removed with the signing of the Tasmanian Regional Forest Agreement November 1997.

Funds are provided to the Authority by Parliament for only functions (a), (g), (h), (i), (j) and (k). In August 2001 a new Division was added to the Act (Division 1A - Private Forest service levy) which caused a levy to be paid on the net area of private forest, certified under a forest practice plan for harvest or regeneration or being established to plantation.

== Powers of the Authority ==
The Authority does have the power to provide financial assistance for private commercial forestry (Section 26 of the Act). When established in 1994 Private Forests Tasmania reported in their Annual Report 1994-95 a sum of AUS$1,730,000 as loans for private forestry. This sum related to a Pine Loan Scheme operated by Private Forest Division when it was part of the Forestry Commission. The Forestry Commission in 1994 became Forestry Tasmania and in July 2017 Sustainable Timber Tasmania. No additional loan funds have been provided under the Act since the formation of the Authority.

The Authority can borrow funds from the Treasurer (Section 23 of the Act) and enter into Joint Ventures to grow wood (Section 30 of the Act). The Authority has not exercised these powers since its creation.

== Role of the Minister ==
Under Section 19A there is a requirement for a Ministerial Charter which is to specify the broad policy expectations of the Minister for the Authority. The Minister may limit the functions and powers of the Authority and the performance and exercise of those functions and powers, but may not prevent the Authority from performing a function it is required to perform or otherwise complying with this or any Act.

In addition to the Annual Report (Section 32E Annual Report)(Section 32E), its tabling in Parlkiament (Section 32F Tabling of annual report) the Board of the Authority is required to prepare quarterly report for the first three quarters of the financial year (Section 32G).
