= William J. Lines =

Australian author

William J. Lines is an Australian author with a focus on the environment and environmental politics.

Lines has written about the Western Australian botanist Georgiana Molloy, and about walking the Bibbulmun Track. He has written about environmental change in Australia.

He has also looked at the politics and dynamics of environmentalists and environmental groups. Lines' history of The Wilderness Society (Australia) is a study of the interpersonal politics that beset any volunteer organization over time, with a focus upon former director Alec Marr.

Of his published works, Taming the Great South Land has elicited the most extended discussion and reviews to date.

== Works ==
=== Books ===
- Lines, William J (September 2019), Failing nature : the rise and fall of The Wilderness Society, Envirobook, a division of Trekaway Pty. Ltd (published 2019), ISBN 978-0-85881-255-0
- Lines, William J (2006), Patriots : defending Australia's natural heritage, University of Queensland Press, ISBN 978-0-7022-3554-2
- Lines, William J (2001), Open air : essays, New Holland, ISBN 978-1-876334-75-8
- Lines, William J (1998), A long walk in the Australian bush, UNSW Press, ISBN 978-0-86840-616-9
- Lines, William J (1998), False economy : Australia in the Twentieth Century, Fremantle Arts Centre Press, ISBN 978-1-86368-209-1
- Lines, William J (1994), An all consuming passion : origins, modernity, and the Australian life of Georgiana Molloy, Allen & Unwin, ISBN 978-1-86373-553-7
- Lines, William J (January 1991), Taming the great south land : a history of the conquest of nature in Australia, University of California Press (published 1991), ISBN 978-0-520-07830-7

=== Articles ===
- Lines, William J (1 October 1999), "Science in the Service of Empire: Joseph Banks, the British State and the Uses of Science in the Age of Revolution.(Review)", Australian Historical Studies, 30 (113), University of Melbourne, Department of History: 356(2), ISSN 1031-461X
