= Private Forests Tasmania =

Statutory authority overview
- Jurisdiction: Tasmania, Australia
- Headquarters: Hobart, Tasmania
- Employees: 7.2 FTE (2023)
- Annual budget: $2.279 million (2023)
- Minister responsible: Minister for Resources
- Statutory authority executive: Elizabeth Pietrzykowski, Chief Executive Officer
- Parent department: Building Tasmania
- Key document: Private Forests Act (1994)
- Website: www.pft.tas.gov.au

Private Forests Tasmania is a Tasmanian government statutory authority established in 1994 by the Tasmanian Private Forests Act 1994. The Authority was created to provide assistance and advice on private forest management in Tasmania, Australia. The objectives of the authority are to facilitate and expand the development of the private forest resource in Tasmania, in a manner that is consistent with sound forest land management practices.

Private Forest Tasmania is the only Australian government funded body established to specifically promote, foster and assist private landowners to manage sustainably their native forests and encourage the expansion of plantation estate.

== Governance and funding ==
Private Forests Tasmania has a Board of Directors which includes people with experience in commerce, economic development, industrial private forestry, non-industrial growers (two farm foresters), or forest science or related activities, and includes a Chief Executive Officer (CEO). The CEO provides advice to the Tasmanian Minister for Forestry on private forest matters.

The Part 19A of the Private Forests Act provides that a Ministerial Charter to the agency outlining the broad policy expectations and limit the functions and powers of the agency and requires that the Board conduct business and affairs in a manner consistent with the charter. The current charter is dated January 2020.

Costs and expenses, incurred in performing selected functions are funded by money provided by the Tasmanian Parliament.

A private forest service levy was introduced in August 2001 to fund other activities the Authority. As of 2015, it is set at $15 per hectare, based on the net area of land being harvested or afforested area, in a certified forest practices plan under the Tasmania Forest Practices Act 1985.

== History ==
Prior to 1994, the Private Forestry Division of the Tasmanian Forestry Commission, provided support to private forest owners. The Private Forestry Division was established after an amendment to the Forestry Act in 1977, for the express purpose of encouraging the establishment and sound management of forests on farms and other private land. The 1977 amendment to Forestry Act also created the Private Forestry Council.

These amendments were a recommendation of the 1977 Board of Inquiry into Private Forest Development in Tasmania.

Tasmania has a high proportion of privately owned forests, about 30 percent by area, which was formally recognized by the government when the Private Forests Council was established in 1978. The Council advised the Government on private forestry matters.

The Private Forestry Division provided financial incentives, as grants and loans, for the establishment and tending of commercial plantations of pine, eucalyptus and special timber species, notably blackwood (Acacia melanoxylon).

Upon the corporatisation of the Forestry Commission in 1995, the Private Forestry Division was reconstituted as a Tasmanian government statutory authority, Private Forests Tasmania (PFT), under a new Private Forestry Act 1994. Forestry Tasmania, trading as Sustainable Timber Tasmania, a state-owned company to manage forests on State forests, and a statutory authority, Forest Practices Authority, to regulate forest practices were also established at this time.

The government authority, Private Forests Tasmania, provides advice on, and assistance to private forest owners.

== Activities ==
Extension services are provided to individuals or groups of individuals, who own land, plantations or native forest; and wish to establish plantation on cleared land, management plantation or manage their native forests.

Private Forests Tasmania employs foresters to service all regions of the State, as well as staff supporting land care, agroforestry and forest practices programs. The agency has close working relations with field operatives of the Department of Primary Industries, Parks Water and Environment, State Forest manager Forestry Tasmania, and the major private forestry companies. Private Forests Tasmania had working links with the State farmer association, the Tasmanian Farmers and Graziers Association. The agency works with a range of other National, State and local government agencies that also play a role in farm forestry, forestry and environmental issues.

In recent years Private Forests Tasmanian has created Tree Alliance, a strategic program 'to grow our future economy and ecology through trees'. The Alliance currently has 14 Partners.

== See also ==
- Sustainable Timber Tasmania - the government business enterprise that manages public production forest in Tasmania
