= Munda Biddi Trail =

Long-distance cycling trail in Western Australia

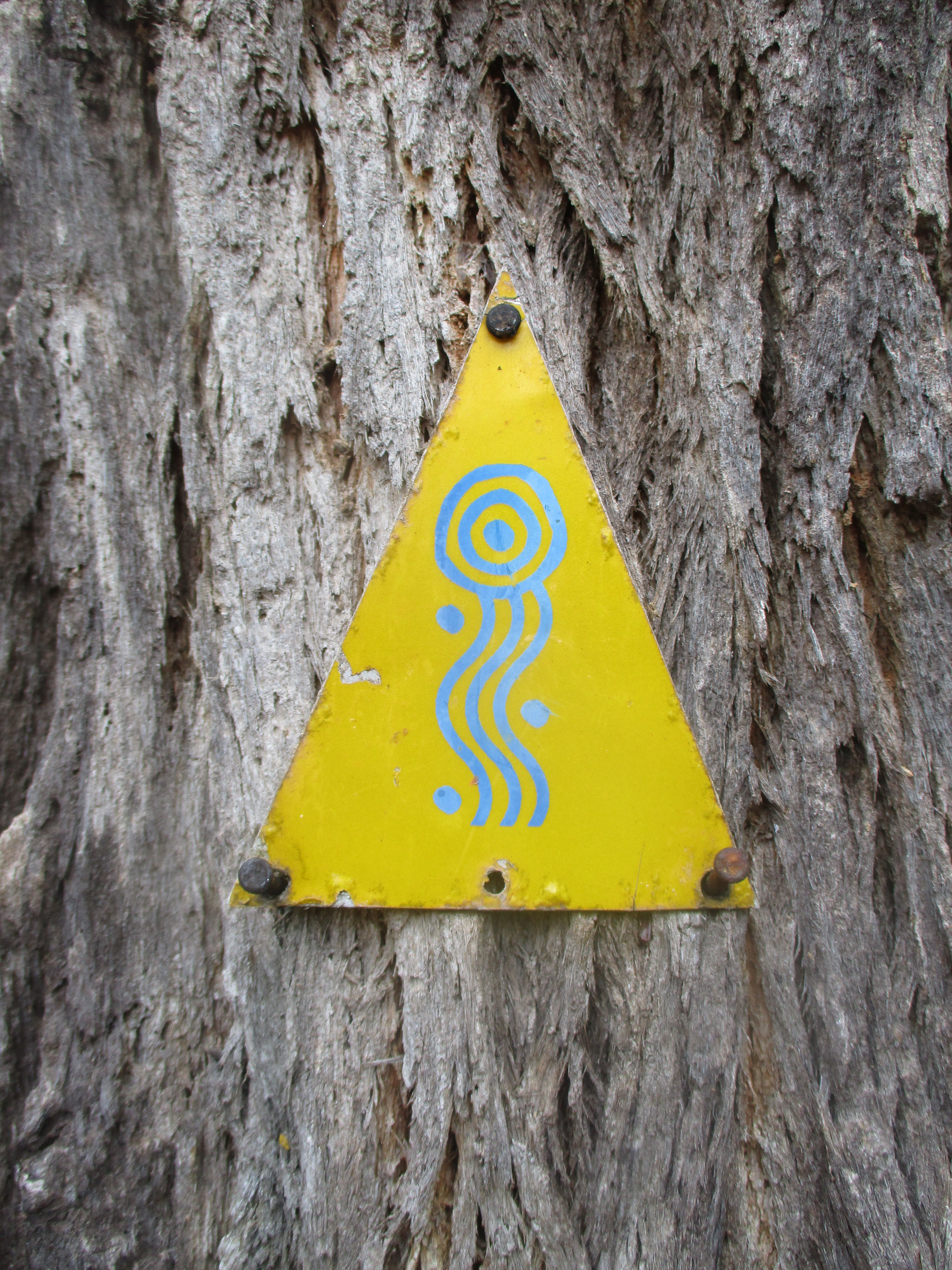
- Trail marker
- Length: Over 1,000 km (620 mi)
- Location: Southwestern Western Australia, Australia
- Completed: April 2013
- Designation: Long-Distance Cycling Trail
- Trailheads: Mundaring (northern terminus), Albany (southern terminus)
- Use: Cycling
- Difficulty: Grade 4
- Season: All year, but spring is best
- Waymark: Blue triangular marker
- Hazards: Summer heat, Fire danger
- Right of way: Cyclist
- Maintainer: Parks and Wildlife Service at the Department of Biodiversity, Conservation and Attractions, Munda Biddi Trail Foundation
- Website: parks.dpaw.wa.gov.au/know/munda-biddi-trail

Trail map
- The Munda Biddi Trail, shown in red, is a long-distance cycling trail between Perth and Albany. Also shown, in yellow, is the Bibbulmun Track.

The Munda Biddi Trail is a long-distance mostly off-road cycling trail in Western Australia. It runs for over 1,000 kilometres (620 mi) from Mundaring to Albany. The completed Munda Biddi Trail opened end-to-end in April 2013 when it claimed the title of the longest continuous off-road cycling trail of its kind in the world.

Sections of the trail vary in terms of their difficulty and terrain type but it has stages suitable for everyone's cycling ability and pace. The trail is easily accessible by car, and riders can begin their journey from multiple locations. There are free campsites at various points along the trail, some with more than a day's ride between them. Detailed maps of the trail are available.

In April 2012, geocaches were placed throughout the Munda Biddi Trail.

== Etymology ==
The name Munda Biddi means 'path through the forest' in the Noongar Aboriginal language, and it runs largely through an undeveloped natural corridor. The track traverses vast areas of unspoiled forests and bushland with mostly gentle terrain. While the track is open year-round as of May 2017, riding conditions are better during spring and autumn, and potentially hazardous from December to March because of the often extreme heat and fire danger at that time of year.

== Records ==
The record for completing the Munda Biddi Trail is two days, twelve hours and 15 minutes, set by Jack Thompson in November 2023. The female record for completing the Munda Biddi Trail (north to south) was set by Mikayla Smith in October 2026, in three days and ten hours.

The previous records were:

- Craig Wiggins – 2 days, 17 hours and 22 minutes, set on 25 October 2020
- Callum Henderson – 3 days, 16 hours and 17 minutes, set on 6 October 2020
- Declan von Dietze – 4 days, 6 hours and 39 minutes, set in 2017.

== Foundation ==
The trail is run by the Munda Biddi Trail Foundation, a not-for-profit organisation which was formed to assist the Department of Biodiversity, Conservation and Attractions and other land managers get the trail project off the ground. The foundation continues to be involved in trail development and planning, including managing volunteers, delivering events and trip planning, among other activities.

== Stages and Maps ==
Stage 1 – Mundaring to Collie

- Map 1. Mundaring to Jarrahdale
- Map 2. Jarrahdale to Nanga
- Map 3. Nanga to Collie

Stage 2 – Collie to Northcliffe

- Map 4. Collie to Jarrahwood
- Map 5. Jarrahwood to Manjimup
- Map 6. Manjimup – Northcliffe

Stage 3 – Northcliffe to Albany

- Map 7. Northcliffe – Walpole
- Map 8. Walpole – Denmark
- Map 9. Denmark – Albany

== Gallery ==
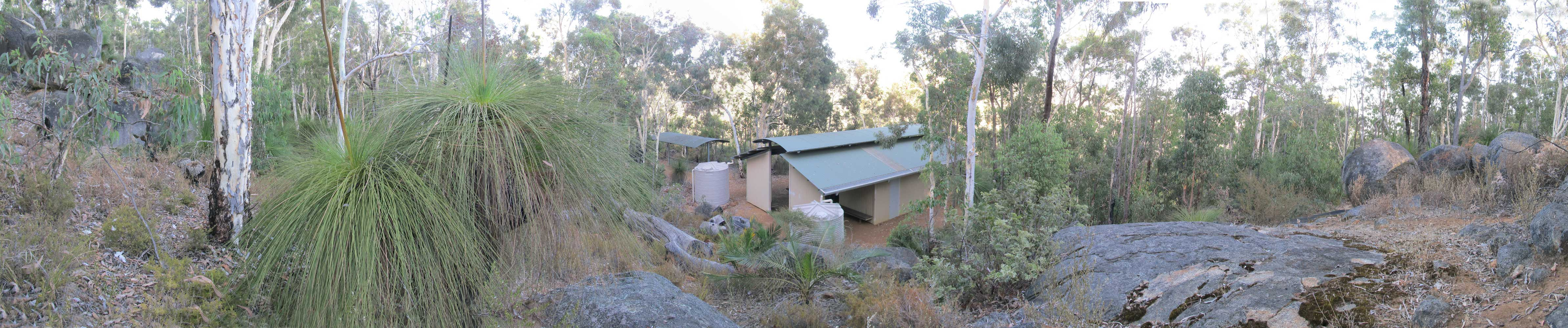
Dandalup Campsite near North Dandalup Dam east of North Dandalup

Southern terminus in Albany, April 2022

== See also ==
- Bibbulmun Track
- Long-distance trails in Australia
