= Robert Morris-Nunn =

Australian architect (born 1949)

Robert Morris-Nunn, AM
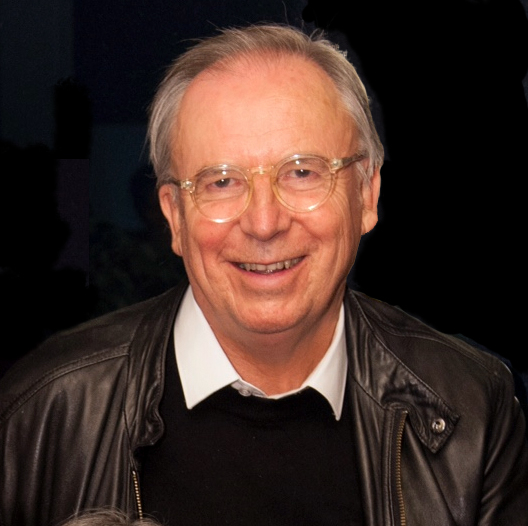
- Robert-Morris Nunn, 2017
- Born: 23 September 1949 (age 77); Newcastle, New South Wales
- Education: University of Sydney
- Occupation: Architect
- Practice: Circa Morris Nunn
- Website: www.circamorrisnunn.com.au

Robert William Morris-Nunn AM (born 23 September 1949) is an Australian architect.

He has practised in Tasmania for over 30 years, during which time he has won over 50 state and national awards.

== Early life and practice ==
Born in Newcastle, New South Wales, Morris-Nunn studied architecture at the University of Sydney. His name until at least his twenties was Robert Arthur Nunn. The importation of "William Morris" and the dropping of his father's given name, Arthur must have occurred after he reached his twenties.

From 1979 to 1984 he was principal designer for Glenn Smith Associates in Launceston. During this time he explored Tasmania's heritage buildings, including Australia's richest collection of Georgian buildings. He has been involved in many heritage projects since, often in collaboration with artists and craftspeople. He has consulted to the National Trust of Australia (Tasmania) and the Tasmanian Heritage Commission on the classification of buildings from both the 19th and 20th centuries.

== Private practice ==
In 1984 Morris-Nunn began his independent private practice in Launceston, before moving, in 1993, to Hobart, where he has been since.

== Education ==
After graduating from the University of Sydney in 1972 and moving to Tasmania, Morris-Nunn began lecturing part-time in design at the University of Tasmania (UTAS) alongside his professional practice. In 2006 he completed a Master of Architecture (by invitation) from the Royal Melbourne Institute of Technology (RMIT). He continues to lecture at UTAS, and was an adjunct professor in the School of Architecture and Design from 2009–2013.

== Awards ==
In the Australia Day Honours, 2017, Morris-Nunn was made a Member of the Order of Australia (AM) for significant service to commercial architecture in Tasmania, to tertiary education, to professional institutes, and as a role model.

In 2010 Robert Morris-Nunn was awarded the President's Prize (Tasmania), seen as a Lifetime Achievement Award, by the Australian Institute of Architects.

His firm, MN+ A (now Circa Morris Nunn Chua), has received more design awards than any other individual or architectural practice in Tasmania, both historically and currently.

== List of Notable Works ==
All of Morris-Nunn's works are in Tasmania, Australia. From restored and reimagined heritage building including the Henry Jones Art Hotel and IXL buildings, Macquarie Wharf Number 2 Shed, Princes Wharf Number 1 Shed to new builds including Mac 01, Morris-Nunn has played a major in shaping the waterfront area of Tasmania's capital city, Hobart.

The floating building Brooke Street Pier, was the first of its kind in Australia. It includes the ferry terminal to the art museum, Museum of Old and New Art (Mona).

=== Completed ===
2024 Hobart Penitentiary, Unshackled, Convict immersive experience.

2021 Moss 25 Boutique Hotel, Salamanca Place

2019 Moss 39, Boutique Hotel, Salamanca Place, Hobart.

2017 Mac 01, Hunter St, Hobart

2015 Brooke Street Pier, Hobart

2013 Macquarie Wharf Number 2 Shed, Hobart

2011 Princes Wharf Number 1 Shed, Hobart

2010 Saffire Resort, Coles Bay

2006 Islington Hotel, South Hobart

2005 Henry Jones Art Hotel and IXL Redevelopment, Hobart

2002 Forest Eco Centre, Scottsdale

1997 Forestry Tasmania Headquarters, Hobart

1997 Corumbene, New Norfolk

1993 Strahan Visitors Centre, Strahan

1987 Bungawitta Child Care Centre, Newnham

1983 Woolmers Coachman's Cottage, Longford

=== Proposed or under construction ===
2014 Macquarie Wharf Number 1, Hobart

2015 The Springs Resort and Visitors Centre, Mt Wellington

2015 Recherche Bay Resort, Recherche Bay

2015 Detached Art Tower, Hobart

2015 Rosny Hill Sanctuary, Rosny
