= Alec Marr =

Australian conservationist

Alec Marr is an Australian conservationist and former executive director of the Wilderness Society (TWS) in Australia from 1998 to 2010. He has been a forest campaigner, lobbyist and international campaign advisor.

== Farmhouse Creek and Tasmanian wilderness activism ==
In 1986 Marr joined forest campaigners at the Hobart office of the Wilderness Society where he began organising a forest blockade at Farmhouse Creek in Tasmania's south-west. In February 1986 he climbed 20 metres to a tree sit and stayed there for 16 days. The Farmhouse Creek protest became front-page news across Australia.

In 1989 he and fellow Wilderness Society campaigner Geoff Law negotiated the Salamanca Agreement. The Labor-Green Accord negotiations led to an increase in Tasmania's World Heritage estate from 235,000 to 550,000 hectares. Further negotiations with the federal government extended the protected area to 600,000 hectares.

In 1992 Marr led the direct action that stopped limestone mining at Exit Cave in Tasmania's southwest, which at the time was the longest known cave in Australia. Subsequently, he became The Wilderness Society's spokesperson for the Long Hot Summer forest campaign of 1992–93.

As TWS's national lobbyist from 1994, Marr negotiated with the Keating and Howard governments over wood chipping.

== Jabiluka Uranium Mine ==
In March 1998 Marr was among the first to be arrested at what proved to be a several-months long, but ultimately successful, protest against uranium mining at Jabiluka in the Northern Territory. After his arrest Marr joined traditional owners in lobbying the World Heritage Committee to stop uranium mining inside the World Heritage-listed Kakadu National Park, at Jabiluka. The campaign to stop Uranium Mining was ultimately successful after Marr and Leanne Minshull led the Wilderness Society's corporate activism against the mining company, North Limited, significantly reducing the company's share price.

== Growth of the Wilderness Society ==
In May 1998 Marr became executive director of The Wilderness Society.

Meanwhile, TWS kept growing. When Marr became director the Society was virtually bankrupt with an annual turn-over of less than $1 million. Ten years later, by 2008, the Society had a budget of $15 million with a membership of 45,000. One hundred and fifty employees worked across the country. Paid campaign teams operated in every state.

== Gunns Ltd & Ors v Marr & Ors ==
Marr steered the Wilderness Society on a corporate campaign against Gunns, the country's largest timber company and one of the world's largest exporters of woodchips. The Society took the issue to Gunns' customers in Japan and the company's financial backers.

However, Marr's leadership in the campaign against Gunns resulted in two separate writs brought in the Supreme Court of Victoria. Marr was named as the lead defendant among 14 others in a claim alleging interference in the practices of Gunns Ltd in six separate incidents. The case was recognised as Australia's biggest strategic lawsuit against public participation at the time. When finally settled in 2010 the case was reported to have cost Gunns Ltd $2.8 million including $1.3 million paid to the Wilderness Society.

== Departure from the Wilderness Society ==
A consultant's audit commissioned by Marr in 2008 had reported there was "a combative approach by managers" and lack of transparency in the matter of pay structures, including commissions, bonuses, and perceived perks.

By the end of 2009 Lyndon Schnieders had failed in his bid to become appointed as the Wilderness Society's National Campaigns Director after an international applicant was chosen for the position. Imminently following the staffing decision, Marr claimed he was in a power struggle with Schnieders and chaos enveloped the Society. Several staff members allied to Schnieders began expressing no confidence in Marr's leadership. Marr convened an annual general meeting in November 2009 known to only the governing National Management Committee. At the meeting, the Society's constitution was changed to ensure 10% of the membership was required to call for an extraordinary general meeting, and not 20 which had been the previous requirement.

A 2010 ruling by the Tasmanian Supreme Court found that the AGM held in November 2009 by Marr was not legitimate. Following the ruling, several of the Society's staff, led by Lyndon Schneiders, were easily able to garner the 20 members required to call an extraordinary general meeting to oust Marr and the National Management Committee of the Society. In September 2010, Marr's resignation was forced by an extraordinary general meeting of the Wilderness Society held in Adelaide. At the time, Marr claimed there was a conspiracy to remove him and alleged 'cronyism' within the organisation.

Within several weeks of Marr's departure from the Wilderness Society, Lyndon Schneiders became National Director, disbanding both the Wild Country and Climate Change programs established under the leadership of Marr.

== Triabunna Woodchip Mill controversy ==
In his final months at the Wilderness Society, Marr and fellow campaigners had conceived the idea of buying Gunns' controversial Triabunna Woodchip Mill on the east coast of Tasmania, at the time it was the largest woodchip mill in the southern hemisphere.

Marr found buyers in Wotif founder Graeme Wood and Kathmandu founder Jan Cameron. Negotiating on their behalf, Marr convinced the new management at Gunns to sell to Wood and Cameron, who purchased the mill for around $10 million. In July 2011 Marr was appointed general manager of the woodchip mill. In July 2014 Tasmanian media published a refutation by Marr of accusations that he had been installed with the express intention of sabotaging the plant as reported in an article in the Monthly.

== World Heritage ==
In 2014 Marr was present at the 38th session of the World Heritage Committee in Doha, Qatar on the occasion of the hearing into the proposal to remove 74,000 ha from Tasmania's World Heritage Area. At the meeting, Marr and other conservationists successfully worked with State Parties on the World Heritage Committee to stop the World Heritage revocations of Tasmania forests.

In 2019 Marr became a strategic adviser to the NSW based Wilderness Australia. Marr's work centres around lobbying of the UNESCO World Heritage Committee on the proposed raising of the Warragamba Dam wall.
