= Bibbulmun Track =

Long-distance walk trail in Western Australia

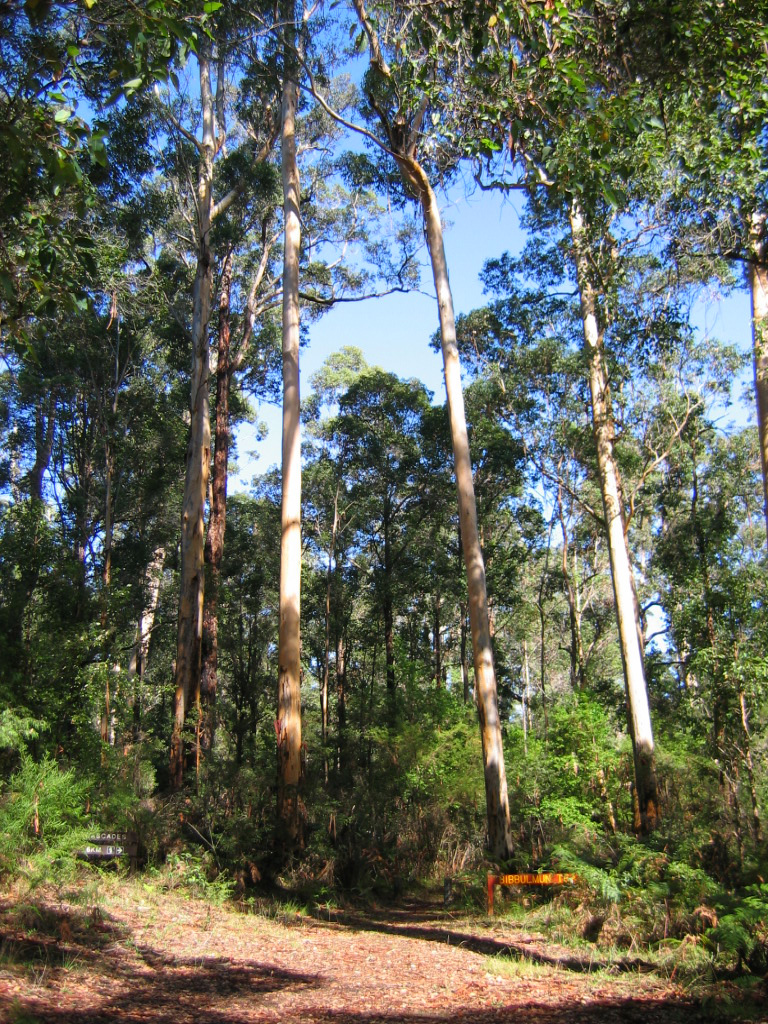
- Bibbulmun Track through karri forest near Pemberton, Western Australia.
- Length: 1,003.1 km (623.3 mi)
- Location: Southwestern Western Australia, Australia
- Established: 1972
- Began construction: 1979
- Completed: 1998
- Designation: Long-Distance Walk Trail
- Trailheads: Kalamunda (northern terminus), Albany (southern terminus)
- Use: Hiking
- Difficulty: Grade 4
- Season: All year, but spring is best
- Waymark: Bright yellow Wagyl trail marker
- Hazards: Summer heat, Fire danger
- Right of way: Pedestrian
- Maintainer: Parks and Wildlife Service at the Department of Biodiversity, Conservation and Attractions, Bibbulmun Track Foundation
- Website: parks.dpaw.wa.gov.au/know/bibbulmun-track

Trail map
- The Bibbulmun Track, shown in red, is a long-distance walking trail between Perth and Albany. Also shown, in yellow, is the Munda Biddi Trail.

Designations

Western Australia Heritage Register
- Official name: Bibbulmun Track
- Type: State Register
- Designated: 8 Aug 2025
- Reference no.: 27521

The Bibbulmun Track (known colloquially as the Bibb) is a long-distance walk trail in Western Australia. It runs from Kalamunda in the east of Perth to Albany, and is 1,003.1 kilometres (623.3 mi) long. Managed by government agencies and with a foundation, the Bibbulmun Track traverses the Darling Range and has inspired reflections about the state of the Western Australian environment by William J. Lines in his book A long walk in the Australian bush.

The name comes from the Bibbulmun group of Noongar people, Indigenous Australians from the south-west area of Western Australia.

== History ==
The route has been changed twice, partly due to it passing through a significant section of forest that was at risk to change from forestry, bauxite mining or dieback.

The track was suggested in 1972. The groups that had suggested and also who were involved in planning with the then Forests Department of Western Australia were:

- Perth Bushwalkers
- Western Walking Club
- Youth Hostels Association
- Scout Association of Australia (W.A. Division)
- The Speleological Research Group of W.A.

The track was first opened in 1979 but the third and final alignment and extension through to Albany was opened in 1998 and retains less than 10% of earlier alignments.

The Bibbulmun Track is a walker-only trail. No wheeled vehicles of any kind are permitted. It has a parallel long-distance cycling trail – known as the Munda Biddi Trail – that opened all the way to Albany in April 2013. This trail is generally situated to the west of the Bibbulmun Track.

== Gallery ==
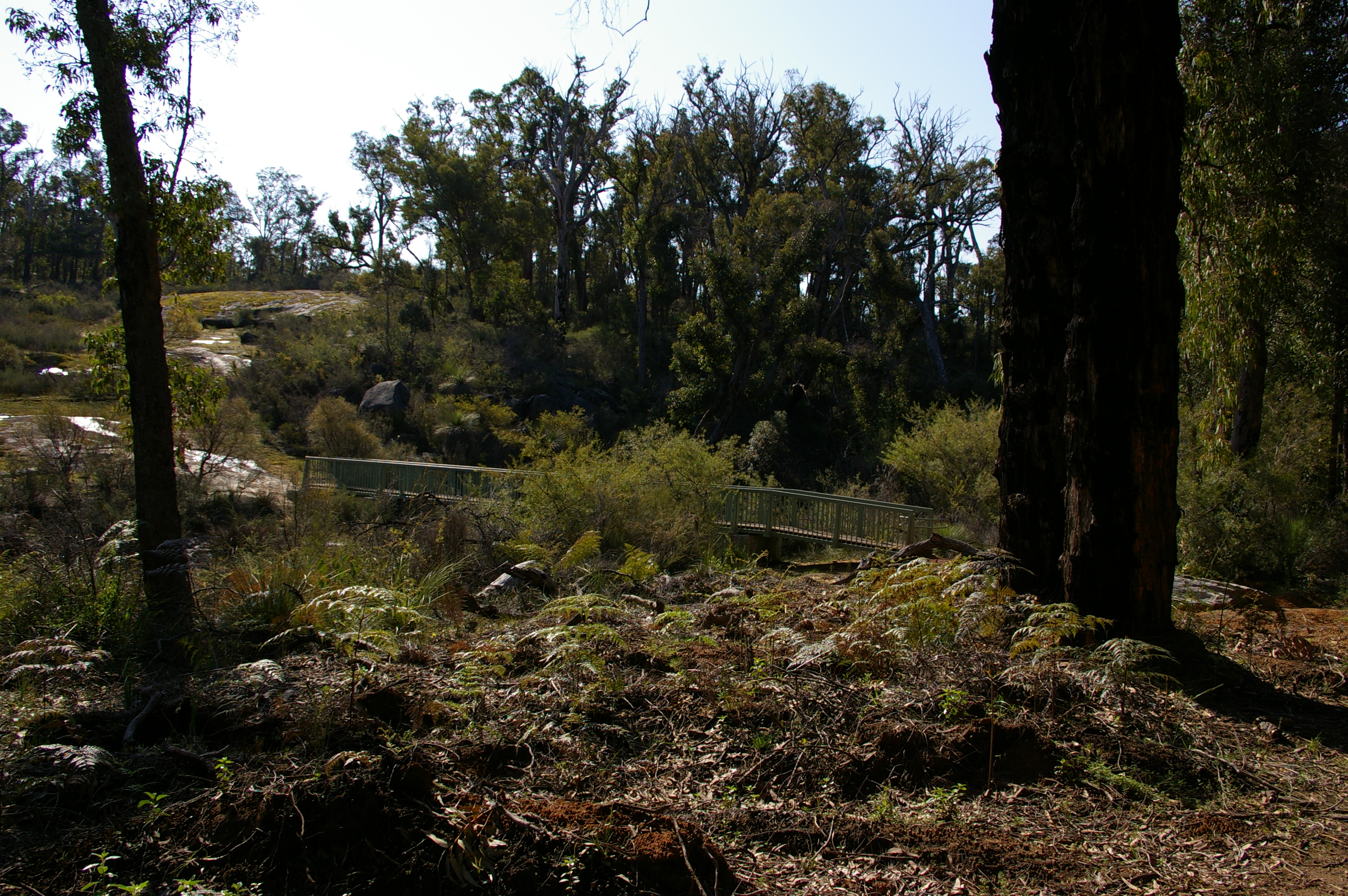
Crossing upper reaches of Canning River

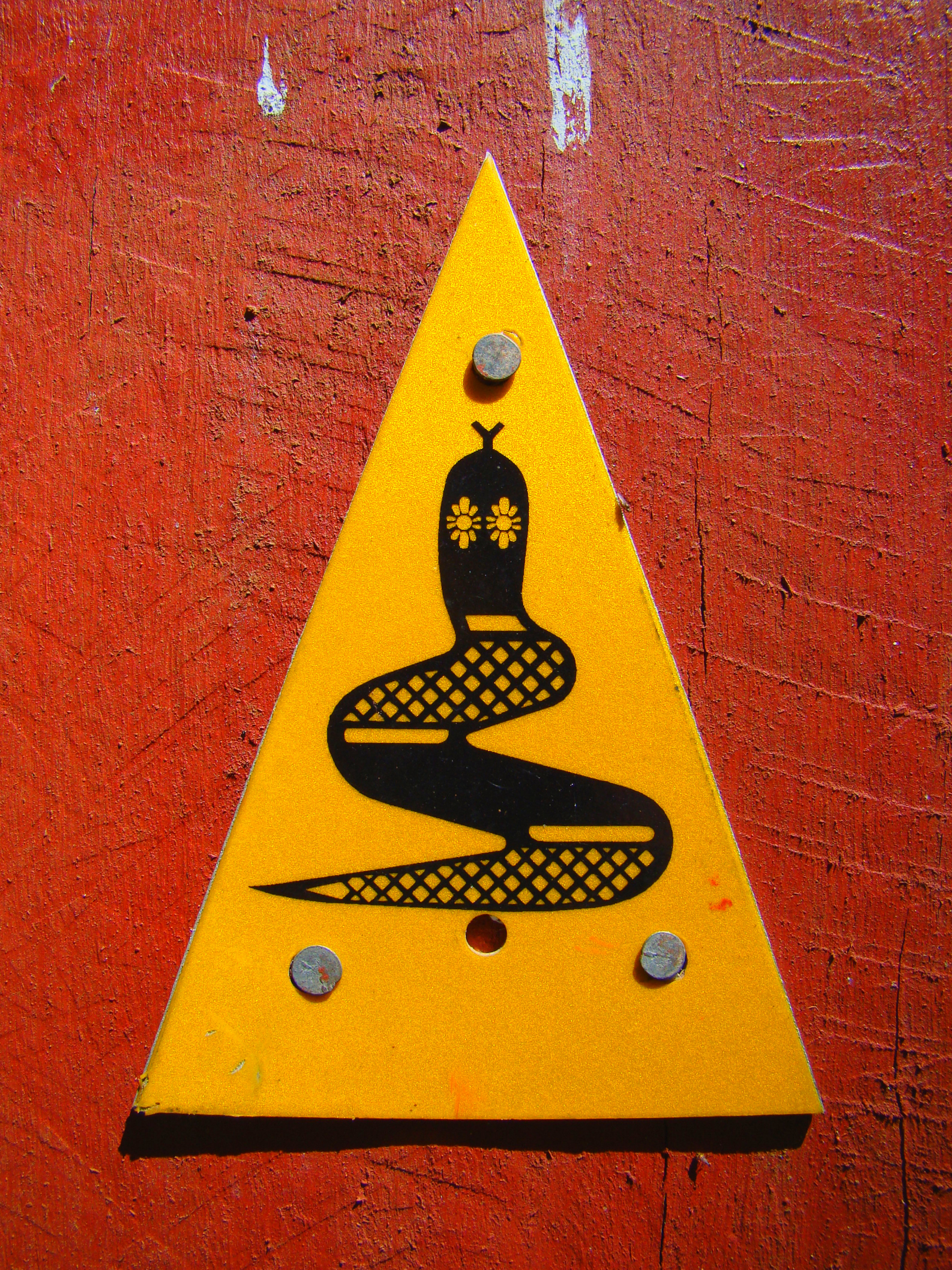
The bright yellow track marker features a symbol of the Wagyl

Track to beach at Conspicuous Cliff in Walpole-Nornalup National Park, between Walpole and Peaceful Bay

Track in Valley of the Giants near Walpole

== Track sections ==
The track consists of 58 sections and is marked at regular intervals with triangular signs, most of which have a symbol of the Wagyl. The Wagyl, or Rainbow Serpent, is a snakelike Dreamtime creature that is a common deity in Noongar culture. Each section is approximately one day's walk, except for the northernmost 150 kilometres (93 mi) or so, where the sections consist of half-day walks. At the end of each section is either a town or a purpose-built campsite. Each campsite consists of a three-sided shelter with wooden sleeping platforms, a water tank, a pit toilet, picnic tables and cleared tent sites. In the northern half, most campsites also have a barbecue pit and plate (open fires are banned in the southern section).

The Bibbulmun Track is almost all through state forest, national parks and other reserves, with only a few small sections of farmland. The first half of the track is through the jarrah forests of the Darling Range. It then moves through flatter tall karri forests until reaching the coastline near the town of Walpole. The remainder of the track is through coastal forest and scrub along the south coast, in some sections routed along sandy beaches.

The towns the track passes through are Dwellingup, Collie, Balingup, Donnelly River Village, Pemberton, Northcliffe, Walpole and Denmark.

Highlights of the track include:

- Mundaring Weir
- Monadnocks area and Mount Cooke
- Murray River Valley
- Karri forests between Donnelly River and Denmark
- Tingle forest near Walpole
- Coastal scenery along the south coast
- Wildflower displays, birdlife and other Southwest Australian flora and fauna.
- Marine mammals along the south coast such as seals, dolphins and whales

The Bibbulmun Track is managed by the Western Australian Parks and Wildlife Service at the Department of Biodiversity, Conservation and Attractions and The Bibbulmun Track Foundation – an incorporated not-for-profit community-based organisation established to provide support for the department in the management, maintenance and marketing of the track to ensure that it remains a "long-distance walk trail of international significance and quality". The foundation sells maps and guide books, offers trip planning advice, offers equipment hire and runs courses on camp cooking and navigation.

The track can have temporary route changes or diversions due to maintenance, impassable inlet crossings or other issues as well as permanent realignments that occur from time to time.

Most people choose to walk sections of the track for one or a few days at a time. Hardy walkers who walk the track from beginning to end typically do so in 6 to 8 weeks, although the record stands at under 9 days. The most popular time to walk the track is during the wildflower season of spring (September – November), going from north to south as the wildflower season starts later in the southern areas. In summer the weather can be very hot and water will be hard to find except in the water tanks at the campsites. Winter can be wet, especially in the southern areas but people walk the track any time from March to December.

== Track maps ==
| Map | Last updated | Reference |
|---|---|---|
| Map 1 – Darling Range – Kalamunda to North Bannister | January 2004 | ISBN 0-7309-6064-1 |
| Map 2 – Dwellingup – North Bannister to Harvey-Quindanning Road | December 2004 | ISBN 0-7309-6072-2 |
| Map 3 – Collie – Harvey-Quindanning Road to Mumballup | June 2006 | ISBN 0-7309-6080-3 |
| Map 4 – Blackwood – Mumballup to Brockman Highway | January 2006 | ISBN 0-7309-6088-9 |
| Map 5 – Pemberton – Brockman Highway to Middleton Road | December 2003 | ISBN 0-7309-6059-5 |
| Map 6 – Northcliffe – Middleton Road to Broke Inlet Road | December 2003 | ISBN 0-7309-6067-6 |
| Map 7 – Walpole – Broke Inlet Road to William Bay | December 2003 | ISBN 0-7309-6075-7 |
| Map 8 – Denmark/Albany – William Bay to Albany | December 2003 | ISBN 0-7309-6083-8 |

== Awards ==
- 2003: Finalist – Major Tourist Attractions – Western Australian Tourism Awards
- 2003: Sport and Recreation Industry Awards
- 2004: Winner – Significant Tourist Attraction – Western Australian Tourism Awards
- 2005: Finalist – Significant Tourist Attraction – Western Australian Tourism Awards
- 2006: Winner – Significant Tourist Attraction – Western Australian Tourism Awards
- 2006: Highly Commended – Significant Tourist Attraction – Australian Tourism Awards

== See also ==
- Cape to Cape Track
- Long-distance trails
- Munda Biddi Trail
- Backpacking
- Warlu Way

== General references ==
- Guide to the Bibbulmun Bushwalking Track. Perth: Forests Department Western Australia. August 1979.
- Keating, Annie; Shrimpton, Becky (1999). A Dream Realised – the Bibbulmun Track. Western Australian State Trails Conference. pp. 68–76.
- Bonnin, Mylene, ed. (2004). Bibbulmun Track Accommodation and Services – a Walkers Guide. Perth: Bibbulmun Track Foundation and CALM.

== Sources ==
- Bartlett, Tom; Wait, Maddie (2024). "Bibbulmun Track Trip Report". The Adventure Gene.
- "The Track". Bibbulmun Track Foundation. 2026a.
- "About the Foundation". Bibbulmun Track Foundation. 2026b.
- "Track Conditions". Bibbulmun Track Foundation. 2026c.
- Lines, William J. (1998). A long walk in the Australian bush. UNSW Press. ISBN 978-0-86840-616-9.
- "Bibbulmun Track". Parks and Wildlife Service. 2017.
- Pontin, Louise (25 January 2017). "An Adventurers Guide to the Bibbulmun Track". Women Want Adventure.
- Shaw, Stan; Cook, Paul; Murphy, Rosemary (8 October 2025). "WA's Bibbulmun Track Running Record Broken Twice in One Week". ABC News.
- Sertis, Steve; Clark, Steve (16 January 2014). "Bibbulmun Track reaches 1000 km". Bibbulmun Track Foundation.
- "Spirituality: The Waugal or Great Serpent-like Dreamtime Spirit". South West Aboriginal Land and Sea Council. 2018.
- Thannoo, Jamie (17 September 2023). "Walkers Celebrate 1,000km Bibbulmun Track's 25th Anniversary in Western Australia". ABC News.
- "Bibbulmun Track, Kalamunda to Albany". Trails WA. 2026.
- Tyrrell, Claire (25 April 2018). "WA runner Shane Johnstone breaks Bibbulmun Track record with 1000 km in under 12 days". The West Australian.
