= Sustainable Timber Tasmania =

Government of Tasmania owned enterprise

- Map of the production forest managed by Sustainable Timber Tasmania
- Formerly: Forestry Tasmania
- Company type: Government-owned corporation
- Industry: Forestry
- Founded: 1994
- Founder: Government of Tasmania
- Headquarters: Forestry Building, Hobart, Australia
- Area served: Tasmania
- Key people: Steve Whiteley (Chief Executive Officer); Rob de Fégely (Chairman)
- Production output: ▼1,201,760 (measurement of m^{3} and tonnes of wood) (2023)
- Revenue: ▲ A$133.1 million (2023)
- Net income: ▼ A$7.54 million (2023)
- Total assets: ▲ A$314.7 million (2023)
- Total equity: ▲ A$220.4 million (2023)
- Owner: Government of Tasmania
- Number of employees: ▲169 (2023)
- Website: https://www.sttas.com.au/

Sustainable Timber Tasmania, formerly Forestry Tasmania, is a government business enterprise owned by the Government of Tasmania, Australia. It is responsible for the management of public production forest in Tasmania, which is about 800,000 hectares of crown land (public land) that is classified as 'permanent timber production zone'.

It was established in 1994, although it has earlier historical origins from operations undertaken by the state government. Sustainable Timber Tasmania is overseen by a Board of Management who are responsible to the Treasurer and the Minister for Forests.

== History ==
The passing of the State Forests Act 1885 marked the beginning of regular reporting of forest management activities in Tasmania, conducted by Lands and Surveys Department until the formation of the Forestry Department in 1921. Research activities in the 1920s were mainly directed at assessing and mapping the State's commercial timber resources. Ground mapping was eventually replaced in the 1930s and 1940s by vastly more efficient aerial mapping. As forestry resource modelling become increasingly sophisticated, the Forestry Department was replaced by the Forestry Commission in 1947 and the research effort in all subject areas accelerated. The advent of the woodchip export industry in the 1970s gave rise to broad scale pulpwood harvesting. With a strengthened commercial focus, Forestry Tasmania was established in 1994, becoming a corporation under the Government Business Enterprises Act 1995.

In 1994, Forestry Tasmania moved into the Forestry Building, Hobart.

=== Rebranding and downsizing ===
Following the release of the 2015/16 annual report and a loss of $67 million, the state government announced plans for the rebranding and restructuring of Forestry Tasmania. Changes include a downsizing and rebranding of the company to trade under the name of Sustainable Timber Tasmania, charging more for harvested timber, logging areas earmarked for reserves and for the government to pay more for forestry roads which have multiple uses.

Former Forestry Tasmania logo

Sustainable Timber Tasmania was established on 1 July 2017. A few months later it was announced that 29,000 hectares of hardwood forest plantations were to be sold for $60.7 million to Reliance Forest Fibre with a 99-year lease on the land.

== Permanent timber production zone land ==
'Permanent timber production zone land' (PTPZ or PTPZL) is crown land managed by Sustainable Timber Tasmania as defined in the Forest Management Act 2013. Crown land may be classified as PTPZ (or have PTPZ classification revoked) pursuant of approval by both Houses of Parliament. PTPZ land is primarily for the purposes of wood production; specifically, activities undertaken include native forest harvesting/reforestation, plantation harvesting, road and quarry construction.

=== Access ===
'Permanent timber production zone land' is accessible to the public and normal road rules apply on the Forestry Tasmania managed roads. Roads may be closed for safety or forest operations. Camping is generally allowed except when signed 'no camping'.

=== Protected areas ===
A portion of the land managed by Sustainable Timber Tasmania has informal reserve status to protect habitat for threatened species, provide streamside protection, public recreation, etc.

== See also ==
- Private Forests Tasmania - the statutory authority that provides assistance and advice on private forest management in Tasmania
- Forestry in Tasmania
