= Gunns =

Defunct Australian timber company

Gunns Limited
- Type: Public company
- Traded as: ASX: GNS
- Industry: Timber production
- Founded: 1875
- Founder: John and Thomas Gunn
- Defunct: March 2013
- Headquarters: Launceston, Tasmania, Australia
- Key people: John Gay (former CEO); Chris Newman (Chairman)
- Revenue: ▼A$406 million (2012)
- Net income: ▼A$904 million (2012)
- Number of employees: 645 (2012)
- Divisions: Gunns Plantations Limited; Gunns Forestry Limited; Tamar Ridge Wines; Gunns Retail; Gunns Timber Products; Gunns Pulp
- Website: www.gunns.com.au

Gunns Limited was a major forestry enterprise located in Tasmania, Australia. It had operations in forest management, woodchipping, sawmilling and veneer production. The company was placed into liquidation in March 2013.

== History ==
Founded in 1875 by brothers John and Thomas Gunn, it was one of Australia's oldest companies. It had over 900 square kilometres of plantations, mainly eucalyptus trees. In 2001 Gunns paid $335 million for Tasmania's biggest woodchip company, North Forest Products, making it Australia's biggest exporter of woodchips. At one stage it became Tasmania's largest private land-owner. The company employed over 1,200 people and had suffered a dramatic turnaround in revenue in its final years, going from a turnover in excess of A$600 million in 2006, to a loss of over $350 million in 2011. Gunns was one of the largest export woodchip operation in the Southern Hemisphere, and one of two chip export companies sourcing raw materials from Tasmanian forests, the other being Neville Smith Forest Products through their SmartFiber branch in Bell Bay. Gunns announced a $900 million loss for 2011–12 and debts of $3 billion. On 25 September 2012, Gunns announced to the Australian Securities Exchange (ASX) that its board had decided to put the company into voluntary administration after its financier withdrew its support, and in March 2013 the company was placed into liquidation.

New Forests purchased the assets and employed former staff of the old company.

== Operations ==
The move to expand its base into mainland operation began with the acquisition of Auspine in 2007. In September 2010, Gunns announced that it would end logging of old growth forests and move to plantation timber. In November 2011, the Gunns Mitre 10 stores were re-branded as Beck's Home Timber and Hardware, after being sold to Danks Brothers Hardware Group, a subsidiary of Woolworths Group.

Gunns was placed into voluntary administration on 25 September 2012, and later liquidated, after it was unable to raise further capital or restructure the business.

=== Tasmania ===
Gunns operated sawmills across the state, as well as three woodchipping mills: Longreach, near Bell Bay; Triabunna, on the east coast; and Hampshire, near Burnie. The company was forced to close all three woodchipping mills and most of its sawmills in 2011. After being placed into voluntary administration in 2012, the Longreach mill was reopened and began exporting woodchips for a time.

In 2008, operations at a sawmill in Scottsdale were restructured, resulting in the loss of 70 jobs. The sackings broke an agreement with the federal government, leading to the cancellation of substantial funding assistance. In the same year, around 135 workers at another Auspine sawmill at Tonganah lost their jobs after a softwood timber contract had gone to a competitor.

=== Victoria ===
In 2009, the company was awarded a contract to operate a new woodchip processing facility at Portland. The woodchipping mill was later sold off to Australian Bluegum Plantations in 2012, for $61.8 million.

=== South Australia ===
In South Australia the company managed blue gum plantations on Kangaroo Island. In Jamestown Gunns was a major customer of Morgan Sawmill.

Gunns bought the Tarpeena softwood sawmill from the now failed Forest Enterprises Australia, and which was later sold on to Timberlink.

=== Western Australia ===
Gunns operated three hardwood sawmills in Western Australia. Their nationwide product line of timber flooring included the hardwood, jarrah, found in the southwest of the state. The timber is reddish-brown when hewn and is, "renowned for its beauty, warmth and durability". Their environmental initiatives included achieving certification under international standard ISO 14001:2004. Gunns supplied local trade and retail markets from its distribution yard in Welshpool, near Perth.

== Criticism ==
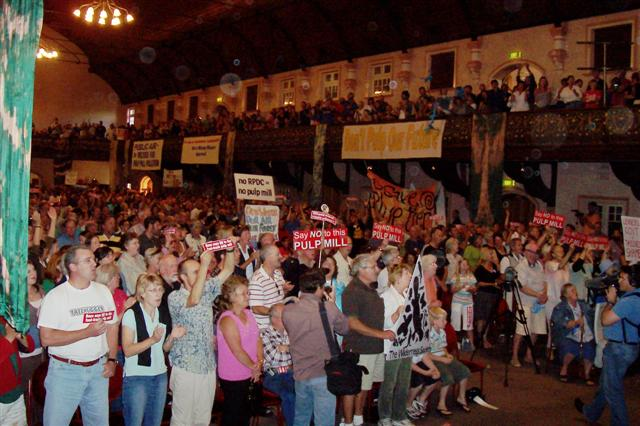
Anti-pulpmill rally (April 2007)

The company has been the focus of criticism from environmentalists, primarily for its four woodchip mills which produce 4 million tonnes of chips for export annually. Green groups claim that native forests are harvested specifically for woodchipping, whereas Gunns claim that the majority of their chips come from residue from their sawmilling and veneer operations. Gunns' major customers are paper producers in Northern Asia, mainly Japan, including Mitsubishi, Nippon and Oji Paper. Gunns has also been criticised for its logging operations in the Styx Valley and for its use of 1080 poison to kill wildlife including protected species (baiting and particularly aerial spraying of forest prior to clearfelling).

In 1989, the chairman of Gunns, Edmund Rouse, unsuccessfully attempted to bribe a Labor Party member, Jim Cox, to cross the floor, which would have allowed the pro-logging Tasmanian government of premier Robin Gray and the Liberal Party to resume power. A Royal Commission followed and convicted Rouse. Robin Gray became director of Gunns Limited on 21 February 2000. He retired from the position in 2010.

Further allegations of corruption appeared when Paul Lennon, Premier of Tasmania, had his heritage home renovated by a Gunns-owned company at the height of Gunns' push for the Bell Bay Pulp Mill. Lennon refused to disclose how much he paid for the renovations.

=== Bell Bay Pulp Mill ===
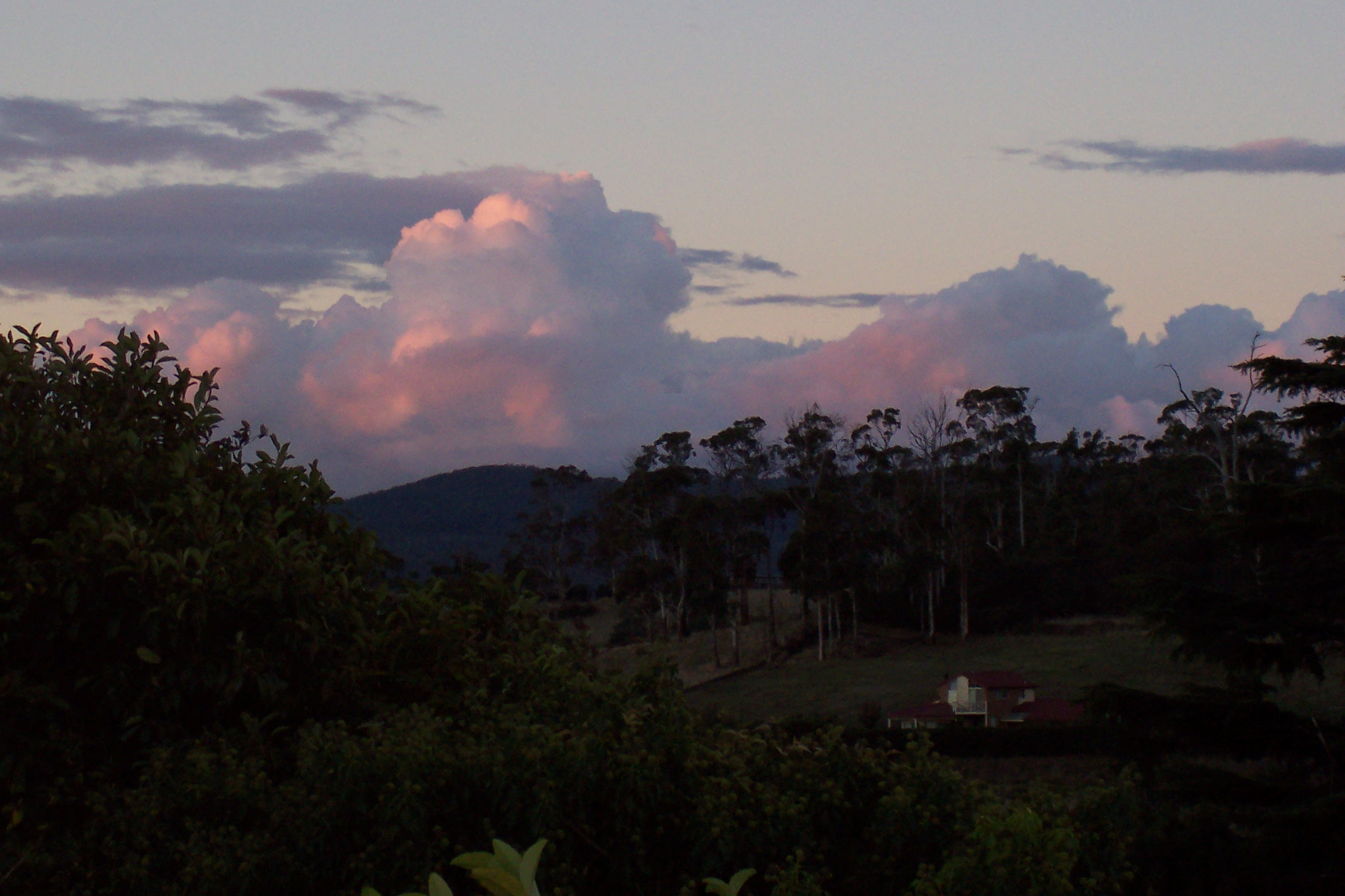
The proposed mill site taken from Kayena, Tasmania

The company was planning to build a $2 billion pulp mill in the Tamar Valley, near Launceston. The proposed mill would have used the Kraft process, Elemental Chlorine Free (ECF) bleaching, and been fed with plantation eucalypt forest timber. The project was supported by the State Government for the perceived economic and employment benefits which were said to include $6.7 billion in spending over 25 years and 2000 temporary jobs created during the construction phase, but was opposed by environmental and social activist groups. Federal Environment Minister Malcolm Turnbull gave approval for the project on Wednesday 3 October 2007. This decision was however challenged by The Wilderness Society and later overturned on appeal due to alleged flaws discovered in the approval process.

=== Gunns 20 ===
In the 2005 Gunns Limited v Marr & Ors case, Gunns filed a writ in the Supreme Court of Victoria, against 20 individuals and organisations including Senator Bob Brown, for over A$7.8 million.

The original list of defendants were:

- Bob Brown - federal Greens senator (dropped December 2006)
- Simon Leo Brown - settled following certain undertakings not to protest
- Adam Burling - Huon Valley Environment Centre - dropped
- Brian Dimmick
- Doctors for Native Forests Inc. (Split off into separate action in November 2006 and settled as part of Nicklason apology)
- Heidi Douglas - The Wilderness Society (TWS). Settled in 2009 following certain undertakings not to protest.
- Neal Funnell. Settled in 2009 following self representation and limited undertakings not to protest.
- Helen Gee (dropped November 2006)
- Lou Geraghty
- Russell Hanson - TWS. Settled in 2007 following certain undertakings not to protest.
- the Huon Valley Environment Centre Inc.
- Geoff Law - TWS. Settled in September 2008 with damages of $15,000 awarded to Gunns.
- Alec Marr - TWS. Settled in May 2008 with damages of $45,000 and costs of $70,000 awarded to Gunns.
- Leanne Minshull - Settled with TWS 2008 agreement
- Louise Morris - Settled in 2009 following self representation limited undertakings not to protest.
- Ben Morrow. Settled in May 2008 with damages of $45,000 and costs of $70,000 awarded to Gunns.
- Frank Nicklason - Settled following written public apology from Nicklason withdrawing claims of legionella in woodchip piles.
- Peter Pullinger (dropped November 2006)
- Margaret (Peg) Putt - Greens MHA (dropped December 2006)
- The Wilderness Society Inc.Settled in May 2008 with damages of $45,000 and costs of $70,000 awarded to Gunns.

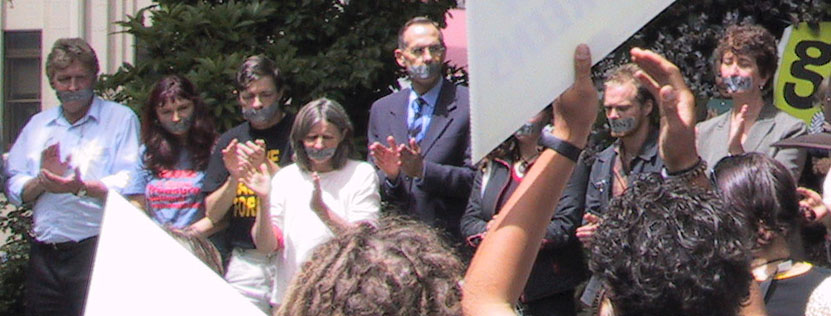
Some members of the "Gunns 20" at a protest rally, December 2004 (Bob Brown centre, Peg Putt right)

Gunns claims that the defendants have sullied its reputation and caused it to lose jobs and profits. The defendants claim that they are protecting the environment. The defendants have become collectively known as the "Gunns 20".

Opponents and critics of the case have suggested that the writ was filed with the intent to discourage public criticism of the company, in a similar vein to a Strategic lawsuit against public participation, commonly used in North America, and the English McLibel case of McDonald's Restaurants against environmental activists Helen Steel and David Morris over a pamphlet critical of the company. Gunns has maintained the position that they are merely trying to prevent parties enjoined to the writ from undertaking unlawful activities that disrupt their business. The statement of claim alleged incidents of assault against forestry workers and vandalism.

At a hearing before the Supreme Court of Victoria, an amended statement of claim lodged by the company and served on defendants on 1 July 2005 was dismissed. However, the judge in the case granted the company leave to lodge a third version of their statement of claim with the court no later than 15 August 2005.

The application continued before the court, before being brought to a close on 20 October 2006. In his ruling, The Honourable Justice Bongiorno, made an award of costs in favour of the respondents.

In November 2006, Gunns dropped the case against Helen Gee, Peter Pullinger and Doctors for Forests. In December 2006, it abandoned the claim against Greens MPs Bob Brown and Peg Putt. The other matters were all settled. A documentary about the case Defendant 5 (by and about Heidi Douglas) has been shown on ABC and Al Jazeera.

=== Redevelopment of Triabunna Woodchipping Mill ===
In 2011, online travel entrepreneur Graeme Wood (Wotif.com) and outdoor wear entrepreneur Jan Cameron (Kathmandu) purchased the Triabunna Mill from Gunns for $10 million, out-maneuvering rival forest-related bids by providing prompt payment. Wood and Cameron, both wealthy environmentalists, planned to redevelop the site as an eco-friendly tourist resort or theme park. The instigator of the negotiations was Alec Marr, formerly head of the Wilderness Society. When Tony Abbott later became Prime Minister, he and Eric Abetz wanted to compulsorily acquire the mill for woodchipping. To forestall this plan, Alec Marr secretly recruited three ship welders and an electrician, and they smashed up the control room and other critical infrastructure, so that the mill could never be in operation again.

=== Insider trading ===
In August 2013, the former CEO John Gay, who had presided over much of Gunns' latter years (1986 to 2010) including its disastrous demise, was convicted of insider trading relating to his sale of company shares in December 2009 just prior to a shock announcement of a half-year profit collapse of 98%.

== See also ==
- Forestry in Tasmania
