= Results of the 1956 Tasmanian state election =

Tasmanian state election, 13 October 1956 House of Assembly << 1955–1959 >>
Enrolled voters	174,632				
Votes cast	166,293		Turnout	95.22	+1.30
Informal votes	6,968		Informal	4.19	+0.40
Summary of votes by party
Party	Primary votes	%	Swing	Seats	Change
Labor	80,096	50.27	–2.36	15	± 0
Liberal	69,477	43.61	–1.74	15	± 0
Labor (Anti-Communist)	5,522	3.47	+3.47	0	± 0
Independent	4,139	2.60	+0.58	0	± 0
Communist	91	0.06	+0.06	0	± 0
Total	159,325			30	

This is a list of House of Assembly results for the 1956 Tasmanian election.

== Results by division ==
=== Bass ===
1956 Tasmanian state election: Bass
Party	Candidate	Votes	%	±%
Quota		4,593		
Labor	Claude Barnard (elected 1)	5,159	16.0	+2.0
Labor	Reg Turnbull (elected 2)	4,570	14.2	+3.5
Labor	Alexander Atkins (elected 6)	3,209	10.0	+1.2
Labor	John Madden	2,445	7.6	−4.3
Labor	Ronald Cocker	783	2.4	+2.4
Labor	Wallace Fraser	390	1.2	−1.5
Liberal	Bill Beattie (elected 3)	4,252	13.2	+2.5
Liberal	Fred Marriott (elected 4)	3,326	10.3	+0.7
Liberal	John Steer (elected 5)	3,177	9.9	−2.1
Liberal	William Fry	2,906	9.0	+2.0
Liberal	Ralph Fleming	631	2.0	+2.0
Labor (A-C)	Virgil Morgan	1,228	3.8	+3.8
Labor (A-C)	Clement Pollington	73	0.2	+0.2
Total formal votes		32,149	95.3	−0.6
Informal votes		1,569	4.7	+0.6
Turnout		33,718	95.0	+1.1
Party total votes
Labor		16,556	51.5	−2.0
Liberal		14,292	44.5	−1.5
Labor (A-C)		1,301	4.0	+4.0

=== Braddon ===
1956 Tasmanian state election: Braddon
Party	Candidate	Votes	%	±%
Quota		4,510		
Labor	Eric Reece (elected 1)	5,983	19.0	−2.0
Labor	Sydney Ward (elected 3)	3,805	12.1	+5.7
Labor	Charley Aylett (elected 4)	2,673	8.5	−1.5
Labor	Frank Taylor	1,641	5.2	+5.2
Labor	Cyril Cameron	613	1.9	+1.9
Labor	John Keating	587	1.9	+1.9
Liberal	Carrol Bramich (elected 2)	5,467	17.3	+17.3
Liberal	Kevin Lyons (elected 5)	2,882	9.1	−1.4
Liberal	John Fidler	2,461	7.8	−3.4
Liberal	Jack Breheny (elected 6)	2,409	7.6	−5.5
Liberal	Edward Gaby	919	2.9	−1.7
Liberal	Trevor Frampton	676	2.1	−2.2
Labor (A-C)	Terence Doody	638	2.0	+2.0
Labor (A-C)	Timothy Healy	538	1.7	+1.7
Labor (A-C)	Albin Galpin	134	0.4	+0.4
Independent	Roger Miller	139	0.4	+0.4
Total formal votes		31,565	96.6	−0.2
Informal votes		1,115	3.4	+0.2
Turnout		32,680	95.3	−1.5
Party total votes
Labor		15,302	48.5	−4.8
Liberal		14,814	46.9	+0.2
Labor (A-C)		1,310	4.2	+4.2
Independent	Roger Miller	139	0.4	+0.4

=== Denison ===
1956 Tasmanian state election: Denison
Party	Candidate	Votes	%	±%
Quota		4,938		
Labor	Robert Cosgrove (elected 1)	10,050	29.1	+4.7
Labor	Alfred White (elected 6)	2,444	7.1	−1.9
Labor	Brian Miller	2,029	5.9	+5.9
Labor	Frank Gaha (elected 3)	1,277	3.7	−0.8
Labor	Bert Lacey	623	1.8	+1.8
Labor	Eric Howroyd	414	1.2	+1.2
Liberal	Rex Townley (elected 2)	10,030	29.0	−2.3
Liberal	Bill Hodgman (elected 5)	1,391	4.0	0.0
Liberal	Gordon Cashmore	1,239	3.6	+3.6
Liberal	Horace Strutt (elected 4)	1,094	3.2	+1.4
Liberal	Alfred Robertson	362	1.0	+1.0
Liberal	William Stanton	201	0.6	−0.1
Group D	Bill Wedd	1,896	5.5	−1.2
Group D	Terry Bower	460	1.3	+1.3
Labor (A-C)	Jack Bartholomew	418	1.2	+1.2
Labor (A-C)	Anthony Orpwood	414	1.2	+1.2
Labor (A-C)	Cyril Marshall	68	0.2	+0.2
Communist	Max Bound	91	0.3	+0.3
Independent	William Lloyd	59	0.2	+0.2
Total formal votes		34,560	95.9	−0.3
Informal votes		1,496	4.1	+0.3
Turnout		36,056	95.1	+2.7
Party total votes
Labor		16,837	48.7	−2.1
Liberal		14,317	41.4	−1.1
Group D		2,356	6.8	+0.1
Labor (A-C)		900	2.6	+2.6
Communist		91	0.3	+0.3
Independent	William Lloyd	59	0.2	+0.2

=== Franklin ===
1956 Tasmanian state election: Franklin
Party	Candidate	Votes	%	±%
Quota		4,246		
Labor	John Dwyer (elected 2)	4,747	16.0	+1.2
Labor	Bill Neilson (elected 3)	3,729	12.5	−0.9
Labor	Brian Crawford (elected 6)	2,813	9.5	+3.7
Labor	Charles Hand	2,211	7.4	−1.8
Labor	James Percey	723	2.4	+2.4
Labor	Clyde McNally	343	1.2	+1.2
Liberal	Tim Jackson (elected 1)	5,508	18.5	+10.3
Liberal	Thomas Pearsall (elected 5)	2,438	8.2	−1.7
Liberal	Doug Clark	1,947	6.6	+1.1
Liberal	Mabel Miller (elected 4)	1,924	6.5	−8.7
Liberal	Walter Rayner	726	2.4	−2.8
Liberal	Tasman Pitman	208	0.7	+0.7
Independent	Robert McDougall	1,585	5.3	+5.3
Labor (A-C)	Henry Roberts	352	1.2	+1.2
Labor (A-C)	Alfred Harrold	330	1.1	+1.1
Labor (A-C)	Francis Hursey	133	0.4	+0.4
Total formal votes		29,717	95.7	−0.5
Informal votes		1,345	4.3	+0.5
Turnout		31,062	95.9	+1.7
Party total votes
Labor		14,566	49.0	−0.9
Liberal		12,751	42.9	−3.6
Independent	Robert McDougall	1,585	5.3	+5.3
Labor (A-C)		815	2.7	+2.7

=== Wilmot ===
1956 Tasmanian state election: Wilmot
Party	Candidate	Votes	%	±%
Quota		4,477		
Labor	Roy Fagan (elected 1)	5,280	16.9	−1.5
Labor	Reg Fisher (elected 3)	3,523	11.2	−2.8
Labor	Douglas Cashion (elected 2)	3,344	10.7	−2.3
Labor	Lancelot Spurr	2,046	6.5	−1.6
Labor	William McNeil	1,554	5.0	−0.1
Labor	Ralph Taylor	1,088	3.5	+3.5
Liberal	Angus Bethune (elected 4)	3,290	10.5	+2.0
Liberal	Bert Bessell (elected 6)	2,754	8.8	+8.8
Liberal	Charles Best (elected 5)	2,724	8.7	−3.7
Liberal	Amelia Best	1,884	6.0	−2.4
Liberal	Ian Gibson	1,758	5.6	+5.6
Liberal	John Strickland	893	2.8	+2.8
Labor (A-C)	Owen Doherty	662	2.1	+2.1
Labor (A-C)	Cyril Maloney	362	1.2	+1.2
Labor (A-C)	John Reidy	172	0.5	+0.5
Total formal votes		31,334	95.6	−0.4
Informal votes		1,443	4.4	+0.4
Turnout		32,777	94.8	−0.2
Party total votes
Labor		16,835	53.7	−2.0
Liberal		13,303	42.5	−1.8
Labor (A-C)		1,196	3.8	+3.8

== See also ==
- 1956 Tasmanian state election
- Members of the Tasmanian House of Assembly, 1956–1959
- Candidates of the 1956 Tasmanian state election
