= Results of the 1959 Tasmanian state election =

Election Results of the Tasmanian House of Assembly

Tasmanian state election, 2 May 1959 House of Assembly << 1956–1964 >>
Enrolled voters	180,344				
Votes cast	170,559		Turnout	94.57	–0.65
Informal votes	9,816		Informal	5.76	+1.57
Summary of votes by party
Party	Primary votes	%	Swing	Seats	Change
Labor	71,535	44.50	–5.77	17	+ 2
Liberal	66,005	41.05	–2.54	16	+ 1
Democratic Labor	8,510	5.29	+1.82	0	± 0
Independent	14,549	9.05	+6.45	2	+ 2
Communist	144	0.09	+0.03	0	± 0
Total	160,743			35	

This is a list of House of Assembly results for the 1959 Tasmanian election.

== Results by division ==
=== Bass ===
1959 Tasmanian state election: Bass
Party	Candidate	Votes	%	±%
Quota		4,057		
Liberal	Bill Beattie (elected 4)	2,621	8.1	−5.1
Liberal	John Steer (elected 6)	2,603	8.0	−1.9
Liberal	Fred Marriott (elected 7)	2,444	7.5	−2.8
Liberal	James McGowen	1,855	5.7	+5.7
Liberal	Max Bushby	1,578	4.9	+4.9
Liberal	Lionel Abbott	555	1.7	+1.7
Liberal	Harold Pope	119	0.4	+0.4
Labor	John Madden (elected 2)	3,056	9.4	+1.8
Labor	Alexander Atkins (elected 3)	2,497	7.7	−2.3
Labor	Harold Newman	1,493	4.6	+4.6
Labor	Mac Le Fevre (elected 5)	1,469	4.5	+4.5
Labor	Frank Taylor	1,100	3.4	+3.4
Labor	Wallace Fraser	642	2.0	+0.8
Group B	Reg Turnbull (elected 1)	9,065	27.9	+27.9
Group B	William Shipp	205	0.6	+0.6
Democratic Labor	Leslie Arnold	1,149	3.5	+3.5
Total formal votes		32,451	93.5	−1.8
Informal votes		2,256	6.5	+1.8
Turnout		34,707	95.0	0.0
Party total votes
Liberal		11,775	36.3	−8.2
Labor		10,257	31.6	−19.9
Group B		9,270	28.6	+28.6
Democratic Labor		1,149	3.5	−0.5

=== Braddon ===
1959 Tasmanian state election: Braddon
Party	Candidate	Votes	%	±%
Quota		3,983		
Labor	Eric Reece (elected 1)	9,688	30.4	+11.4
Labor	Sydney Ward (elected 2)	2,511	7.9	−4.2
Labor	Lloyd Costello (elected 4)	1,756	5.5	+5.5
Labor	Joseph Britton (elected 5)	1,067	3.3	+3.3
Labor	Aubrey Gaffney	582	1.8	+1.8
Labor	Patrick Streets	541	1.7	+1.7
Labor	Harold Singleton	472	1.5	+1.5
Liberal	Kevin Lyons (elected 7)	3,084	9.7	+0.6
Liberal	Jack Breheny (elected 6)	3,071	9.6	+2.0
Liberal	Carrol Bramich (elected 3)	2,588	8.1	−9.2
Liberal	William Young	2,134	6.7	+6.7
Liberal	Horace Lane	1,125	3.5	+3.5
Liberal	Arthur Abel	932	2.9	+2.9
Liberal	Charles Rand	579	1.8	+1.8
Democratic Labor	Frances Lane	750	2.4	+2.4
Democratic Labor	Bruce Cameron	742	2.3	+2.3
Democratic Labor	Alban Galpin	102	0.3	−0.1
Independent	Eric Nicholls	133	0.4	+0.4
Total formal votes		31,857	95.1	−1.5
Informal votes		1,654	4.9	+1.5
Turnout		33,511	94.2	−1.1
Party total votes
Labor		16,617	52.2	+3.7
Liberal		13,513	42.4	−4.5
Democratic Labor		1,594	5.0	+0.8
Independent	Eric Nicholls	133	0.4	+0.4

=== Denison ===
1959 Tasmanian state election: Denison
Party	Candidate	Votes	%	±%
Quota		4,106		
Liberal	Rex Townley (elected 1)	8,251	25.1	−3.9
Liberal	Archibald Park (elected 7)	1,332	4.1	+4.1
Liberal	Bill Hodgman (elected 6)	1,064	3.2	−0.8
Liberal	Donald Clark	996	3.0	+3.0
Liberal	Harold Solomon	765	2.3	+2.3
Liberal	Horace Strutt	650	2.0	−1.2
Labor	Frank Gaha (elected 3)	3,033	9.2	+5.5
Labor	Harry McLoughlin (elected 4)	2,575	7.8	+7.8
Labor	Charley Aylett (elected 5)	2,451	7.5	+7.5
Labor	Mary Cumming	1,608	4.9	+4.9
Labor	Bert Lacey	1,430	4.4	+2.6
Labor	William Wilkinson	961	2.9	+2.9
Labor	Eric Howroyd	912	2.8	+1.6
Independent	Bill Wedd (elected 2)	3,075	9.4	+3.9
Democratic Labor	Harold Senior	1,133	3.4	+3.4
Democratic Labor	Brian Bresnehan	725	2.2	+2.2
Democratic Labor	Rex McShane	380	1.2	+1.2
Independent	Nigel Abbott	1,356	4.1	+4.1
Communist	Max Bound	126	0.4	+0.4
Communist	George Chenery	18	0.1	+0.1
Total formal votes		32,841	93.6	−2.3
Informal votes		2,241	6.4	+2.3
Turnout		35,082	94.5	−0.6
Party total votes
Liberal		13,058	39.8	−1.6
Labor		12,970	39.5	−9.2
Independent	Bill Wedd	3,075	9.4	+3.9
Democratic Labor		2,238	6.8	+4.2
Independent	Nigel Abbott	1,356	4.1	+4.1
Communist		144	0.4	+0.4

=== Franklin ===
1959 Tasmanian state election: Franklin
Party	Candidate	Votes	%	±%
Quota		4,014		
Labor	Bill Neilson (elected 2)	4,123	12.8	+0.3
Labor	John Dwyer (elected 3)	3,478	10.8	−5.2
Labor	Eric Barnard (elected 5)	2,580	8.0	+8.0
Labor	Colin Brooker	1,833	5.7	+5.7
Labor	Brian Crawford	1,702	5.3	−4.2
Labor	Lynda Heaven	767	2.4	+2.4
Labor	James Percey	378	1.2	−1.2
Liberal	Tim Jackson (elected 1)	4,416	13.8	−4.7
Liberal	Thomas Pearsall (elected 6)	2,339	7.3	−0.9
Liberal	Bill Young (elected 7)	2,246	7.0	+7.0
Liberal	Mabel Miller (elected 4)	2,042	6.4	−0.1
Liberal	Donald Cuthbertson	1,183	3.7	+3.7
Liberal	Stanley Gough	953	3.0	+3.0
Liberal	Richard Tallboys	888	2.8	+2.8
Democratic Labor	Virgil Morgan	1,116	3.5	+3.5
Democratic Labor	John Dwyer	844	2.6	+2.6
Democratic Labor	Henry Scoles	321	1.0	+1.0
Democratic Labor	Allan Powell	186	0.6	+0.6
Independent	Leo McPartlan	406	1.3	+1.3
Independent	Terry Bower	190	0.6	+0.6
Independent	Francis Hursey	119	0.4	+0.4
Total formal votes		32,110	94.1	−1.6
Informal votes		2,001	5.9	+1.6
Turnout		34,111	95.4	−0.5
Party total votes
Labor		14,861	46.3	−2.7
Liberal		14,067	43.8	+0.9
Democratic Labor		2,467	7.7	+5.0
Independent	Leo McPartlan	406	1.3	+1.3
Independent	Terry Bower	190	0.6	+0.6
Independent	Francis Hursey	119	0.4	+0.4

=== Wilmot ===
1959 Tasmanian state election: Wilmot
Party	Candidate	Votes	%	±%
Quota		3,936		
Labor	Roy Fagan (elected 1)	5,402	17.2	+0.3
Labor	Douglas Cashion (elected 2)	2,806	8.9	−1.8
Labor	William Anderson	1,997	6.3	+6.3
Labor	William McNeil (elected 5)	1,983	6.3	+1.3
Labor	Thomas McDonald (elected 4)	1,944	6.2	+6.2
Labor	Lancelot Spurr	1,881	6.0	−0.5
Labor	Norman Dixon	817	2.6	+2.6
Liberal	Bert Bessell (elected 6)	2,799	8.9	+0.1
Liberal	Angus Bethune (elected 3)	2,744	8.7	−1.8
Liberal	Bob Ingamells (elected 7)	2,709	8.6	+8.6
Liberal	Ian Gibson	2,205	7.0	+1.4
Liberal	Leslie Brown	2,117	6.7	+6.7
Liberal	Amelia Best	1,018	3.2	−2.8
Democratic Labor	Harold Hill	1,062	3.4	+3.4
Total formal votes		31,484	95.0	−0.6
Informal votes		1,664	5.0	+0.6
Turnout		33,148	93.7	−1.1
Party total votes
Labor		16,830	53.5	−0.2
Liberal		13,592	43.2	+0.7
Democratic Labor		1,062	3.4	+3.4

== See also ==
- 1959 Tasmanian state election
- Members of the Tasmanian House of Assembly, 1959–1964
- Candidates of the 1959 Tasmanian state election
