= Candidates of the 1959 Tasmanian state election =

The 1959 Tasmanian state election was held on 2 May 1959.

== Retiring Members ==
No MHAs retired at this election.

== Redistributions and seat changes ==
- The House of Assembly had been expanded prior to this election, with members elected from each division increased from six to seven.
- Braddon Labor MHA Charley Aylett contested Denison.

== House of Assembly ==
Sitting members are shown in bold text. Tickets that elected at least one MHA are highlighted in the relevant colour. Successful candidates are indicated by an asterisk (*).

=== Bass ===
Seven seats were up for election. The Labor Party was defending three seats, although sitting MHA Reg Turnbull was running as an independent. The Liberal Party was defending three seats. There was one new seat.

Labor candidates	Liberal candidates	Group B candidates	Ungrouped candidates
**Alexander Atkins***; Wallace Fraser; Mac Le Fevre*; **John Madden***; Harold Newman; Frank Taylor	Lionel Abbott; **Bill Beattie***; Max Bushby; James McGowen; **Fred Marriott***; Harold Pope; **John Steer***	William Shipp; **Reg Turnbull***	Leslie Arnold (DLP)

=== Braddon ===
Seven seats were up for election. The Labor Party was defending three seats. The Liberal Party was defending three seats. There was one new seat.

Labor candidates	Liberal candidates	DLP candidates	Ungrouped candidates
Joseph Britton*; Lloyd Costello*; Aubrey Gaffney; **Eric Reece***; Harold Singleton; Patrick Streets; **Sydney Ward***	Arthur Abel; **Carrol Bramich***; **Jack Breheny***; Horace Lane; **Kevin Lyons***; Charles Rand; William Young	Bruce Cameron; Alban Galpin; Frances Lane	Eric Nicholls

=== Denison ===
Seven seats were up for election. The Labor Party was defending three seats. The Liberal Party was defending three seats. There was one new seat.

Labor candidates	Liberal candidates	DLP candidates	Communist candidates	Ungrouped candidates
**Charley Aylett***; Mary Cumming; **Frank Gaha***; **Eric Howroyd**; **Bert Lacey**; Harry McLoughlin*; William Wilkinson	Donald Clark; **Bill Hodgman***; Sir Archibald Park*; Harold Solomon; **Horace Strutt**; **Rex Townley***	Brian Bresnehan; Rex McShane; Harold Senior	Max Bound; George Chenery	Nigel Abbott; Bill Wedd*

=== Franklin ===
Seven seats were up for election. The Labor Party was defending three seats. The Liberal Party was defending three seats. There was one new seat.

Labor candidates	Liberal candidates	DLP candidates	Ungrouped candidates
Eric Barnard*; Colin Brooker; **Brian Crawford**; **John Dwyer***; Lynda Heaven; **Bill Neilson***; James Percey	Donald Cuthbertson; Stanley Gough; **Tim Jackson***; **Mabel Miller***; **Thomas Pearsall***; Richard Tallboys; Bill Young*	John Dwyer; Virgil Morgan; Allan Powell; Henry Scoles	Terry Bower; Francis Hursey; Leo McPartlan

=== Wilmot ===
Seven seats were up for election. The Labor Party was defending three seats. The Liberal Party was defending three seats. There was one new seat.

Labor candidates	Liberal candidates	Ungrouped candidates
William Anderson; **Douglas Cashion***; Norman Dixon; **Roy Fagan***; Thomas McDonald*; **William McNeil***; Lancelot Spurr	**Bert Bessell***; **Amelia Best**; **Angus Bethune***; Leslie Brown; Ian Gibson; Bob Ingamells*	Harold Hill (DLP)

== See also ==
- Members of the Tasmanian House of Assembly, 1956–1959
- Members of the Tasmanian House of Assembly, 1959–1964
