= Candidates of the 1956 Tasmanian state election =

The 1956 Tasmanian state election was held on 13 October 1956.

== Retiring Members ==
No sitting MHAs retired at this election.

== House of Assembly ==
Sitting members are shown in bold text. Tickets that elected at least one MHA are highlighted in the relevant colour. Successful candidates are indicated by an asterisk (*).

=== Bass ===
Six seats were up for election. The Labor Party was defending three seats. The Liberal Party was defending three seats.

Labor candidates	Liberal candidates	Labor (A-C) candidates
Alexander Atkins*; **Claude Barnard***; Ronald Cocker; Wallace Fraser; **John Madden**; **Reg Turnbull***	**Bill Beattie***; Ralph Fleming; William Fry; **Fred Marriott***; **John Steer***	Virgil Morgan; Clement Pollington

=== Braddon ===
Six seats were up for election. The Labor Party and the Liberal Party were each defending three seats, although Labor MHA Carrol Bramich had defected to the Liberals.

Labor candidates	Liberal candidates	Labor (A-C) candidates	Ungrouped candidates
**Charley Aylett***; Cyril Cameron; John Keating; **Eric Reece***; Frank Taylor; Sydney Ward*	**Carrol Bramich***; **Jack Breheny***; **John Fidler**; Trevor Frampton; Edward Gaby; **Kevin Lyons***	Terence Doody; Albin Galpin; Timothy Healy	Roger Miller

=== Denison ===
Six seats were up for election. The Labor Party was defending three seats. The Liberal Party was defending three seats.

Labor candidates	Liberal candidates	Labor (A-C) candidates	Independent candidates	Ungrouped candidates
**Robert Cosgrove***; **Frank Gaha***; Eric Howroyd; Bert Lacey; Brian Miller; **Alfred White***	Gordon Cashmore; **Bill Hodgman***; Alfred Robertson; William Stanton; **Horace Strutt***; **Rex Townley***	Jack Bartholomew; Cyril Marshall; Anthony Orpwood	Terry Bower; Bill Wedd	Max Bound (CPA); William Lloyd

=== Franklin ===
Six seats were up for election. The Labor Party was defending three seats. The Liberal Party was defending three seats.

Labor candidates	Liberal candidates	Labor (A-C) candidates	Ungrouped candidates
Brian Crawford*; **John Dwyer***; **Charles Hand**; Clyde McNally; **Bill Neilson***; James Percey	Doug Clark; **Tim Jackson***; **Mabel Miller***; **Thomas Pearsall***; Tasman Pitman; Walter Rayner	Alfred Harrold; Francis Hursey; Henry Roberts	Robert McDougall

=== Wilmot ===
Six seats were up for election. The Labor Party was defending three seats. The Liberal Party was defending three seats.

Labor candidates	Liberal candidates	Labor (A-C) candidates
**Douglas Cashion***; **Roy Fagan***; Reg Fisher*; William McNeil; **Lancelot Spurr**; Ralph Taylor	Bert Bessell*; **Amelia Best**; **Charles Best***; **Angus Bethune***; Ian Gibson; John Strickland	Owen Doherty; Cyril Maloney; John Reidy

== See also ==
- Members of the Tasmanian House of Assembly, 1955–1956
- Members of the Tasmanian House of Assembly, 1956–1959
