= Candidates of the 1964 Tasmanian state election =

The 1964 Tasmanian state election was held on 2 May 1964.

== Retiring Members ==
=== Labor ===
- Frank Gaha MHA (Denison)

=== Liberal ===
- Carrol Bramich MHA (Braddon)

== House of Assembly ==
Sitting members are shown in bold text. Tickets that elected at least one MHA are highlighted in the relevant colour. Successful candidates are indicated by an asterisk (*).

=== Bass ===
Seven seats were up for election. The Labor Party was defending three seats. The Liberal Party was defending three seats. The seventh seat had been won in 1959 by independent candidate Reg Turnbull, but a recount conducted following Turnbull's resignation in 1961 had elected a Labor candidate.

Labor candidates	Liberal candidates	Country candidates	DLP candidates	Group A candidates	Ungrouped candidates
**Alexander Atkins***; Eric Down; **Wallace Fraser***; Harold Holmes; Norman Laurence; **Mac Le Fevre***; Laurence Lovett; **John Madden***	**Bill Beattie***; **Max Bushby***; Stewart Chapple; Kevin Hendstock; James Henty; Jack Hookway; **James McGowen**; John Steer*	Keith Darcey; Geoffrey Finney; Graeme Millar; Colin Rattray	Edward Hare; Frederick Kaye	Leslie Arnold; Jack Harper	Brian Johnson

=== Braddon ===
Seven seats were up for election. The Labor Party was defending four seats. The Liberal Party was defending three seats.

Labor candidates	Liberal candidates	Country candidates	DLP candidates
Douglas Blacklow; **Joseph Britton**; Geoff Chisholm*; **Lloyd Costello***; Gordon O'Shannessey; **Eric Reece***; Richard Sleath; **Sydney Ward***	Wilfred Barker*; **Jack Breheny***; Ray Grey; Ernest Johnson; John Leary; **Kevin Lyons***; Charles MacKenzie; Loch Roberts; William Young	Gilbert Allen; Thomas Barnard; Roger Chalk; Anthony Hine; Elliott Hooper; Eric Webster	Ronald Cole; John Chapman-Mortimer; Abraham Neut

=== Denison ===
Seven seats were up for election. The Labor Party was defending three seats. The Liberal Party was defending three seats. Labor MHA Charley Aylett and Liberal MHA Bill Hodgman, however, were running as independents. Independent Bill Wedd was also defending a seat.

Labor candidates	Liberal candidates	Group A candidates	Ungrouped candidates
Ken Austin*; Mary Cumming; Merv Everett*; Henry Hope; Eric Howroyd; Neville Lovell; **Harry McLoughlin***; Myron Tripp	Nigel Abbott*; George Brown; Donald Clark; Robert Mather*; Gladys Schott; **Horace Strutt***; **Rex Townley***	John Clemente; **Bill Wedd**	**Charley Aylett**; Max Bound (CPA); **Bill Hodgman**; Stanislaus Ryan; Harold Senior

=== Franklin ===
Seven seats were up for election. The Labor Party was defending three seats. The Liberal Party was defending four seats, although Liberal MHA Tim Jackson was running as an independent.

Labor candidates	Liberal candidates	Country candidates	Ungrouped candidates
**Eric Barnard***; William Blackburn; Jack Frost*; Clyde Harvey; **Lynda Heaven**; Terry Martin*; **Bill Neilson***; Ken Wriedt	Doug Clark*; Eric Iles; Ken Lowrie; Jan Meldrum; **Mabel Miller**; **Thomas Pearsall***; **Bill Young***	Vernon Rae; Kathleen Reynolds; James Skinner; Gordon Suhr; Murrum Sweet	George Carr; **Tim Jackson**; Virgil Morgan (DLP)

=== Wilmot ===
Seven seats were up for election. The Labor Party was defending four seats. The Liberal Party was defending three seats.

Labor candidates	Liberal candidates	Country candidates	DLP candidates	Ungrouped candidates
William Anderson*; **Douglas Cashion***; **Roy Fagan***; **Thomas McDonald***; **William McNeil**; Henry Penny; Archibald Wilson	**Bert Bessell***; **Angus Bethune***; Henry Clark; **Bob Ingamells***; Ronald Johnstone; Kenneth O'Brien	Allen Brown; William Dunbabin; Solomon Henderson; Maxwell Oliver; Bernard Taylor	Alastair Davidson; Harold Grace	Bruce Hill

== See also ==
- Members of the Tasmanian House of Assembly, 1959–1964
- Members of the Tasmanian House of Assembly, 1964–1969
