= Results of the 1964 Tasmanian state election =

Tasmanian state election, 2 May 1964 House of Assembly << 1959–1969 >>
Enrolled voters	193,418				
Votes cast	184,571		Turnout	95.43	+0.86
Informal votes	7,980		Informal	4.32	–1.44
Summary of votes by party
Party	Primary votes	%	Swing	Seats	Change
Labor	90,631	51.32	+6.82	19	+ 2
Liberal	67,971	38.49	–2.57	16	± 0
Country	9,280	5.26	+5.26	0	± 0
Democratic Labor	3,155	1.79	–3.50	0	± 0
Communist	92	0.05	–0.04	0	± 0
Independent	5,462	3.09	–5.96	0	– 2
Total	176,591			35	

This is a list of House of Assembly results for the 1964 Tasmanian election.

== Results by division ==
=== Bass ===
1964 Tasmanian state election: Bass
Party	Candidate	Votes	%	±%
Quota		4,383		
Labor	Alexander Atkins (elected 2)	4,104	11.7	+4.0
Labor	John Madden (elected 4)	3,667	10.5	+1.1
Labor	Mac Le Fevre (elected 3)	3,514	10.0	+5.5
Labor	Wallace Fraser (elected 7)	1,872	5.3	+3.3
Labor	Laurence Lovett	1,273	3.6	+3.6
Labor	Norman Laurence	1,145	3.3	+3.3
Labor	Harold Holmes	1,013	2.9	+2.9
Labor	Eric Down	899	2.6	+2.6
Liberal	Bill Beattie (elected 1)	3,807	10.9	+2.8
Liberal	John Steer (elected 6)	3,119	8.9	+0.9
Liberal	Max Bushby (elected 5)	2,825	8.1	+3.2
Liberal	James McGowen	1,453	4.1	−1.6
Liberal	James Henty	1,375	3.9	+3.9
Liberal	Stewart Chapple	1,243	3.5	+3.5
Liberal	Jack Hookway	544	1.6	+1.6
Liberal	Kevin Hendstock	93	0.3	+0.3
Country	Geoffrey Finney	637	1.8	+1.8
Country	Keith Darcey	620	1.8	+1.8
Country	Colin Rattray	496	1.4	+1.4
Country	Graeme Millar	141	0.4	+0.4
Democratic Labor	Edward Hare	440	1.3	+1.3
Democratic Labor	Frederick Kaye	244	0.7	+0.7
Group A	Leslie Arnold	301	0.9	−2.6
Group A	Jack Harper	178	0.5	+0.5
Independent	Brian Johnson	57	0.2	+0.2
Total formal votes		35,060	95.0	+1.5
Informal votes		1,837	5.0	−1.5
Turnout		36,897	95.3	+0.3
Party total votes
Labor		17,487	49.9	+18.3
Liberal		14,459	41.2	+4.9
Country		1,894	5.4	+5.4
Democratic Labor		684	2.0	+2.0
Group A		479	1.4	−2.1
Independent	Brian Johnson	57	0.2	+0.2

=== Braddon ===
1964 Tasmanian state election: Braddon
Party	Candidate	Votes	%	±%
Quota		4,428		
Labor	Eric Reece (elected 1)	12,291	34.7	+4.3
Labor	Lloyd Costello (elected 3)	2,184	6.2	+0.7
Labor	Sydney Ward (elected 2)	1,807	5.1	−2.8
Labor	Geoff Chisholm (elected 4)	1,528	4.3	+4.3
Labor	Douglas Blacklow	761	2.1	+2.1
Labor	Joseph Britton	674	1.9	−1.4
Labor	Gordon O'Shannessey	483	1.4	+1.4
Labor	Richard Sleath	304	0.9	+0.9
Liberal	Kevin Lyons (elected 5)	2,958	8.4	−1.3
Liberal	Jack Breheny (elected 7)	2,565	7.2	−2.4
Liberal	William Young	2,117	6.0	−0.7
Liberal	Wilfred Barker (elected 6)	2,087	5.9	+5.9
Liberal	John Leary	609	1.7	+1.7
Liberal	Ray Grey	504	1.4	+1.4
Liberal	Ernest Johnson	372	1.1	+1.1
Liberal	Loch Roberts	332	0.9	+0.9
Liberal	Charles MacKenzie	124	0.4	+0.4
Country	Roger Chalk	769	2.2	+2.2
Country	Anthony Hine	570	1.6	+1.6
Country	Eric Webster	472	1.3	+1.3
Country	Elliott Hooper	399	1.1	+1.1
Country	Thomas Barnard	370	1.0	+1.0
Country	Gilbert Allen	341	1.0	+1.0
Democratic Labor	Ronald Cole	660	1.9	+1.9
Democratic Labor	John Mortimer	99	0.3	+0.3
Democratic Labor	Abraham Neut	38	0.1	+0.1
Total formal votes		35,418	96.6	+1.5
Informal votes		1,248	3.4	−1.5
Turnout		36,666	95.6	+1.4
Party total votes
Labor		20,032	56.6	+4.4
Liberal		11,668	32.9	−9.5
Country		2,921	8.2	+8.2
Democratic Labor		797	2.3	−2.7

=== Denison ===
1964 Tasmanian state election: Denison
Party	Candidate	Votes	%	±%
Quota		4,151		
Liberal	Rex Townley (elected 1)	8,903	26.8	+1.7
Liberal	Nigel Abbott (elected 3)	2,117	6.4	+6.4
Liberal	Robert Mather (elected 5)	1,742	5.2	+5.2
Liberal	George Brown	981	3.0	+3.0
Liberal	Horace Strutt (elected 6)	578	1.7	−0.3
Liberal	Donald Clark	308	0.9	−2.1
Liberal	Gladys Schott	281	0.8	+0.8
Labor	Harry McLoughlin (elected 2)	4,200	12.6	+4.8
Labor	Merv Everett (elected 4)	3,453	10.4	+10.4
Labor	Ken Austin (elected 7)	1,632	4.9	+4.9
Labor	Neville Lovell	1,397	4.2	+4.2
Labor	Mary Cumming	1,356	4.1	−0.8
Labor	Myron Tripp	1,209	3.6	+3.6
Labor	Eric Howroyd	696	2.1	−0.7
Labor	Henry Hope	680	2.0	+2.0
Group A	Bill Wedd	1,140	3.4	−6.0
Group A	John Clemente	653	2.0	+2.0
Independent	Harold Senior	1,086	3.3	+3.3
Independent	Bill Hodgman	475	1.4	+1.4
Independent	Stanislaus Ryan	125	0.4	+0.4
Independent	Charley Aylett	102	0.3	+0.3
Communist	Max Bound	92	0.3	−0.1
Total formal votes		33,206	95.5	+1.9
Informal votes		1,579	4.5	−1.9
Turnout		34,785	94.0	−0.5
Party total votes
Liberal		14,910	44.9	+5.1
Labor		14,623	44.0	+4.5
Group A		1,793	5.4	−4.0
Independent	Harold Senior	1,086	3.3	+3.3
Independent	Bill Hodgman	475	1.4	+1.4
Independent	Stanislaus Ryan	125	0.4	+0.4
Independent	Charley Aylett	102	0.3	+0.3
Communist		92	0.3	−0.1

=== Franklin ===
1964 Tasmanian state election: Franklin
Party	Candidate	Votes	%	±%
Quota		4,978		
Labor	Bill Neilson (elected 1)	8,548	21.5	+8.7
Labor	Eric Barnard (elected 2)	4,980	12.5	+4.5
Labor	Terry Martin (elected 3)	3,279	8.2	+8.2
Labor	Jack Frost (elected 5)	1,383	3.5	+3.5
Labor	William Blackburn	995	2.5	+2.5
Labor	Ken Wriedt	768	1.9	+1.9
Labor	Clyde Harvey	645	1.6	+1.6
Labor	Lynda Heaven	592	1.5	−0.9
Liberal	Thomas Pearsall (elected 4)	3,880	9.7	+2.4
Liberal	Bill Young (elected 7)	3,130	7.9	+0.6
Liberal	Mabel Miller	2,268	5.7	−0.7
Liberal	Doug Clark (elected 6)	2,074	5.2	+5.2
Liberal	Ken Lowrie	1,299	3.3	+3.3
Liberal	Eric Iles	1,187	3.0	+3.0
Liberal	Jan Meldrum	688	1.7	+1.7
Country	James Skinner	617	1.5	+1.5
Country	Vernon Rae	472	1.2	+1.2
Country	Gordon Suhr	369	0.9	+0.9
Country	Kathleen Reynolds	292	0.7	+0.7
Country	Murrum Sweet	104	0.3	+0.3
Independent	Tim Jackson	1,062	2.7	+2.7
Democratic Labor	Virgil Morgan	1,059	2.7	−0.8
Independent	George Carr	132	0.3	+0.3
Total formal votes		39,823	95.3	+1.2
Informal votes		1,957	4.7	−1.2
Turnout		41,780	96.2	+0.8
Party total votes
Labor		21,190	53.2	+6.9
Liberal		14,526	36.5	−7.3
Country		1,854	4.7	+4.7
Independent	Tim Jackson	1,062	2.7	+2.7
Democratic Labor		1,059	2.7	−0.8
Independent	George Carr	132	0.3	+0.3

=== Wilmot ===
1964 Tasmanian state election: Wilmot
Party	Candidate	Votes	%	±%
Quota		4,136		
Labor	Roy Fagan (elected 1)	5,508	16.6	−0.6
Labor	Douglas Cashion (elected 3)	4,060	12.3	+3.4
Labor	William Anderson (elected 6)	2,739	8.3	+2.0
Labor	Thomas McDonald (elected 7)	2,421	7.3	+1.1
Labor	William McNeil	1,601	4.8	−1.5
Labor	Henry Penny	572	1.7	+1.7
Labor	Archibald Wilson	398	1.2	+1.2
Liberal	Angus Bethune (elected 2)	5,142	15.5	+6.8
Liberal	Bob Ingamells (elected 4)	2,778	8.4	−0.2
Liberal	Bert Bessell (elected 5)	2,581	7.8	−1.1
Liberal	Kenneth O'Brien	1,019	3.1	+3.1
Liberal	Ronald Johnstone	667	2.0	+2.0
Liberal	Henry Clark	221	0.7	+0.7
Country	Bernard Taylor	636	1.9	+1.9
Country	Allen Brown	587	1.8	+1.8
Country	William Dunbabin	579	1.8	+1.8
Country	Maxwell Oliver	572	1.7	+1.7
Country	Solomon Henderson	237	0.7	+0.7
Democratic Labor	Alastair Davidson	499	1.5	+1.5
Democratic Labor	Harold Grace	116	0.4	+0.4
Independent	Bruce Hill	151	0.5	+0.5
Total formal votes		33,084	96.1	+1.1
Informal votes		1,359	3.9	−1.1
Turnout		34,443	95.9	+2.2
Party total votes
Labor		17,299	52.3	−1.2
Liberal		12,408	37.5	−5.7
Country		2,611	7.9	+7.9
Democratic Labor		615	1.9	+1.9
Independent	Bruce Hill	151	0.5	+0.5

== See also ==
- 1964 Tasmanian state election
- Members of the Tasmanian House of Assembly, 1964–1969
- Candidates of the 1964 Tasmanian state election
