= Members of the Tasmanian House of Assembly, 1956–1959 =

This is a list of members of the Tasmanian House of Assembly between the 13 October 1956 election and the 2 May 1959 election. The previous Darwin division had been renamed Braddon after former Premier of Tasmania Sir Edward Braddon.

| Name | Party | Division | Years in office |
|---|---|---|---|
| Hon Alexander Atkins | Labor | Bass | 1946–1948; 1956–1972 |
| Hon Charley Aylett | Labor | Braddon | 1946–1964 |
| Claude Barnard^{[1]} | Labor | Bass | 1950–1957 |
| Bill Beattie | Liberal | Bass | 1946–1950; 1954–1979 |
| Bert Bessell | Liberal | Wilmot | 1956–1976 |
| Amelia Best^{[3]} | Liberal | Wilmot | 1955–1956; 1958–1959 |
| Charles Best^{[3]} | Liberal | Wilmot | 1950–1958 |
| Angus Bethune | Liberal | Wilmot | 1946–1975 |
| Carrol Bramich | Liberal | Braddon | 1946–1964 |
| Jack Breheny | Liberal | Braddon | 1951–1972 |
| Hon Douglas Cashion | Labor | Wilmot | 1949–1972 |
| Hon Sir Robert Cosgrove^{[2]} | Labor | Denison | 1919–1922; 1925–1931; 1934–1958 |
| Brian Crawford | Labor | Franklin | 1956–1959 |
| Hon John Dwyer | Labor | Franklin | 1931–1962 |
| Hon Roy Fagan | Labor | Wilmot | 1946–1974 |
| Reg Fisher^{[4]} | Labor | Wilmot | 1956–1958 |
| Hon Dr John Gaha | Labor | Denison | 1950–1964 |
| Bill Hodgman | Liberal | Denison | 1955–1964 |
| Hon Eric Howroyd^{[2]} | Labor | Denison | 1937–1950; 1958–1959 |
| Tim Jackson | Liberal | Franklin | 1946–1964 |
| Bert Lacey^{[5]} | Labor | Denison | 1959 |
| Kevin Lyons | Liberal | Braddon | 1948–1972 |
| William McNeil^{[4]} | Labor | Wilmot | 1959–1964 |
| Hon John Madden^{[1]} | Labor | Bass | 1936–1956; 1957–1969 |
| Fred Marriott | Liberal | Bass | 1946–1961 |
| Mabel Miller | Liberal | Franklin | 1955–1964 |
| Hon Bill Neilson | Labor | Franklin | 1946–1977 |
| Thomas Pearsall | Liberal | Franklin | 1950–1966 |
| Hon Eric Reece | Labor | Braddon | 1946–1975 |
| John Steer | Liberal | Bass | 1950–1961; 1964–1968 |
| Horace Strutt | Liberal | Denison | 1946–1959; 1959–1969 |
| Rex Townley | Liberal | Denison | 1946–1965 |
| Hon Dr Reg Turnbull | Labor/Independent^{[6]} | Bass | 1946–1961 |
| Sydney Ward | Labor | Braddon | 1956–1976 |
| Hon Alfred White^{[5]} | Labor | Denison | 1941–1959 |

== Notes ==
^{1} Labor MHA for Bass, Claude Barnard, died on 6 December 1957. A recount on 23 December 1957 resulted in the election of former Labor MHA John Madden.
^{2} Labor MHA for Denison and Premier, Robert Cosgrove, resigned due to ill health on 25 August 1958. A recount on 4 September 1958 resulted in the election of Labor candidate Eric Howroyd.
^{3} Liberal MHA for Wilmot, Charles Best, resigned to contest the Council seat of Meander in November 1958. A recount on 24 November 1958 resulted in the election of former Liberal MHA Amelia Best.
^{4} Labor MHA for Wilmot, Reg Fisher, died on 29 December 1958. A recount on 15 January 1959 resulted in the election of former Labor candidate William McNeil.
^{5} Labor MHA for Denison, Alfred White, was appointed to the role of Agent-General in London in January 1959. A recount on 27 January 1959 resulted in the election of Labor candidate Bert Lacey. Lacey never got to sit in Parliament, however, as the House had been prorogued and he was defeated at the following election.
^{6} On 9 April 1959, Dr Reg Turnbull, the Treasurer and Minister for Health, was suspended from Labor Party membership by the State Executive due mainly to constant criticism of the Reece Government. The event precipitated the calling of the 1959 election for 2 May, at which Turnbull won two quotas (27.93%) in his own right.

== Sources ==
- Hughes, Colin A.; Graham, B. D. (1976). Voting for the South Australian, Western Australian and Tasmanian Lower Houses, 1890-1964. Canberra: Australian National University. ISBN 0-7081-1334-6.
- Parliament of Tasmania (2006). The Parliament of Tasmania from 1856
