= Results of the 1946 Tasmanian state election =

Tasmanian state election, 23 November 1946 House of Assembly << 1941–1948 >>
Enrolled voters	157,756				
Votes cast	143,674		Turnout	91.07%	–0.16%
Informal votes	14,484		Informal	10.08%	+5.09%
Summary of votes by party
Party	Primary votes	%	Swing	Seats	Change
Labor	65,843	50.97%	–11.63%	16	– 4
Liberal	44,158	34.25%	–2.33%	12	+ 2
Ind. Lib.^{[1]}	11,339	8.78%	+8.78%	1	+ 1
Independent	7,765	6.01%	+5.18%	1	+ 1
Total	129,190			30	

This is a list of House of Assembly results for the 1946 Tasmanian election.

== Results by division ==
=== Bass ===
1946 Tasmanian state election: Bass
Party	Candidate	Votes	%	±%
Quota		3,453		
Labor	Reg Turnbull (elected 1)	3,918	16.2	+16.2
Labor	John Madden (elected 2)	3,767	15.6	+3.4
Labor	Eric Howroyd (elected 3)	2,107	8.7	+0.6
Labor	Alexander Atkins (elected 4)	1,400	5.8	+5.8
Labor	John Carter	1,161	4.8	+4.8
Labor	Henry McGee	578	2.4	+2.4
Labor	John Quintal	570	2.4	−0.9
Labor	Alan Welsh	495	2.0	−1.3
Liberal	Fred Marriott (elected 5)	1,949	8.1	+8.1
Liberal	Bill Beattie (elected 6)	1,767	7.3	+7.3
Liberal	Allen Hollingsworth	1,392	5.8	−0.7
Liberal	William Brice	1,023	4.2	+4.2
Liberal	Sinclair Thyne	924	3.8	+3.8
Liberal	Ernest Pitchford	656	2.7	−0.8
Independent	John Ockerby	1,174	4.9	+4.9
Independent	Ern Pinkard	982	4.1	+4.1
Independent	Eugene Sullivan	304	1.3	+1.3
Total formal votes		24,167	89.1	−4.7
Informal votes		2,967	10.9	+4.7
Turnout		27,134	90.9	−0.2
Party total votes
Labor		13,996	57.9	−6.3
Liberal		7,711	31.9	−3.8
Independent	John Ockerby	1,174	4.9	+4.9
Independent	Ern Pinkard	982	4.1	+4.1
Independent	Eugene Sullivan	304	1.3	+1.3

=== Darwin ===
1946 Tasmanian state election: Darwin
Party	Candidate	Votes	%	±%
Quota		3,905		
Labor	Eric Reece (elected 1)	4,116	15.1	+15.1
Labor	Charley Aylett (elected 3)	3,368	12.3	+12.3
Labor	Michael Smith	1,164	4.3	+2.2
Labor	Carrol Bramich (elected 6)	1,152	4.2	+4.2
Labor	Bert Lacey	1,127	4.1	+4.1
Labor	James Bugg	1,070	3.9	−2.9
Labor	Philip Kelly	421	1.5	−3.7
Liberal	Jack Chamberlain (elected 2)	3,510	12.8	−0.1
Liberal	John Fidler (elected 4)	3,011	11.0	+11.0
Liberal	Henry McFie (elected 5)	2,591	9.5	+3.1
Liberal	Gerald Acheson	1,664	6.1	+1.3
Liberal	Bernard Roberts	1,207	4.4	+4.4
Liberal	Percy Williams	1,042	3.8	+3.8
Independent	Leslie Margetts	786	2.9	+2.9
Total formal votes		27,333	92.0	−3.3
Informal votes		2,365	8.0	+3.3
Turnout		29,698	90.1	−0.4
Party total votes
Labor		13,522	49.5	−9.0
Liberal		13,025	47.7	+6.2
Independent	Leslie Margetts	786	2.9	+2.9

=== Denison ===
1946 Tasmanian state election: Denison
Party	Candidate	Votes	%	±%
Quota		3,684		
Labor	Robert Cosgrove (elected 2)	4,337	16.8	−17.5
Labor	Alfred White (elected 5)	2,113	8.2	−3.0
Labor	Arthur Tyler	1,591	6.2	+6.2
Labor	Charles Culley (elected 6)	937	3.6	−4.8
Labor	John Nolan	896	3.5	+3.5
Labor	Francis Heerey	835	3.2	−2.0
Labor	Maxwell Hickman	492	1.9	+1.9
Labor	Sarah Kelly	466	1.8	−1.1
Independent	Rex Townley (elected 1)	8,247	32.0	+32.0
Liberal	Horace Strutt (elected 3)	1,191	4.6	+4.6
Liberal	Charles Atkins (elected 4)	1,165	4.5	−1.2
Liberal	Arthur Hay	870	3.4	+3.4
Liberal	Joyce Heathorn	701	2.7	+2.7
Liberal	Robert Harvey	580	2.2	−0.3
Liberal	William Morrison	483	1.9	+1.9
Group Independent	Leo McPartlan	456	1.8	+1.8
Group Independent	Percival Partington	224	0.9	+0.9
Independent	William Gittus	198	0.8	+0.8
Total formal votes		25,782	89.0	−6.0
Informal votes		3,191	11.0	+6.0
Turnout		28,973	90.0	−1.2
Party total votes
Labor		11,667	45.3	−22.4
Independent	Rex Townley	8,247	32.0	+32.0
Liberal		4,990	19.4	−11.6
Group Independent		680	2.6	+2.6
Independent	William Gittus	198	0.8	+0.8

=== Franklin ===
1946 Tasmanian state election: Franklin
Party	Candidate	Votes	%	±%
Quota		4,127		
Labor	Edward Brooker (elected 1)	5,802	20.1	−6.6
Labor	Bill Neilson (elected 4)	2,296	7.9	+7.9
Labor	John Dwyer (elected 3)	2,203	7.6	−5.7
Labor	Charles Hand	1,560	5.4	+5.4
Labor	Henry Hope	1,152	4.0	0.0
Labor	David Dicker	758	2.6	+2.6
Labor	Thomas McKinley	571	2.0	−7.5
Labor	John Brown	532	1.8	+1.8
Liberal	Reg Wright (elected 2)	4,141	14.3	+14.3
Liberal	Ron Brown	1,910	6.6	+6.6
Liberal	Tim Jackson (elected 6)	1,554	5.4	
Liberal	Archibald Park	1,205	4.2	+4.2
Liberal	Charles Geard	885	3.1	+3.1
Liberal	Donald Gatehouse	470	1.6	+1.6
Group Independent	George Gray (elected 5)	2,045	7.1	+7.1
Group Independent	Benjamin Pearsall	1,315	4.6	+4.6
Group Independent	Arthur Farley	335	1.2	+1.2
Group Independent	Joseph Nutting	153	0.5	+0.5
Total formal votes		28,887	89.5	−5.1
Informal votes		3,382	10.5	+5.1
Turnout		32,269	92.5	+0.3
Party total votes
Labor		14,874	51.5	−13.7
Liberal		10,165	35.2	+3.0
Group Independent		3,848	13.3	+13.3

=== Wilmot ===
1946 Tasmanian state election: Wilmot
Party	Candidate	Votes	%	±%
Quota		3,289		
Labor	Roy Fagan (elected 2)	2,620	11.4	+11.4
Labor	Lancelot Spurr (elected 3)	2,576	11.2	−7.5
Labor	Peter Pike (elected 4)	2,325	10.1	+5.1
Labor	Charles Burnell	1,327	5.8	+5.8
Labor	William Taylor	1,231	5.3	−4.4
Labor	Douglas Cashion	949	4.1	+4.1
Labor	Albert McShane	528	2.3	+2.3
Labor	James McQuitty	228	1.0	+1.0
Liberal	Neil Campbell (elected 1)	3,538	15.4	−1.2
Liberal	Robert Robertson (elected 6)	1,583	6.9	+6.9
Liberal	Angus Bethune (elected 5)	1,096	4.8	+4.8
Liberal	Arthur Lyne	947	4.1	+4.1
Liberal	Val Perkins	766	3.3	+3.3
Liberal	George Napier	422	1.8	+1.8
Independent	Walter Lee	1,777	7.7	+7.7
Group Independent	Neil Burbury	505	2.2	+2.2
Group Independent	William Chamberlin	381	1.7	+1.7
Independent	Alfred Bourke	222	1.0	+1.0
Total formal votes		23,021	89.9	−6.5
Informal votes		2,579	10.1	+6.5
Turnout		25,600	91.9	+0.7
Party total votes
Labor		11,784	51.2	−5.7
Liberal		8,352	36.3	−6.8
Independent	Walter Lee	1,777	7.7	+7.7
Group Independent		886	3.8	+3.8
Independent	Alfred Bourke	222	1.0	+1.0

== See also ==
- 1946 Tasmanian state election
- Members of the Tasmanian House of Assembly, 1946–1948
- Candidates of the 1946 Tasmanian state election
