= Candidates of the 1946 Tasmanian state election =

The 1946 Tasmanian state election was held on 23 November 1946. The Nationalist Party had become the Liberal Party since the 1941 election.

== Retiring Members ==
=== Labor ===
- Ernest West MHA (Wilmot)

=== Liberal ===
- Henry Baker MHA (Franklin)
- Frank Marriott MHA (Bass)
- Sir John McPhee MHA (Franklin)

== House of Assembly ==
Sitting members are shown in bold text. Tickets that elected at least one MHA are highlighted in the relevant colour. Successful candidates are indicated by an asterisk (*).

=== Bass ===
Six seats were up for election. The Labor Party was defending four seats. The Liberal Party was defending two seats, although John Ockerby had not joined the Liberal Party and was running as an independent.

Labor candidates	Liberal candidates	Ungrouped candidates
Alexander Atkins*; John Carter; **Eric Howroyd***; **John Madden***; Henry McGee; **John Quintal**; Reg Turnbull*; **Alan Welsh**	Bill Beattie*; William Brice; Allen Hollingsworth; Fred Marriott*; Ernest Pitchford; Sinclair Thyne	**John Ockerby**; Ern Pinkard; Eugene Sullivan

=== Darwin ===
Six seats were up for election. The Labor Party was defending four seats. The Liberal Party was defending two seats.

Labor candidates	Liberal candidates	Ungrouped candidates
Charley Aylett*; Carrol Bramich*; **James Bugg**; **Philip Kelly**; Bert Lacey; **Henry Lane**; Eric Reece*; **Michael Smith**	Gerald Acheson; **Jack Chamberlain***; John Fidler*; **Henry McFie***; Bernard Roberts; Percy Williams	Leslie Margetts

=== Denison ===
Six seats were up for election. The Labor Party was defending four seats. The Liberal Party was defending two seats.

Labor candidates	Liberal candidates	Independent candidates	Ungrouped candidates
**Robert Cosgrove***; **Charles Culley***; **Francis Heerey**; Maxwell Hickman; Sarah Kelly; John Nolan; Arthur Tyler; **Alfred White***	**Charles Atkins***; **Robert Harvey**; Arthur Hay; Joyce Heathorn; William Morrison; Horace Strutt*	Leo McPartlan; Percival Partington	William Gittus; Rex Townley*

=== Franklin ===
Six seats were up for election. The Labor Party was defending four seats. The Liberal Party was defending two seats.

Labor candidates	Liberal candidates	Independent candidates
**Edward Brooker***; John Brown; David Dicker; **John Dwyer***; Charles Hand; **Henry Hope**; **Thomas McKinley**; Bill Neilson*	Ron Brown; Donald Gatehouse; Charles Geard; Tim Jackson*; Archibald Park; Reg Wright*	Arthur Farley; George Gray*; Joseph Nutting; Benjamin Pearsall

=== Wilmot ===
Six seats were up for election. The Labor Party was defending four seats. The Liberal Party was defending two seats, although Sir Walter Lee was running as an independent.

Labor candidates	Liberal candidates	Independent candidates	Ungrouped candidates
Charles Burnell; Douglas Cashion; Roy Fagan*; James McQuitty; Albert McShane; **Peter Pike***; **Lancelot Spurr***; **William Taylor**	Angus Bethune*; **Neil Campbell***; Arthur Lyne; George Napier; Val Perkins; Robert Robertson*	Neil Burbury; William Chamberlin	Alfred Bourke; **Sir Walter Lee**

== See also ==
- Members of the Tasmanian House of Assembly, 1941–1946
- Members of the Tasmanian House of Assembly, 1946–1948
