= Candidates of the 1969 Tasmanian state election =

The 1969 Tasmanian state election was held on 10 May 1969.

== Retiring Members ==
No MLAs retired in the 1969 election.

== House of Assembly ==
Sitting members are shown in bold text. Tickets that elected at least one MHA are highlighted in the relevant colour. Successful candidates are indicated by an asterisk (*).

=== Bass ===
Seven seats were up for election. The Labor Party was defending four seats. The Liberal Party was defending three seats.

Labor candidates	Liberal candidates	Centre candidates	DLP candidates	Group A candidates	Ungrouped candidates
**Alexander Atkins***; Michael Barnard*; Eric Down; Allan Foster*; **Wallace Fraser**; **Mac Le Fevre**; Laurence Lovett; **John Madden**	Timothy Barrenger*; **Bill Beattie***; Henry Bertram; **Max Bushby***; Don Gilmour; **James Henty***; Norman Tilley	Bruce Kekwick; Edward Smith; Jeffrey Weston	Peter Ferrall; Eris Smyth	Leslie Arnold; George Brookes	Neil Pitt

=== Braddon ===
Seven seats were up for election. The Labor Party was defending four seats. The Liberal Party was defending three seats.

Labor candidates	Liberal candidates	Centre candidates	DLP candidates
Joseph Britton; **Geoff Chisholm***; **Lloyd Costello***; Jack Crawford; Donald Crowe; Gordon O'Shannessey; **Eric Reece***; **Sydney Ward***	**Wilfred Barker***; **Jack Breheny***; John Davis; Ray Grey; Alan Moore; Bruce Walker; William Young	Laurie Heathorn; Lloyd Hodgkinson; Lawrence Ling; **Kevin Lyons***	John Chapman-Mortimer; Dudley McNamara

=== Denison ===
Seven seats were up for election. The Labor Party was defending three seats. The Liberal Party was defending four seats.

Labor candidates	Liberal candidates	Centre candidates	DLP candidates	Ungrouped candidates
**Ken Austin***; Neil Batt*; **Merv Everett***; Donald Finlay; Malcolm Hills; **Harry McLoughlin**; Reginald Richardson; Albert Schluter	**Nigel Abbott***; Bob Baker*; Ronald Banks; Max Bingham*; **George Brown**; John Hand; **Robert Mather***; **Horace Strutt**	Jim Campbell; James Rimmer	Michael Delaney; Leslie Foley	Bill Wedd

=== Franklin ===
Seven seats were up for election. The Labor Party was defending four seats. The Liberal Party was defending three seats.

Labor candidates	Liberal candidates	Centre candidates	DLP candidates
**Eric Barnard***; John Dillon; Daniel Doyle; **Jack Frost***; Doug Lowe*; **Terry Martin**; **Bill Neilson***; John Parsons	**Doug Clark***; Stanley Gough*; **Eric Iles**; Geoff Pearsall*; William Ryan; Leslie Thirgood; **Bill Young**	James Earnshaw; Gerald Lyons	Kathleen Delaney; Denis Sainsbury

=== Wilmot ===
Seven seats were up for election. The Labor Party was defending four seats. The Liberal Party was defending three seats.

Labor candidates	Liberal candidates	Centre candidates	DLP candidates	Group B candidates
**William Anderson***; Stephen Byron; **Douglas Cashion***; **Roy Fagan***; **Thomas McDonald**; John MacRostie; Don Marriott; Harold Singleton	**Bert Bessell***; **Angus Bethune***; Ian Braid*; Michael Ibbott; **Bob Ingamells***; Kenneth O'Brien; Robert Winspear	Allen Brown; Geoffrey Dean; Anthony Weston	Ronald Butterworth; Darryl Sulzberger	Norman Feil

== See also ==
- Members of the Tasmanian House of Assembly, 1964–1969
- Members of the Tasmanian House of Assembly, 1969–1972
