= Electoral results for the Division of Lyons (state, 1913-1969) =

This is a list of electoral results for the division of Bass in Tasmanian elections from 1913 through 1969.

== Election results ==
=== Elections in the 1960s ===
==== 1969 ====
1969 Tasmanian state election: Wilmot
Party	Candidate	Votes	%	±%
Quota		4,793		
Liberal	Angus Bethune (elected 1)	6,598	17.2	+1.2
Liberal	Bob Ingamells (elected 3)	4,005	10.4	+2.0
Liberal	Bert Bessell (elected 4)	3,599	9.4	+1.6
Liberal	Ian Braid (elected 7)	1,364	3.6	+3.6
Liberal	Michael Ibbott	1,218	3.2	+3.2
Liberal	Kenneth O'Brien	1,112	2.9	−0.2
Liberal	Robert Winspear	488	1.3	+1.3
Labor	Roy Fagan (elected 2)	4,895	12.8	−3.8
Labor	Douglas Cashion (elected 5)	3,450	9.0	−3.3
Labor	William Anderson (elected 6)	3,295	8.6	+0.3
Labor	Thomas McDonald	2,249	5.9	−1.4
Labor	Stephen Byron	1,692	4.4	+4.4
Labor	Don Marriott	1,090	2.8	+2.8
Labor	John MacRostie	583	1.5	+1.5
Labor	Harold Singleton	578	1.5	+1.5
Centre	Allen Brown	1,102	2.9	+2.9
Centre	Geoffrey Dean	248	0.6	+0.6
Centre	Anthony Weston	162	0.4	+0.4
Democratic Labor	Ronald Butterworth	292	0.8	+0.8
Democratic Labor	Darryl Sulzberger	161	0.4	+0.4
Independent	Norman Feil	158	0.4	+0.4
Total formal votes		38,339	95.1	−1.0
Informal votes		1,983	4.9	+1.0
Turnout		40,322	95.4	−0.5
Party total votes
Liberal		18,384	48.0	+10.5
Labor		17,832	46.5	−5.8
Centre		1,512	3.9	+3.9
Democratic Labor		453	1.2	−0.7
Independent	Norman Feil	158	0.4	+0.4

==== 1964 ====
1964 Tasmanian state election: Wilmot
Party	Candidate	Votes	%	±%
Quota		4,136		
Labor	Roy Fagan (elected 1)	5,508	16.6	−0.6
Labor	Douglas Cashion (elected 3)	4,060	12.3	+3.4
Labor	William Anderson (elected 6)	2,739	8.3	+2.0
Labor	Thomas McDonald (elected 7)	2,421	7.3	+1.1
Labor	William McNeil	1,601	4.8	−1.5
Labor	Henry Penny	572	1.7	+1.7
Labor	Archibald Wilson	398	1.2	+1.2
Liberal	Angus Bethune (elected 2)	5,142	15.5	+6.8
Liberal	Bob Ingamells (elected 4)	2,778	8.4	−0.2
Liberal	Bert Bessell (elected 5)	2,581	7.8	−1.1
Liberal	Kenneth O'Brien	1,019	3.1	+3.1
Liberal	Ronald Johnstone	667	2.0	+2.0
Liberal	Henry Clark	221	0.7	+0.7
Country	Bernard Taylor	636	1.9	+1.9
Country	Allen Brown	587	1.8	+1.8
Country	William Dunbabin	579	1.8	+1.8
Country	Maxwell Oliver	572	1.7	+1.7
Country	Solomon Henderson	237	0.7	+0.7
Democratic Labor	Alastair Davidson	499	1.5	+1.5
Democratic Labor	Harold Grace	116	0.4	+0.4
Independent	Bruce Hill	151	0.5	+0.5
Total formal votes		33,084	96.1	+1.1
Informal votes		1,359	3.9	−1.1
Turnout		34,443	95.9	+2.2
Party total votes
Labor		17,299	52.3	−1.2
Liberal		12,408	37.5	−5.7
Country		2,611	7.9	+7.9
Democratic Labor		615	1.9	+1.9
Independent	Bruce Hill	151	0.5	+0.5

=== Elections in the 1950s ===
==== 1959 ====
1959 Tasmanian state election: Wilmot
Party	Candidate	Votes	%	±%
Quota		3,936		
Labor	Roy Fagan (elected 1)	5,402	17.2	+0.3
Labor	Douglas Cashion (elected 2)	2,806	8.9	−1.8
Labor	William Anderson	1,997	6.3	+6.3
Labor	William McNeil (elected 5)	1,983	6.3	+1.3
Labor	Thomas McDonald (elected 4)	1,944	6.2	+6.2
Labor	Lancelot Spurr	1,881	6.0	−0.5
Labor	Norman Dixon	817	2.6	+2.6
Liberal	Bert Bessell (elected 6)	2,799	8.9	+0.1
Liberal	Angus Bethune (elected 3)	2,744	8.7	−1.8
Liberal	Bob Ingamells (elected 7)	2,709	8.6	+8.6
Liberal	Ian Gibson	2,205	7.0	+1.4
Liberal	Leslie Brown	2,117	6.7	+6.7
Liberal	Amelia Best	1,018	3.2	−2.8
Democratic Labor	Harold Hill	1,062	3.4	+3.4
Total formal votes		31,484	95.0	−0.6
Informal votes		1,664	5.0	+0.6
Turnout		33,148	93.7	−1.1
Party total votes
Labor		16,830	53.5	−0.2
Liberal		13,592	43.2	+0.7
Democratic Labor		1,062	3.4	+3.4

==== 1956 ====
1956 Tasmanian state election: Wilmot
Party	Candidate	Votes	%	±%
Quota		4,477		
Labor	Roy Fagan (elected 1)	5,280	16.9	−1.5
Labor	Reg Fisher (elected 3)	3,523	11.2	−2.8
Labor	Douglas Cashion (elected 2)	3,344	10.7	−2.3
Labor	Lancelot Spurr	2,046	6.5	−1.6
Labor	William McNeil	1,554	5.0	−0.1
Labor	Ralph Taylor	1,088	3.5	+3.5
Liberal	Angus Bethune (elected 4)	3,290	10.5	+2.0
Liberal	Bert Bessell (elected 6)	2,754	8.8	+8.8
Liberal	Charles Best (elected 5)	2,724	8.7	−3.7
Liberal	Amelia Best	1,884	6.0	−2.4
Liberal	Ian Gibson	1,758	5.6	+5.6
Liberal	John Strickland	893	2.8	+2.8
Labor (A-C)	Owen Doherty	662	2.1	+2.1
Labor (A-C)	Cyril Maloney	362	1.2	+1.2
Labor (A-C)	John Reidy	172	0.5	+0.5
Total formal votes		31,334	95.6	−0.4
Informal votes		1,443	4.4	+0.4
Turnout		32,777	94.8	−0.2
Party total votes
Labor		16,835	53.7	−2.0
Liberal		13,303	42.5	−1.8
Labor (A-C)		1,196	3.8	+3.8

==== 1955 ====
1955 Tasmanian state election: Wilmot
Party	Candidate	Votes	%	±%
Quota		4,651		
Labor	Roy Fagan (elected 1)	5,983	18.4	−3.1
Labor	Douglas Cashion (elected 2)	4,224	13.0	+3.3
Labor	Reg Fisher	2,722	8.4	+3.0
Labor	Lancelot Spurr (elected 6)	2,652	8.1	+0.7
Labor	William McNeil	1,664	5.1	+5.1
Labor	Walter Haas	878	2.7	+2.7
Liberal	Charles Best (elected 3)	4,037	12.4	+2.5
Liberal	Angus Bethune (elected 4)	2,760	8.5	+1.8
Liberal	Amelia Best (elected 5)	2,727	8.4	+8.4
Liberal	Robert Thompson	1,831	5.6	+5.6
Liberal	Peter Homfray	1,739	5.3	+5.3
Liberal	Maurice Boucher	1,336	4.1	+4.1
Total formal votes		32,553	96.0	+0.3
Informal votes		1,355	4.0	−0.3
Turnout		33,908	95.0	+0.9
Party total votes
Labor		18,123	55.7	+4.5
Liberal		14,430	44.3	−4.5

==== 1950 ====
1950 Tasmanian state election: Wilmot
Party	Candidate	Votes	%	±%
Quota		4,286		
Labor	Roy Fagan (elected 1)	6,456	21.5	+1.5
Labor	Douglas Cashion (elected 3)	2,905	9.7	+4.8
Labor	Lancelot Spurr (elected 6)	2,211	7.4	−1.2
Labor	Reg Fisher	1,621	5.4	+5.4
Labor	Angus von Bertouch	1,155	3.9	+3.9
Labor	Robert Phair	996	3.3	+3.3
Liberal	Neil Campbell (elected 2)	5,446	18.2	−4.0
Liberal	Charles Best (elected 4)	2,974	9.9	+5.1
Liberal	Angus Bethune (elected 5)	2,012	6.7	+2.2
Liberal	Percy Williams	1,989	6.6	+6.6
Liberal	Robert Robertson	1,402	4.7	−0.5
Liberal	George Hodson	830	2.8	+2.8
Total formal votes		29,997	95.7	−1.0
Informal votes		1,340	4.3	+1.0
Turnout		31,337	94.1	+1.6
Party total votes
Labor		15,344	51.2	−0.5
Liberal		14,653	48.8	+3.0

=== Elections in the 1940s ===
==== 1948 ====
1948 Tasmanian state election: Wilmot
Party	Candidate	Votes	%	±%
Quota		3,695		
Labor	Roy Fagan (elected 2)	5,172	20.0	+8.6
Labor	Lancelot Spurr (elected 6)	2,232	8.6	−2.6
Labor	Peter Pike (elected 5)	2,229	8.6	−1.5
Labor	Charles Burnell	1,882	7.3	+1.5
Labor	Douglas Cashion	1,266	4.9	+0.8
Labor	Henry Gregg	602	2.3	+2.3
Liberal	Neil Campbell (elected 1)	5,748	22.2	+6.8
Liberal	Robert Wordsworth	1,736	6.7	+6.7
Liberal	Robert Robertson (elected 4)	1,343	5.2	−1.7
Liberal	Charles Best	1,252	4.8	+4.8
Liberal	Angus Bethune (elected 3)	1,154	4.5	−0.3
Liberal	Leslie Brown	607	2.3	+2.3
Independent	Thomas Churchward-Kelly	638	2.5	+2.5
Total formal votes		25,861	96.7	+6.8
Informal votes		877	3.3	−6.8
Turnout		26,738	92.5	+0.6
Party total votes
Labor		13,383	51.7	+0.5
Liberal		11,840	45.8	+9.5
Independent	Thomas Churchward-Kelly	638	2.5	+2.5

==== 1946 ====
1946 Tasmanian state election: Wilmot
Party	Candidate	Votes	%	±%
Quota		3,289		
Labor	Roy Fagan (elected 2)	2,620	11.4	+11.4
Labor	Lancelot Spurr (elected 3)	2,576	11.2	−7.5
Labor	Peter Pike (elected 4)	2,325	10.1	+5.1
Labor	Charles Burnell	1,327	5.8	+5.8
Labor	William Taylor	1,231	5.3	−4.4
Labor	Douglas Cashion	949	4.1	+4.1
Labor	Albert McShane	528	2.3	+2.3
Labor	James McQuitty	228	1.0	+1.0
Liberal	Neil Campbell (elected 1)	3,538	15.4	−1.2
Liberal	Robert Robertson (elected 6)	1,583	6.9	+6.9
Liberal	Angus Bethune (elected 5)	1,096	4.8	+4.8
Liberal	Arthur Lyne	947	4.1	+4.1
Liberal	Val Perkins	766	3.3	+3.3
Liberal	George Napier	422	1.8	+1.8
Independent	Walter Lee	1,777	7.7	+7.7
Group Independent	Neil Burbury	505	2.2	+2.2
Group Independent	William Chamberlin	381	1.7	+1.7
Independent	Alfred Bourke	222	1.0	+1.0
Total formal votes		23,021	89.9	−6.5
Informal votes		2,579	10.1	+6.5
Turnout		25,600	91.9	+0.7
Party total votes
Labor		11,784	51.2	−5.7
Liberal		8,352	36.3	−6.8
Independent	Walter Lee	1,777	7.7	+7.7
Group Independent		886	3.8	+3.8
Independent	Alfred Bourke	222	1.0	+1.0

==== 1941 ====
1941 Tasmanian state election: Wilmot
Party	Candidate	Votes	%	±%
Quota		3,194		
Labor	Lancelot Spurr (elected 1)	4,187	18.7	+13.4
Labor	David O'Keefe (elected 3)	3,152	14.1	+6.9
Labor	William Taylor (elected 5)	2,176	9.7	+6.8
Labor	Ernest West (elected 6)	2,069	9.3	+9.3
Labor	Peter Pike	1,126	5.0	+5.0
Nationalist	Neil Campbell (elected 2)	3,708	16.6	+3.9
Nationalist	Walter Lee (elected 4)	2,295	10.3	+0.4
Nationalist	Francis Foster	1,560	7.0	−2.5
Nationalist	Milton Taylor	929	4.2	+4.2
Nationalist	Thomas Johnston	586	2.6	+2.6
Nationalist	Raymond Madden	566	2.5	+2.5
Total formal votes		22,354	96.4	−0.7
Informal votes		839	3.6	+0.7
Turnout		23,193	91.2	−2.7
Party total votes
Labor		12,710	56.9	+1.5
Nationalist		9,644	43.1	+1.2

=== Elections in the 1930s ===
==== 1937 ====
1937 Tasmanian state election: Wilmot
Party	Candidate	Votes	%	±%
Quota		3,257		
Labor	Eric Ogilvie (elected 1)	6,329	27.8	−1.0
Labor	George Becker (elected 2)	2,801	12.3	+12.3
Labor	David O'Keefe (elected 3)	1,639	7.2	+7.2
Labor	Lancelot Spurr	1,206	5.3	+5.3
Labor	William Taylor	652	2.9	+2.9
Nationalist	Neil Campbell (elected 4)	2,904	12.7	+12.7
Nationalist	Walter Lee (elected 6)	2,251	9.9	+9.9
Nationalist	Francis Foster (elected 5)	2,170	9.5	+5.6
Nationalist	Donald Cameron	1,272	5.6	+5.6
Nationalist	Arthur Hutchinson	388	1.7	+1.7
Nationalist	Charles Salter	287	1.3	+1.3
Nationalist	William Ritchie	270	1.2	+1.2
Independent	William Drake	542	2.4	+2.4
Independent	Athol Smith	81	0.4	+0.4
Total formal votes		22,792	97.1	+1.0
Informal votes		677	2.9	−1.0
Turnout		23,469	93.9	+0.3
Party total votes
Labor		12,627	55.4	+19.6
Nationalist		9,542	41.9	−15.1
Independent	William Drake	542	2.4	+2.4
Independent	Athol Smith	81	0.4	+0.4

==== 1934 ====
1934 Tasmanian state election: Wilmot
Party	Candidate	Votes	%	±%
Quota		3,119		
Nationalist	Walter Lee (elected 2)	3,112	14.3	+2.0
Nationalist	Neil Campbell (elected 3)	2,550	11.7	−6.1
Nationalist	Donald Cameron (elected 5)	1,239	5.7	+5.7
Nationalist	Percy Best	1,180	5.4	−3.1
Nationalist	Harold Lord	1,070	4.9	+4.9
Nationalist	Llewellyn Atkinson	862	3.9	−8.2
Nationalist	Francis Foster	844	3.9	+3.9
Nationalist	Alfred Burbury	720	3.3	−8.2
Nationalist	Henry Wilson	449	2.1	+2.1
Nationalist	Peter Sattler	410	1.9	+1.9
Labor	Eric Ogilvie (elected 1)	3,708	17.0	+6.1
Labor	David O'Keefe (elected 4)	1,631	7.5	+7.5
Labor	Lancelot Spurr	1,272	5.8	+5.8
Labor	Francis Cosgrove	1,033	4.7	+4.7
Labor	Charles Metz	161	0.7	+0.7
Independent Labor	George Becker (elected 6)	1,585	7.3	+7.3
Total formal votes		21,826	96.1	+0.2
Informal votes		875	3.9	−0.2
Turnout		22,701	93.6	−0.6
Party total votes
Nationalist		12,436	57.0	−5.1
Labor		7,805	35.8	+1.6
Independent Labor	George Becker	1,585	7.3	+7.3

==== 1931 ====
1931 Tasmanian state election: Wilmot
Party	Candidate	Votes	%	±%
Quota		2,904		
Nationalist	Neil Campbell (elected 1)	3,611	17.8	+3.2
Nationalist	Walter Lee (elected 6)	2,495	12.3	−2.4
Nationalist	Llewellyn Atkinson (elected 4)	2,453	12.1	+12.1
Nationalist	Alfred Burbury (elected 5)	2,341	11.5	+11.5
Nationalist	Percy Best	1,732	8.5	−3.3
Labor	Jens Jensen (elected 2)	2,737	13.5	+7.2
Labor	Eric Ogilvie (elected 3)	2,214	10.9	+6.8
Labor	Herbert Osborne	1,040	5.1	+0.3
Labor	William Shoobridge	526	2.6	+0.9
Labor	Henry Lane	430	2.1	+2.1
Independent	John Williams	461	2.3	+2.3
Independent	Benjamin Whitham	284	1.4	+1.4
Total formal votes		20,324	95.9	0.0
Informal votes		867	4.1	0.0
Turnout		21,191	94.2	+13.6
Party total votes
Nationalist		12,632	62.1	+20.1
Labor		6,947	34.2	−16.7
Independent	John Williams	461	2.3	+2.3
Independent	Benjamin Whitham	284	1.4	+1.4

=== Elections in the 1920s ===
==== 1928 ====
1928 Tasmanian state election: Wilmot
Party	Candidate	Votes	%	±%
Quota		2,322		
Labor	Joseph Lyons (elected 1)	4,709	29.0	−1.6
Labor	Jens Jensen (elected 5)	1,027	6.3	+6.3
Labor	Herbert Osborne	781	4.8	+2.4
Labor	Leonard Bennett	673	4.1	+4.1
Labor	Eric Ogilvie (elected 6)	661	4.1	+4.1
Labor	William Shoobridge	282	1.7	−0.4
Labor	John Palamountain	141	0.9	−0.6
Nationalist	Walter Lee (elected 2)	2,394	14.7	+4.9
Nationalist	Neil Campbell (elected 3)	2,374	14.6	+3.5
Nationalist	Percy Best (elected 4)	1,911	11.8	+5.7
Nationalist	George Rowell	153	0.9	+0.9
Independent	Norman Cameron	723	4.4	−6.8
Independent	Walter McShane	419	2.6	+2.6
Total formal votes		16,248	95.9	−1.7
Informal votes		698	4.1	+1.7
Turnout		16,946	80.6	+16.0
Party total votes
Labor		8,274	50.9	+4.8
Nationalist		6,832	42.0	+15.3
Independent	Norman Cameron	723	4.4	−6.8
Independent	Walter McShane	419	2.6	+2.6

==== 1925 ====
1925 Tasmanian state election: Wilmot
Party	Candidate	Votes	%	±%
Quota		1,927		
Labor	Joseph Lyons (elected 1)	4,125	30.6	+12.9
Labor	Michael O'Keefe (elected 2)	1,037	7.7	−0.1
Labor	Herbert Osborne	328	2.4	+2.4
Labor	William Shoobridge (elected 5)	283	2.1	+2.1
Labor	Will Reece	252	1.9	+1.9
Labor	John Palamountain	197	1.5	+1.5
Nationalist	Neil Campbell (elected 3)	1,499	11.1	+3.4
Nationalist	Percy Best	828	6.1	+6.1
Nationalist	Albert Bendall	700	5.2	+5.2
Nationalist	Ernest Blyth	578	4.3	+4.3
Independent	Norman Cameron (elected 4)	1,511	11.2	+2.8
Liberal	Walter Lee (elected 6)	1,325	9.8	−2.6
Liberal	John Peters	110	0.8	+0.8
Independent	John Newman	711	5.3	+5.3
Total formal votes		13,484	97.6	+0.8
Informal votes		331	2.4	−0.8
Turnout		13,815	64.6	+1.1
Party total votes
Labor		6,222	46.1	+18.7
Nationalist		3,605	26.7	−11.6
Independent	Norman Cameron	1,511	11.2	+2.8
Liberal		1,435	10.6	+10.6
Independent	John Newman	711	5.3	+5.3

==== 1922 ====
1922 Tasmanian state election: Wilmot
Party	Candidate	Votes	%	±%
Quota		1,611		
Nationalist	Walter Lee (elected 2)	1,398	12.4	−13.0
Nationalist	Henry McFie	916	8.1	+3.2
Nationalist	Neil Campbell (elected 5)	864	7.7	+7.7
Nationalist	George Pullen	587	5.2	−3.0
Labor	Joseph Lyons (elected 1)	1,997	17.7	+0.5
Labor	Michael O'Keefe (elected 6)	880	7.8	+1.2
Labor	Francis Masters	212	1.9	+1.9
Country	Albert Bendall (elected 4)	1,107	9.8	+9.8
Country	Ernest Blyth (elected 3)	987	8.8	+8.8
Country	Walter Gowans	237	2.1	+2.1
Country	Arthur Lade	194	1.7	+1.7
Independent	Norman Cameron	951	8.4	+8.4
Independent	Annette Youl	358	3.2	+3.2
Independent	Frederick Bottomley	32	0.3	+0.3
Total formal votes		11,273	96.8	+2.9
Informal votes		373	3.2	−2.9
Turnout		11,646	63.5	+0.3
Party total votes
Nationalist		4,318	38.3	−31.5
Labor		3,089	27.4	−2.8
Country		2,525	22.4	+22.4
Independent	Norman Cameron	951	8.4	+8.4
Independent	Annette Youl	358	3.2	+3.2
Independent	Frederick Bottomley	32	0.3	+0.3

=== Elections in the 1910s ===
==== 1919 ====
1919 Tasmanian state election: Wilmot
Party	Candidate	Votes	%	±%
Quota		1,564		
Nationalist	Walter Lee (elected 1)	2,775	25.3	+5.0
Nationalist	Ernest Blyth (elected 3)	1,668	15.2	+3.8
Nationalist	Herbert Hays (elected 4)	973	8.9	+1.5
Nationalist	George Pullen (elected 6)	895	8.2	+8.2
Nationalist	Henry McFie	531	4.9	+4.9
Nationalist	Frank Rose	505	4.6	+4.6
Nationalist	William Connell	293	2.7	+0.5
Labor	Joseph Lyons (elected 2)	1,892	17.3	−4.4
Labor	Michael O'Keefe (elected 5)	720	6.6	−3.0
Labor	Sidney Foskett	352	3.2	+3.2
Labor	Christopher Sheedy	342	3.1	+3.1
Total formal votes		10,946	93.9	−0.3
Informal votes		706	6.1	+0.3
Turnout		11,652	63.2	−9.9
Party total votes
Nationalist		7,640	69.8	+15.1
Labor		3,306	30.2	−8.9

==== 1916 ====
1916 Tasmanian state election: Wilmot
Party	Candidate	Votes	%	±%
Quota		1,850		
Liberal	Walter Lee (elected 2)	2,631	20.3	+8.5
Liberal	Ernest Blyth (elected 5)	1,477	11.4	+11.4
Liberal	Herbert Hays (elected 4)	956	7.4	−4.8
Liberal	Edward Mulcahy (elected 6)	926	7.1	−8.8
Liberal	Edmund Hingston	522	4.0	+4.0
Liberal	William Connell	292	2.2	+2.2
Liberal	Alfred Stokes	276	2.1	+2.1
Labor	Joseph Lyons (elected 1)	2,812	21.7	+3.8
Labor	Michael O'Keefe (elected 3)	1,245	9.6	+1.8
Labor	Henry McFie	516	4.0	+4.0
Labor	John Heffernan	493	3.8	+3.8
Independent	Norman Cameron	800	6.2	−1.8
Total formal votes		12,946	94.2	−3.4
Informal votes		803	5.8	+3.4
Turnout		13,749	73.1	+6.7
Party total votes
Liberal		7,080	54.7	−1.1
Labor		5,066	39.1	+2.9
Independent	Norman Cameron	800	6.2	−1.8

==== 1913 ====
1913 Tasmanian state election: Wilmot
Party	Candidate	Votes	%	±%
Quota		1,756		
Liberal	Edward Mulcahy (elected 2)	1,961	16.0	−3.7
Liberal	Herbert Hays (elected 3)	1,506	12.3	+0.5
Liberal	Walter Lee (elected 4)	1,456	11.8	−2.2
Liberal	Jonathan Best (elected 5)	1,163	9.5	+0.4
Liberal	Horace Walduck	775	6.3	+6.3
Labor	Joseph Lyons (elected 1)	2,198	17.9	+0.0
Labor	William Shoobridge	1,245	10.1	+10.1
Labor	Michael O'Keefe (elected 6)	1,008	8.2	+3.2
Independent	Norman Cameron	977	8.0	−2.6
Total formal votes		12,289	97.6	+0.9
Informal votes		297	2.4	−0.9
Turnout		12,586	66.4	−4.8
Party total votes
Liberal		6,861	55.8	−10.2
Labor		4,451	36.2	+2.0
Independent	Norman Cameron	977	8.0	−2.6
