= John Fidler =

John Fidler may refer to:

- John Fidler (politician) (1891–1973), Australian politician who served in the Tasmanian House of Assembly.
- John Fidler (rugby union) (born 1948), English rugby union player for Gloucester and England.
