= Percy Best =

Australian politician (1873–1943)

Percival Clarence Best (21 March 1873 – 14 April 1943) was an Australian politician. Born in Westbury, Tasmania, he was elected to the Tasmanian House of Assembly for Wilmot in 1928, representing the Nationalist Party. Defeated in 1931, he returned to politics in 1935 as the Independent member for the Legislative Council seat of Meander, which he held until his death in Hobart in 1943. His son Charles was also an MLC from 1958 to 1971.

Tasmanian Legislative Council
Preceded by Hubert Nichols	Member for Meander; 1935–1943	Succeeded by Elliot Lillico
