= Thomas McKinley =

Australian politician

Thomas Joseph McKinley (19 March 1888 – 8 July 1949) was an Australian politician.

He was born in Maryborough in Victoria. In 1941 he was elected to the Tasmanian House of Assembly as a Labor member for Franklin. He held the seat until his defeat in 1946. McKinley died in Hobart in 1949.
