= Lynda Heaven =

Australian politician

Lynda Heaven MBE

Member of the Tasmanian House of Assembly for Franklin
- In office 9 March 1962 – 2 May 1964
- Preceded by: John Dwyer

Personal details
- Born: Lynda Agnes Victoria Hocking; 12 April 1902 Daylesford, Victoria, Australia
- Died: 3 April 1987 (aged 84)
- Party: Labor Party

Lynda Agnes Victoria Heaven MBE (12 April 1902 – 3 April 1987) was an Australian politician. She was the first female Labor Party member of the Tasmanian House of Assembly, and represented the electorate of Franklin between 1962 and 1964.

She was born Lynda Hocking in Daylesford, Victoria, and on 2 December 1959, she became the first woman to serve on a jury in Tasmania, after amendments to the Jury Act 1899 enacted two years earlier permitted female jurors.

Heaven entered the House of Assembly on 9 March 1962 on a recount following the death of John Dwyer. In fact, the recount following Dwyer's death had elected Brian Crawford to the vacancy, but Heaven successfully challenged Crawford's election on the grounds that he was not resident in Tasmania. She was one of three female candidates for Franklin at the 1964 state election, but was defeated.

Heaven was made a Member of the Order of the British Empire (MBE) in the 1968 Queen's Birthday Honours, for services to the community.
