= Ernest West (politician) =

Australian politician

Ernest Newton West (19 November 1907 – ?) was an Australian politician.

He was born at North Shields in Northumberland, England. In 1941 he was elected to the Tasmanian House of Assembly as a Labor member for Wilmot. He was defeated in 1946.
