= James Bugg =

Australian politician

James Phillip Bugg (26 November 1882 – 7 July 1964) was an Australian politician.

He was born in Somerset in Tasmania. In 1941 he was elected to the Tasmanian House of Assembly as a Labor member for Darwin. He served until his defeat in 1946. Bugg died in Smithton in 1964.
