= Eric Iles =

Australian politician (1927–2023)

Eric Clifton Iles (11 September 1927 – 11 March 2023) was an Australian politician.

He was born in Sorell, Tasmania. In 1966 he was elected to the Tasmanian House of Assembly as a Liberal member for Franklin in a recount following the resignation of Thomas Pearsall. He was defeated at the next election in 1969.
