= Robert Robertson (Australian politician) =

Australian politician

Robert Shorthouse Robertson (31 December 1887 – 26 August 1960) was an Australian politician.

He was born in Hamilton. In 1946 he was elected to the Tasmanian House of Assembly as a Liberal member for Wilmot. He served until his defeat in 1950. Robertson died in Launceston in 1960.
