= Charles Hand =

Australian politician

Charles Henry Hand (21 November 1900 – 3 October 1966) was an Australian politician.

He was born in Hong Kong. In 1948 he was elected to the Tasmanian House of Assembly as a Labor member for Franklin. He held the seat until his defeat in 1956. Hand died in 1966 in Hobart.
