= Charles Best (politician) =

Australian politician

Charles Robinson Best (14 June 1909 – 24 May 1996) was an Australian politician.

He was born in Longford, the son of politician Percy Best. In 1950 he was elected to the Tasmanian House of Assembly as a Liberal member for Wilmot. He held the seat until 1958, when he resigned to run for the Legislative Council seat of Meander as an independent. He won, and held the seat until his defeat in 1971. He died in 1996 in Deloraine.

Best was chosen as provisional state chairman of the revived Country Party in Tasmania in November 1962. He served as the party's de facto leader until resigning for health reasons in April 1964, just before the 1964 Tasmanian state election.

Tasmanian Legislative Council
| Preceded by Elliot Lillico | Member for Meander; 1958–1971 | Succeeded by Jeff Coates |
