= Harry McLoughlin (politician) =

Australian politician

Henry Joseph McLoughlin (27 August 1911 – 18 February 1993) was an Australian politician.

He was born in Hobart. In 1959 he was elected to the Tasmanian House of Assembly as a Labor member for Denison. He served as a minister from 1961 to 1969, when he was defeated.
