= 1959 Tasmanian state election =

State election in Australia

- 2 May 1959

All 35 seats to the House of Assembly
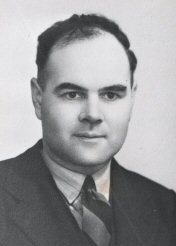

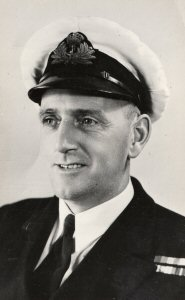
	First party	Second party
Leader	Eric Reece	Tim Jackson
Party	Labor	Liberal
Leader since	26 August 1958	26 June 1956
Leader's seat	Braddon	Franklin
Last election	15 seats	15 seats
Seats won	17 seats	16 seats
Seat change	▲2	▲1
Percentage	44.5%	41.05%
Swing	▼5.77	▼2.54
- Results of the election
Premier before election
Eric Reece
Labor
Resulting Premier
Eric Reece
Labor

The 1959 Tasmanian state election was held on 2 May 1959 in the Australian state of Tasmania to elect 35 members of the Tasmanian House of Assembly. The number of members were increased from this election from 30 to 35. The election used the Hare-Clark proportional representation system — seven members were elected from each of five electorates. This change was at least party due to evidence presented by Dr. George Howatt on the need for seven-seat districts.

The two previous elections had resulted in a parliamentary deadlock due to an even number of seats (30) in the House of Assembly. Prior to the 1959 election, the number of seats was increased to 35.

Robert Cosgrove had retired as Premier of Tasmania, and had been replaced by Eric Reece on 26 August 1958.

== Results ==
The Labor Party won the most seats in the newly expanded House of Assembly, but not enough to govern in a majority as two seats were won by Independents. The 1959 election was the last occasion in which an ungrouped independent (Bill Wedd) won a seat in Tasmania.

Former Labor Treasurer Dr Reg Turnbull won two quotas in his own right as an independent in Bass, representing 5.64% of the statewide result.

Party	Votes	%	+/–	Seats	+/–
Labor	71,535	44.50	▼5.77	17	▲2
Liberal	66,005	41.06	▼2.54	16	▲1
Independents	14,549	9.05	▲6.45	2	▲2
Democratic Labor	8,510	5.29	▲1.82	0	Steady
Communist	144	0.09	▲0.03	0	Steady
Total	160,743	100.00	–	35	–
Valid votes	160,743	94.24			
Invalid/blank votes	9,816	5.76	▲1.57		
Total votes	170,559	100.00	–		
Registered voters/turnout	180,344	94.57	▼0.65		

Popular vote
Labor	44.50%
Liberal	41.05%
Democratic Labor	5.29%
Communist	0.09%
Independents	9.05%

Seats
Labor	48.57%
Liberal	45.71%
Independents	5.71%

== Distribution of votes ==
=== Primary vote by division ===
	Bass	Braddon	Denison	Franklin	Wilmot
Labor Party	31.6%	52.2%	39.5%	46.3%	53.5%
Liberal Party	36.3%	42.4%	39.8%	43.8%	43.2%
Other	32.1%	5.4%	20.7%	10.0%	3.4%

=== Distribution of seats ===
Electorate	Seats won
Bass	
Braddon	
Denison	
Franklin	
Wilmot	

Labor
Liberal
Independent

== See also ==
- Members of the Tasmanian House of Assembly, 1959–1964
- Candidates of the 1959 Tasmanian state election
