= Doug Clark (Australian politician) =

Australian politician

Douglas Frank Clark (27 April 1927 – 4 May 2008) was an Australian politician.

He was born in Hobart. In 1964 he was elected to the Tasmanian House of Assembly as a Liberal member for Franklin. He served as a minister from 1969 to 1972. He was defeated in 1976. He died in Canberra.
