= Peter Pike (Australian politician) =

Australian politician

Peter Percy Fowler Pike (3 November 1879 – 3 September 1949) was an Australian politician.

He was born in Launceston. In 1943 he was elected to the Tasmanian House of Assembly as a Labor member for Wilmot. He was elected Speaker in 1948, serving until his death in Launceston in 1949.
