= John Fidler (politician) =

Australian politician

John Roy Fidler MBE (8 August 1891 – 17 March 1973) was an Australian politician.

He was born in Gladstone, Tasmania. In 1946 he was elected to the Tasmanian House of Assembly as a Liberal member for Darwin. He held the seat until his defeat in 1956. Fidler died in Hobart in 1973.
