= Reg Fisher =

Australian politician (1901–1958)

- Born: 15 June 1901; Oatlands
- Died: 29 December 1958 (aged 57); Oatlands
- Occupation: Politician
- Political party: Labor

Arthur Reginald Fisher (15 June 1901 – 29 December 1958) was an Australian politician.

He was born in Oatlands, Tasmania. In 1956 he was elected to the Tasmanian House of Assembly as a Labor member for Wilmot. He served until his death in 1958.
