= Bill Young (Tasmanian politician) =

Australian politician

Aretas William Overton Young MBE (9 February 1917 – 19 November 2003) was an Australian politician.

He was born in North Adelaide, South Australia. In 1959 he was elected to the Tasmanian House of Assembly as a Liberal member for Franklin. He held the seat until 1969, when he was defeated. Young died in Hobart in 2003.
