= Bert Lacey =

Australian politician

- Lacey in 1970

Senator for Tasmania
- In office 1 July 1965 – 30 June 1971

Member of the Tasmanian House of Assembly for Denison
- In office 27 January 1959 – 2 May 1959
- Preceded by: Alfred White

Personal details
- Born: Robert Herbert Lacey; 12 January 1900 Maryborough, Victoria, Australia
- Died: 2 November 1984 (aged 84) Dynnyrne, Tasmania, Australia
- Party: Labor
- Spouse: Mary Clark (m. 1926)
- Occupation: Labourer; Miner

Robert Herbert Lacey (12 January 1900 – 2 November 1984) was an Australian politician and trade unionist. He was a member of the Australian Labor Party (ALP) and served as a senator for Tasmania from 1965 to 1971. He was the party's state secretary from 1947 to 1964 and also briefly served in the Tasmanian House of Assembly in 1959.

== Early life ==
Lacey was born on 12 January 1900 in Maryborough, Victoria. He was one of six children born to Ellen Eliza (née Finch) and Herbert Edwin Lacey, who worked as a labourer.

Lacey attended state schools in Ballarat. According to his Labor colleague Brian Harradine, he experienced extreme poverty and malnourishment during his childhood, particularly after the death of his mother in 1911. He left school in 1914 to work as a farm labourer. He enlisted in the Australian Imperial Force a few weeks before the armistice of 11 November 1918 and was not called up for overseas service.

After the war's end Lacey worked as a miner in Gaffneys Creek, Matlock and Woods Point. He moved to Tasmania in 1924 and worked at the Golden Gate mine in Mathinna. He spent a period in New Zealand before returning to Tasmania to again work as a miner and logger. Lacey had joined the Australian Workers' Union (AWU) in 1918 and in 1938 was appointed as a paid organiser, based in Ulverstone. He was elected as a state vice-president in 1951 but the Tasmanian executive was dismissed by the AWU federal executive as being unconstitutionally elected. He later served as a vice-president of the Federated Clerks' Union.

== State politics ==
In 1947, Lacey was appointed as the first full-time state secretary of the Labor Party in Tasmania, a position he held until 1964. He was a delegate to a number of ALP conferences, including during the party split of the mid-1950s. Although he was a Catholic and anti-communist like B. A. Santamaria and the Industrial Groups, he remained loyal to the official ALP and resisted pressure to join the Anti-Communist Labor Party.

Lacey first stood for parliament at the 1946 state election, standing unsuccessfully for the Tasmanian House of Assembly in the seat of Darwin. In the lead-up to the election he received severe leg injuries in a motorcycle accident in Devonport. He was hospitalised for four months and the driver of the vehicle which struck him was fined for failing to give way.

Lacey was also an unsuccessful candidate at the 1956 state election, running in Denison. On 27 January 1959, he was declared elected on a countback, replacing Alfred White who had resigned. The parliament was prorogued before Lacey took his seat in the chamber and he was defeated at the 1959 state election a few months later.

== Federal politics ==
Lacey was an unsuccessful candidate for the House of Representatives at the 1954 and 1958 federal elections, losing to Athol Townley in the seat of Denison on both occasions. He was also an unsuccessful candidate for the Senate at the 1955 election.

At the 1964 half-Senate election, Lacey was elected to a six-year term beginning on 1 July 1965. He narrowly defeated incumbent Democratic Labor Party senator George Cole for the final vacancy, reaching the quota by 33 votes. Cole unsuccessfully challenged the result in the Court of Disputed Returns. Lacey was defeated after a single term at the 1970 election, with his term concluding on 30 June 1971. In parliament, he served on the Senate Standing Committee on Orders (1967–1971) and the Senate Select Committee on Air Pollution (1968–1969).

Lacey opposed Australian involvement in the Vietnam War, despite his anti-communism, and noted that North Vietnam had never threatened Australia. He regularly raised the war during question time, including multiple queries about the constitutional basis for Australia's involvement. Lacey was also interested in the rights of prisoners and gaol conditions, having previously been president of a gaol visitation committee. He supported additional funding for prisoners being released from gaol and further government support for criminological research, including the establishment of the Australian Institute of Criminology.

== Personal life ==
In 1926, Lacey married Mary Emmeline Clark, with whom he had four children; a daughter predeceased him. He died on 2 November 1984 at the Sunnyside Nursing Home in Dynnyrne, Tasmania.
