= Max Bound =

Australian trade unionist and activist

- Born: 5 October 1924
- Died: 9 August 2012 (aged 87)
- Political party: Communist Party of Australia

Max Alan Bound (5 October 1924 – 9 August 2012) was an Australian trade unionist and environmental activist.

Bound left school at the age of thirteen and cycled through a variety of jobs as a coalminer, cleaner, tram conductor and labourer before the Communist Party of Australia, seeing his work setting up the Cobblers Club in Devonport, appointed him an unpaid organiser. Bound stood as a Communist for numerous elections and was often the sole Tasmanian to represent the party at federal elections. He was more broadly involved in the union movement, and was a key member of the small group of Tasmanian Trades & Labor Council delegates who opposed the building of the Franklin Dam. During the 1960s he vigorously opposed the Vietnam War and conscription, and around this time completed a Bachelor of Environmental Design at the Tasmanian College of Advanced Education. He was involved in the foundation of the Trade Union Community Research Centre, the Social Economic Ecological and Cultural Alliance, and the Social and Educational Research Concerning Humanity (SEARCH) Foundation. In 2011 he published a book on political economy, Greed or Survival?, based on previously written papers.
