= Thomas McDonald (Australian politician) =

Australian politician

Thomas Raymond McDonald (4 June 1915 – 18 December 1992) was Labor Party Member of the Tasmania House of Assembly for the electorate of Wilmot (Lyons) from 2 May 1959 until his defeat at the election held on 10 May 1969. He was the son of James McDonald and the brother of John Joseph McDonald, both also members of the Tasmanian Parliament. McDonald was a journalist on the Hobart Mercury after leaving Parliament.
