= John Dwyer (soldier) =

Australian politician

John Dwyer VC
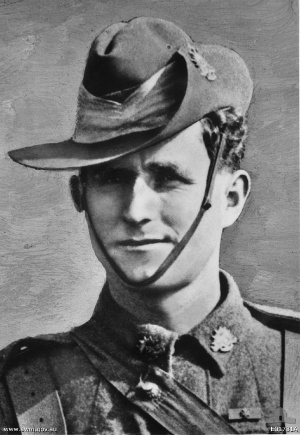
- Sergeant John Dwyer VC, c. 1918

1st Deputy Premier of Tasmania
- In office 26 August 1958 – 12 May 1959
- Premier: Eric Reece
- Succeeded by: Roy Fagan

Minister for Agriculture
- In office 29 June 1948 – 19 September 1961
- Premier: Robert Cosgrove; Eric Reece
- Preceded by: John Madden
- Succeeded by: Alexander Atkins

Speaker of the Tasmanian House of Assembly
- In office 10 February 1942 – 29 June 1948
- Premier: Robert Cosgrove; Edward Brooker
- Preceded by: David O'Keefe
- Succeeded by: Peter Pike

Member of the Tasmanian House of Assembly for Franklin
- In office 9 May 1931 – 17 January 1962

Personal details
- Born: John James Dwyer; 9 March 1890 Port Cygnet, Tasmania
- Died: 17 January 1962 (aged 71) Bruny Island, Tasmania
- Party: Labor Party

Military service
- Allegiance: Australia
- Branch/service: Australian Imperial Force
- Years of service: 1915–18
- Rank: Lieutenant
- Battles/wars: First World War; Gallipoli Campaign; Western Front; Battle of Messines; Battle of Passchendaele
- Awards: Victoria Cross

John James Dwyer, VC (9 March 1890 – 17 January 1962) Commonly known as Jack or JJ, he was a politician and an Australian recipient of the Victoria Cross, the highest award for gallantry in the face of the enemy that can be awarded to British and Commonwealth forces. Elected to the Tasmanian House of Assembly in 1931 representing the Labor Party, Dwyer served as Deputy Premier of Tasmania from August 1958 to May 1959 and remained in office until his death.

When Dwyer was 27 years old he was a sergeant in the 4th Company, Australian Machine Gun Corps, Australian Imperial Force during the First World War. At that time, the following deed took place for which he was later awarded the VC.

On 26 September 1917 at Zonnebeke, Belgium, during the Battle of Polygon Wood, Sergeant Dwyer, in charge of a Vickers machine-gun during an advance, rushed his gun forward to within 30 yards of an enemy machine-gun, fired point blank at it and killed the crew. He then seized the gun and carried it back across shell-swept ground to the Australian front line. On the following day, when the position was being heavily shelled, and his Vickers gun was blown up, he took his team through the enemy barrage and fetched a reserve gun which he put into use in the shortest possible time.

Dwyer later achieved the rank of lieutenant. His Victoria Cross is displayed at the Australian War Memorial.

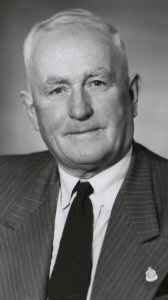
Tasmanian parliamentary library photo, c 1931

Tasmanian House of Assembly
Preceded by David O'Keefe	Speaker of the Tasmanian House of Assembly; 1942–1948	Succeeded by Peter Pike
Political offices
Preceded by John Madden	Minister for Agriculture; 1948–1961	Succeeded by Alexander Atkins
New ministerial post	Deputy Premier of Tasmania; 1958–1959	Succeeded by Roy Fagan
