= Mabel Miller =

Australian lawyer and politician

Dame Mabel Miller DBE
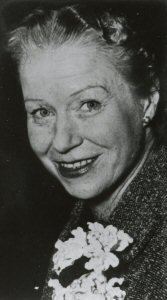

Member of the Tasmanian House of Assembly for Franklin
- In office 19 February 1955 – 2 May 1964

Personal details
- Born: Mabel Flora Goodheart; 30 November 1906 Broken Hill, New South Wales, Australia
- Died: 30 December 1978 (aged 72) New Town, Tasmania, Australia
- Party: Liberal Party
- Spouse: Alan John Richmond Miller
- Education: University of Adelaide
- Profession: Barrister

Military service
- Allegiance: Australia
- Branch/service: Women's Auxiliary Australian Air Force
- Years of service: 1941–1944
- Rank: Staff officer

Dame Mabel Flora Miller, DBE (30 November 1906 – 30 December 1978) was an Australian lawyer and politician. She was the first woman elected to the Hobart City Council and one of the first two women to be elected to the Tasmanian House of Assembly.

== Early life ==
Born in Broken Hill, the second child of South Australian-born parents, Joseph Christian Goodhart, a draper, and Alice Mary Humphries Goodhart, she was raised in Adelaide. She was educated at Girton House Girls' Grammar School and received her LLB from the University of Adelaide in 1927, going on to practice as a barrister in Sydney and London.

She married Alan John Richmond Miller (died 1965) on 24 July 1930 at St. George's Anglican Church, Hobart. They settled in Tasmania and had a daughter.

== Military and community service ==
During World War II, Mabel Miller served in the Women's Auxiliary Australian Air Force (WAAAF); from 1941 to 1944 she was stationed on airbases around Australia. After the war she was active in the Australian Red Cross Society, the Queen Alexandra Hospital, and the Mary Ogilvy Homes Society. She served as president of the National Council of Women of Tasmania from 1952 to 1954.

== Political career ==
Miller decided to enter local politics when she heard there was mismanagement occurring in the Hobart City Council. She was elected to the council in 1952; she spent 20 years on the council her first sitting ended in 1955 when she was elected to the House of Assembly in 1955 as the member for Franklin. Amelia Best was also elected in 1955. She remained in parliament until 1964. After her time in parliament she returned to the council, serving as deputy mayor from 1964 to 1970; she unsuccessfully stood for mayor in 1970, and resigned in 1972.

In 1967 she was the Australian representative on the United Nations' Status of Women Commission, and an Australian delegate to the General Assembly of the United Nations.

== Damehood and recognition ==
Miller was appointed Dame Commander of the Order of the British Empire for "distinguished public service" on 1 January 1967.

In 2009 Miller was posthumously inducted to the Tasmanian Honour Roll of Women for service to Government and to the Community.

== Death ==
Dame Mabel Miller died on 30 December 1978, in a New Town, Tasmania nursing home, aged 72, from undisclosed causes, and was cremated.
