= William Anderson (Tasmanian politician) =

Scottish-born Australian politician

William Anderson (1904 – 22 September 1990) was a Scottish-born Australian politician.

He was elected to the Tasmanian House of Assembly in 1964 as a Labor member for Wilmot. He served until his defeat in 1972.
