= Brian Crawford (politician) =

Australian politician

Brian Peter Crawford (8 June 1926 – 30 July 2004) was an Australian politician. Born in Hobart, he was elected to the Tasmanian House of Assembly in 1956 as a Labor member for Franklin. He was defeated in 1959.
