= Bob Ingamells =

Australian politician

Bob Ingamells OBE

21st Speaker of the Tasmanian House of Assembly
- In office 2 May 1959 – 11 December 1976
- Preceded by: John Madden
- Succeeded by: Eric Barnard

Member of the Tasmanian House of Assembly for Wilmot
- In office 2 May 1959 – 11 December 1976

Personal details
- Born: Christopher Robert Ingamells; 9 August 1914 Westbury, Tasmania, Australia
- Died: 27 October 1986 (aged 72) Launceston, Tasmania, Australia
- Party: Liberal

Christopher Robert Ingamells OBE (9 August 1914 – 27 October 1986) was an Australian politician.

He was born in Westbury. In 1959 he was elected to the Tasmanian House of Assembly as a Liberal member for Wilmot. He served as Speaker from 1969 to 1972. He was defeated in 1976. Ingamells died in Launceston.
