= Reg Turnbull =

Australian politician (1908 – 2006)

The Honourable Dr Reg Turnbull
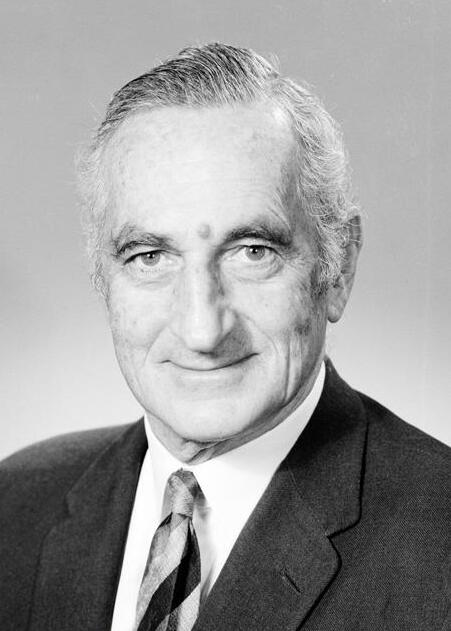

Leader of the Australia Party
- In office 12 August 1969 – 1 February 1970

Senator for Tasmania
- In office 1 July 1962 – 11 April 1974
- Preceded by: Robert Wardlaw
- Succeeded by: Don Grimes

Member of the Tasmanian Parliament for Bass
- In office 23 November 1946 – 30 October 1961
- Preceded by: John Quintal
- Succeeded by: Wallace Fraser

Personal details
- Born: 21 February 1908 Shanghai, China
- Died: 17 July 2006 (aged 98) Melbourne, Victoria, Australia
- Party: Labor (to 1959); Independent (1959–69); Australia Party (1969–70); Independent (1970–74)
- Spouses: Elizabeth Ffrost (m. 1930; died 1986) Nell Ramsay (m. 1987)
- Education: University of Melbourne
- Profession: Medical doctor
- Nickname: Spot

Military service
- Allegiance: Australia
- Branch/service: Australian Imperial Force
- Years of service: 1942–1944
- Rank: Major
- Unit: 2/12th Field Ambulance

Reginald John David "Spot" Turnbull (21 February 1908 – 17 July 2006) was an Australian politician. He served as a Senator for Tasmania from 1962 to 1974 and was a member of the Tasmanian House of Assembly from 1946 to 1961.

Turnbull was born in China to Australian parents and returned to Australia at a young age. He studied medicine at the University of Melbourne and began working as a general practitioner in Tasmania in the 1930s. He served as a military physician during World War II. Turnbull began his political career in the Australian Labor Party (ALP). He was elected to state parliament in 1946 and was appointed minister for health in 1948, also becoming state treasurer in 1956. He resigned from the ALP in 1959 after falling out with Premier Eric Reece and subsequently won re-election as an independent.

Turnbull was elected to the Senate at the 1961 federal election and was re-elected in 1967, attaining a high profile as an independent crossbencher sharing the balance of power. In 1969 Turnbull accepted leadership of the newly formed Australia Party, a successor to the Australian Reform Movement. The party enjoyed limited success at the 1969 election and he resigned from the party in 1970 to return to his independent status. He retired from politics at the 1974 election and returned to his medical practice.

== Early life ==
Turnbull was born on 21 February 1908 in Shanghai, China, the son of Bertha (née Widler) and William John Turnbull. His mother was born in Singapore, and his father was an Australian journalist working on the North China Daily News.

Turnbull's father died when he was a boy and his mother remarried to Enos Soren Thellefsen, a Danish diplomat in the Shanghai International Settlement. The family returned to Australia in 1918 when he was ten years old. He began his schooling at Jewell's Private Day Boarding School in Shanghai, before completing his secondary education in Australia at Wesley College, Melbourne. At Wesley he was a classmate of future prime minister and parliamentary colleague Harold Holt. He was nicknamed "Spot" from a young age due to a prominent mole on his forehead.

== Medical career ==
Turnbull commenced studying medicine at the University of Melbourne in 1928 and graduated MBBS in 1933. He undertook his residency in Queensland at the Brisbane General Hospital, returning to Melbourne in 1936 and then establishing a general practice in Launceston, Tasmania. In 1942, Turnbull enlisted in the Australian Imperial Force (AIF), having previously spent six years in the Melbourne University Regiment. He served with the 2/12th Field Ambulance in Tasmania, Queensland and the Northern Territory, being discharged in 1944 with the rank of major.

Turnbull continued to practise medicine throughout his subsequent political career. He became a Fellow of the Royal Australian College of General Practitioners. In September 1975, he was deregistered by the Medical Council of Tasmania on the grounds that he had engaged in professional misconduct. A 17-year-old girl alleged that Turnbull had "interfered with her" during an examination in Devonport in March 1975. No charges were laid against Turnbull and he denied the allegations, stating he was the victim of "a set-up job". He was also removed from the medical register in New South Wales, and took unsuccessful legal action against the New South Wales Medical Board to have his name reinstated. He was eventually reinstated in December 1976 and ran a practice at George Town until his retirement in 1986.

== Politics ==
=== State politics ===
Turnbull became involved in politics through his advocacy for compulsory tuberculosis screening, which the Australian Labor Party (ALP) supported. He was elected to the Tasmanian House of Assembly as an ALP candidate at the 1946 state election, topping the poll in the seat of Bass.

In 1948, Turnbull was appointed minister for health in the government of Robert Cosgrove, a position he would hold for over a decade. He was additionally appointed state treasurer in October 1956, serving under Cosgrove and his successor Eric Reece. As health minister, Turnbull introduced a number of initiatives including tuberculosis screening, anti-cancer clinics and subsidised pap tests, and recruited general practitioners from overseas to fill a shortage in regional areas.

Turnbull resigned from cabinet in June 1958 after being charged with accepting a bribe from George Fitzpatrick, a Sydney businessman, in relation to a lotteries licence. He denied the allegations and stated that Fitzpatrick had in fact offered to bribe him, which he reported to police. He was found not guilty of corruption in October 1958, and returned to his prior portfolios.

In April 1959, Turnbull dramatically fell out with Reece over differences in government policy, culminating in him walking out of two cabinet meetings. The ALP caucus unanimously voted for Turnbull to be removed from the ministry, but he refused to resign and Reece had to instruct the administrator, Stanley Burbury, to revoke Turnbull's commission. Reece subsequently announced that he would call an early election. Turnbull chose to recontest Bass as an independent, resulting in his automatic expulsion from the Labor Party. He was re-elected with a personal vote of 28 percent, a record for an independent. He and fellow independent Bill Wedd held the balance of power in the House of Assembly.

=== Federal politics ===
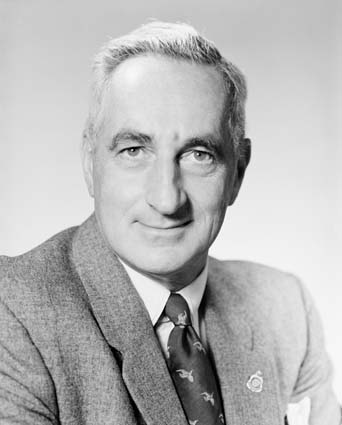
Turnbull in 1962

Turnbull resigned from state parliament on 30 October 1961 to stand for the Senate at the 1961 federal election. He was elected to a six-year term beginning on 1 July 1962 and won re-election to a further six-year term at the 1967 election.

Though he was elected Senator each time as an independent, he briefly served as leader of the Australia Party from August 1969 to January 1970. Turnbull also served as Mayor of Launceston from 1964 to 1965.

Turnbull played a key role in the VIP aircraft affair of 1966, with his questions on the Holt government's use of RAAF aircraft prompting revelations that prime minister Harold Holt had misled parliament.

Turnbull did not recontest his seat at the 1974 federal election, stating he "just didn’t like the atmosphere" in parliament. The following year, he announced plans to contest the 1975 Bass by-election, prompted by the resignation of deputy prime minister Lance Barnard. However, he ultimately decided not to contest the seat, on the grounds that he believed a double dissolution was likely and he did not have the funds to run multiple campaigns in a short amount of time. He was proven correct as the June by-election was followed 6 months later in December by the double dissolution 1975 Australian federal election caused by the 1975 Australian constitutional crisis. Turnbull did not nominate, still in the middle of the deregistration fight with the Medical Council of Tasmania, which lasted until his reinstatement in December 1976. It was the end of his political career.

== Personal life ==
In 1929, Turnbull married Elizabeth Ffrost, with whom he had three children. He was widowed in the mid-1980s and remarried in 1987 to Nell Fullerton (née Ramsay), the daughter of surgeon John Ramsay. He died in Melbourne on 17 July 2006 at the age of 98.
