= Wallace Fraser =

Australian politician

Wallace Harcourt Fraser was an Australian politician.

In 1961 he was elected to the Tasmanian House of Assembly as a Labor member for Bass in a recount following Reg Turnbull's resignation to contest the Senate. He was defeated in 1969.
