= Bill Hodgman =

Australian politician (1909–1997)

Bill Hodgman OBE QC
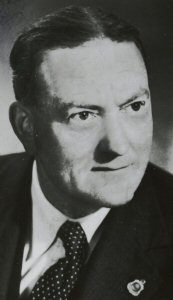

President of the Tasmanian Legislative Council
- In office 9 June 1981 – 28 May 1983
- Preceded by: Charles Fenton
- Succeeded by: Harry Braid

Personal details
- Born: William Clark Hodgman; 14 May 1909 Hobart
- Died: 3 May 1997 (aged 87)
- Party: Independent (1959–1997)
- Other political affiliations: Liberal (1955–1959)

William Clark Hodgman OBE QC (14 May 1909 – 3 May 1997) was a Tasmanian politician. He served as a Member of the House of Assembly for Denison from 1955 to 1964 and a Member of the Legislative Council from 1971 to 1983. He was President of the Tasmanian Legislative Council from 1981 to 1983. Originally a Liberal, he became an independent in 1959.

William Clark Hodgman was the father of politicians Michael Hodgman and Peter Hodgman, and the grandfather of the 45th Premier of Tasmania and Australian High Commissioner to Singapore, Will Hodgman.

== See also ==
- Hodgman family

Tasmanian Legislative Council
| Preceded by Charles Fenton | President of the Tasmanian Legislative Council; 1981–1983 | Succeeded by Harry Braid |
| Preceded by Louis Shoobridge | Member for Queenborough; 1971–1983 | Succeeded by John Stopp |
