= Amelia Best =

Australian politician

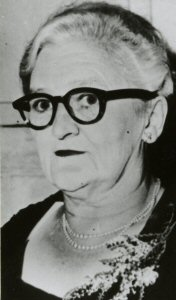
Amelia Best

Amelia Martha (Millie) Best MBE (29 April 1900 – 14 November 1979) was one of the first two women elected to the Tasmanian House of Assembly.

Best was born in Lower Barrington, Tasmania, Australia. She ran an arts and crafts business in Launceston and was involved in the Voluntary Aid Detachment (VAD) Canteen Services during World War II.

She was elected to the House of Assembly representing the Liberal Party in the seat of Wilmot in 1955. She lost her seat in 1956, was re-elected in 1958 and lost her seat again in 1959.
