= William McNeil =

Australian politician

William Donald McNeil (21 January 1906 – 16 May 1964) was an Australian politician.

He was born in Adelaide. In 1959 he was elected to the Tasmanian House of Assembly as a Labor member for Wilmot in a countback following the death of Reg Fisher. Re-elected in 1959, he was appointed a minister in 1961. Defeated at the election on 2 May 1964, he died fourteen days later at St Marys.
