= Eric Howroyd =

Australian politician

Eric Richard Aldred Howroyd (14 April 1900 – 13 June 1980) was an Australian politician.

The son of Charles Howroyd, Eric was born in Launceston. He was elected to the Tasmanian House of Assembly in 1937 for Bass, and was government whip from 1937 to 1943. He was defeated in 1950 and returned in 1958 following a recount in Denison after Robert Cosgrove's resignation. He was defeated again in 1959. He served as a minister during his term.
