= Carrol Bramich =

Australian politician (1893–1964)

Carrol Athelstone Bramich (30 October 1893 – 1 October 1964) was an Australian politician. He was a member of the Tasmanian House of Assembly from 1946 to 1964, representing the electorate of Darwin for both the Labor Party (1946–1956) and the Liberal Party (1956–1964). He served as a minister under Labor Premier Robert Cosgrove until his sudden floor-crossing defection in 1956.

Bramich was promoted to Cabinet in November 1946 and was appointed Assistant Minister for Education and Transport, but was defeated in a caucus election for a reshuffle several months later. He returned to Cabinet in May 1948 following the defeat of Rowland Worsley, and was assigned Worsley's former role of Minister for Forests. He again lost his position in a caucus election, and again regained it after another vacancy in April 1949, being appointed Minister for Housing.

Bramich suddenly resigned as Minister for Housing and from the Labor Party on 11 September 1956, costing the Labor government its majority in parliament. He claimed that his recommendations were being ignored and his decisions set aside. He was also facing party censure for having, while Acting Minister for Health, made a public statement claiming that his colleagues had "deliberately frustrated" his efforts to reconstitute a country hospitals board. Bramich initially claimed that he would sit on the crossbenches, but defected to the Liberal Party later that day. An attempt to install a Liberal government mid-term was only thwarted when Premier Robert Cosgrove called an early election, following a constitutional crisis around whether the Governor would allow him to dissolve parliament. Bramich had been expected to lose his seat at the subsequent election, but instead topped the Liberal poll in his seat.

Bramich retired from politics in 1964 and died later that year.
