= Charley Aylett =

Australian politician

Speaker of the Tasmanian House of Assembly
- In office 2 June 1959 – 1 May 1964
- Preceded by: Kevin Lyons
- Succeeded by: John Madden

Member of the Tasmanian House of Assembly
- In office 23 November 1946 – 2 May 1964
- Constituency: Darwin (1946–1959); Denison (1959–1964)

Personal details
- Born: 5 October 1913 Waratah, Tasmania, Australia
- Died: 11 September 1966 (aged 52) Double Creek, Tasmania, Australia
- Party: Labor (to 1964); Independent (from 1964)
- Relations: Bill Aylett (brother)
- Occupation: Publican

Charley Bischoff "Tinny" Aylett (5 October 1913 – 11 September 1966) was an Australian politician. He served in the Tasmanian House of Assembly from 1946 to 1964, including as Speaker of the House from 1959 to 1964. During his political career he simultaneously ran a pub in Hobart.

Aylett was born in Waratah, Tasmania, as one of twelve children. His older brother Bill Aylett was a senator. In 1946 he was elected to the House of Assembly as a Labor member for Darwin. He was promoted to the ministry in December 1947 with responsibility for housing, initially as an honorary minister and then as Minister for Housing. He resigned from cabinet in April 1949 after a select committee found that he had misled parliament about the amount of materials held by the State Housing Authority. Aylett was a talented field hockey player and was playing at state level as late as 1952, when he represented Tasmania at the national championships in Perth.

After being forced out of the ministry Aylett served as Chair of Committees from 1950 to 1955. In 1959 he transferred to the seat of Denison, after taking up the licence of a pub in Hobart. After the election he was elected to the speakership. In 1961, Opposition Leader Angus Bethune moved a motion of no confidence in the speaker, over allegations of misconduct relating to the Sydney to Hobart Yacht Race. Bethune claimed that Aylett had entertained yachtsmen at "an alcoholic party" at Parliament House, had pulled beer in his pub while wearing the speaker's robes, had frequently been absent from the speaker's chair, and had been drunk while presiding over parliament. He denied the accusations, stating "every other member has fallen asleep in the House at one stage or another", and the motion failed. In March 1962, Aylett was fined £30 for serving alcohol in his pub during prohibited hours. The controversies led the ALP caucus to press him to resign, which he resisted. In December 1963, he lost the party's endorsement for the 1964 state election. He remained as Speaker, but subsequently became an independent and lost his seat at the election. He died in 1966 in Double Creek.
