= Jack Breheny =

Australian politician (1910–2009)

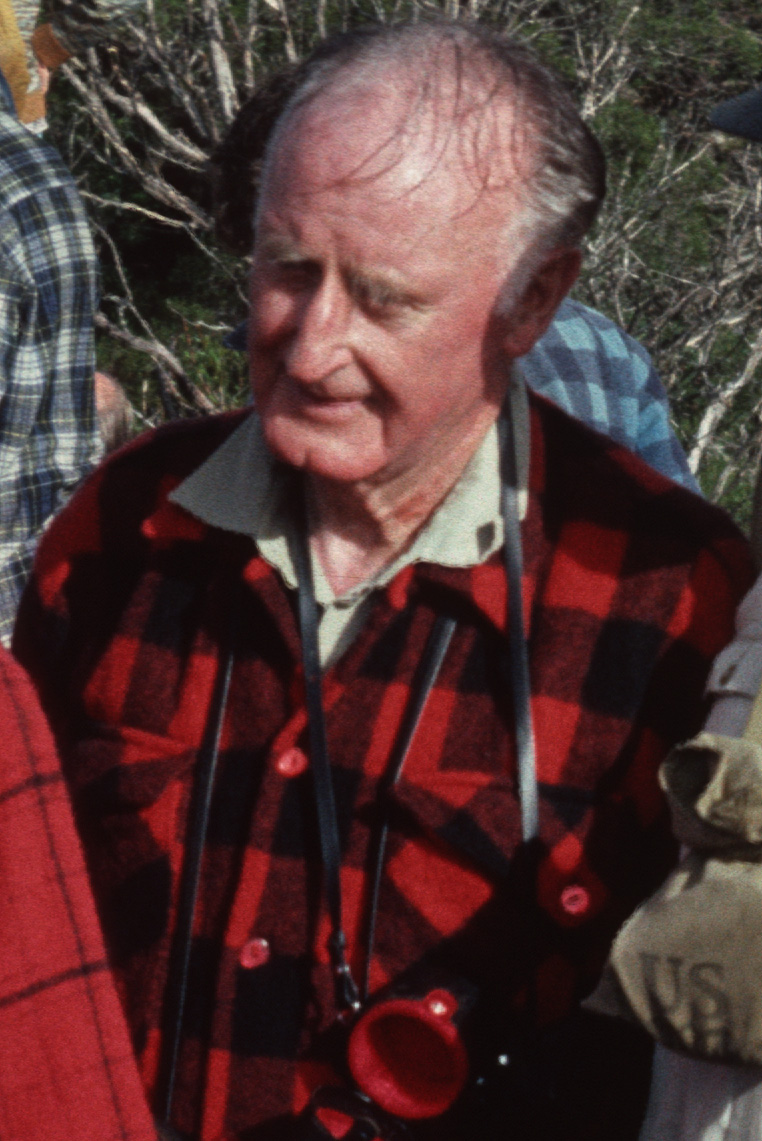
Jack Breheny, 25 May 1980

John Gerald Breheny (17 May 1910 – 11 February 2009) was an Australian politician.

He was born in Toowoomba in Queensland. Pre-war he worked in a bank. In 1940 he enlisted in the AIF, and in 1942 was captured on Java and was a prisoner of war of the Japanese, and his time included working on the notorious Burma-Thai railway. In 1951 he was elected to the Tasmanian House of Assembly as a Liberal member for Darwin (later Braddon) in a recount following Jack Chamberlain's resignation. He served until his defeat in 1972, and was then an Ulverstone councillor from 1976 to 1991. During his time on Ulverstone council, he was noted for publicly stating that "gay community are no better than Saddam Hussein". He died at Ulverstone in 2009.
