= Sydney Ward (politician) =

Australian politician

Sydney Victor Ward (20 March 1903 – 27 May 1988) was an Australian politician.

He was born in Woodbridge. In 1956 he was elected to the Tasmanian House of Assembly as a Labor member for Braddon. He was a minister from 1961 to 1969, and served in the House until his retirement in 1976.
