= Douglas Cashion =

Australian politician

Douglas Cashion AO

Member of the Tasmanian House of Assembly for Wilmot
- In office 19 September 1949 – 22 April 1972
- Preceded by: Peter Pike
- Succeeded by: Michael Polley

Personal details
- Born: 23 January 1907 Bothwell, Tasmania, Australia
- Died: 27 September 2004 (aged 97) Hobart, Tasmania, Australia
- Party: Labor Party

Douglas Alfred Cashion AO (23 January 1907 – 27 September 2004) was an Australian politician who served in the Tasmanian House of Assembly for the seat of Wilmot between 1949 and 1972.

== Early life ==
He was born in Bothwell in 1907.

== Political career ==
He was first elected to the Bothwell Council in 1942, serving as councillor until 1959, including as Warden for eight and a half years.

In 1949 he was elected to the Tasmanian House of Assembly as a Labor member for Wilmot in a recount following Peter Pike's death. After Labors victory in 1956, he was appointed Minister for Transport under Premier Robert Cosgrove, where he served for two years, until Cosgroves resignation in 1958. He was then appointed Minister for Land and Works under Premier Eric Reece, where he served until Labor's loss at the 1969 election. His work as Minister was noted for helping seal many country roads throughout the state.

He along with four other men were charged over a land conspiracy in 1971. Although the charges were dropped the following year.

He continued to hold his seat until he was defeated at the 1972 election.

== Personal life and death ==
Cashion married his wife Laura in 1932 with whom he had six children.

He was awarded an AO in 1978. He died in Hobart in 2004 at the age of 97.
