= Bert Bessell =

Australian politician

Leonard Hubert Bessell (6 February 1917 – 13 July 1981) was an Australian politician.

He was born in Whitemore, Tasmania. In 1956 he was elected to the Tasmanian House of Assembly as a Liberal member for Wilmot. He was Opposition Whip from 1966 to 1969 and a government minister from 1969 to 1972. He served until his defeat in 1976. Bessell died on July 13 in Exeter.
