= Bill Beattie (Australian politician) =

Australian politician

Eric William Beattie CBE (13 December 1912–19 April 2006) was an Australian politician.

He was born in Scottsdale, Tasmania. In 1946, he was elected to the Tasmanian House of Assembly as a Liberal member for Bass. Defeated in 1950, he returned to the House in 1954 after a recount to fill the vacancy caused by John Orchard's resignation. He served as a minister from 1969 to 1972, and retired from politics in 1979. He died in Scottsdale in 2006.
