= Roy Fagan =

Australian politician

2nd Deputy Premier of Tasmania
- In office 12 May 1959 – 26 May 1969
- Premier: Eric Reece
- Preceded by: John James Dwyer
- Succeeded by: Kevin Lyons

Attorney-General of Tasmania
- In office 10 December 1946 – 19 July 1958
- Premier: Robert Cosgrove
- Preceded by: Eric Ogilvie
- Succeeded by: Bill Neilson
- In office 12 May 1959 – 26 May 1969
- Premier: Eric Reece
- Preceded by: Eric Reece
- Succeeded by: Max Bingham

Personal details
- Born: Roy Frederick Fagan; 28 December 1905 Waratah, Tasmania, Australia
- Died: 18 July 1990 (aged 84) Hobart, Tasmania, Australia
- Party: Labor Party
- Spouse(s): Gertrude Estelle Cooney (1925–1946; her death); Mavis Isabel Smith (1947–1990; his death)
- Children: Three sons, one daughter
- Education: University of Tasmania
- Profession: Barrister and solicitor

Roy Frederick Fagan (28 December 1905 – 18 July 1990) was an Australian Labor Party politician, who was Deputy Premier of Tasmania from 1959 to 1969.

== Early life ==
Fagan was born in Waratah, Tasmania in 1905, the eldest son of James Fagan and Annie Theresa Breheney. His younger siblings were two brothers, Kevin and Vincent, and two sisters, Nancy and Sheila. His Roman Catholic mother sent him to St Virgil's College in Hobart to be schooled, although his Catholicism lapsed once he moved out of his parents' home and he was later known to be an agnostic who did not attend Mass.

On leaving school, Fagan joined the staff of the Commonwealth Bank where he worked until 1929, when he resigned to attend university.

== Education and legal career ==
In 1930, Fagan commenced studies for a law degree at the University of Tasmania. In 1931, he was articled to the firm Gatenby, Johnson & Walker, and in May 1934 he graduated and was admitted to the Bachelor of Laws (LLB). During his studies, he had taken a keen interest in all aspects of university life, and was heavily involved with the Tasmania University Union, serving as the body's president for three years. He was admitted to the Bar in August 1934, after what The Mercury newspaper called a "brilliant university career". Fagan also completed a Bachelor of Arts and graduated in May 1935.

== Political career ==
Fagan was asked by the Premier of Tasmania, Robert Cosgrove, to stand for the seat of Wilmot at the 1946 Tasmanian state election. Immediately following declaration of his election, Fagan was appointed Attorney-General in Cosgrove's cabinet.

As attorney-general, Fagan played a key role in the abolition of capital punishment in Tasmania. He commuted 20 death sentences and introduced legislation to abolish the death penalty 12 times before it was eventually passed.

== Personal life ==
On 8 December 1925, aged 19, Fagan married Estelle Cooney, a shop assistant, in Wynyard. Cooney was pregnant at the time of their marriage, but did not live with Fagan between the time of the daughter's birth or afterwards. Fagan, although he remained married to Estelle, from the early 1930s was in a domestic relationship with fellow university student Mavis Smith. When Estelle died in 1946, Fagan married Smith at a Catholic church in Bellerive on 28 January 1947. They had three sons.

In his later years, Fagan suffered from advanced Alzheimer's disease and died at the age of 84 in Hobart in 1990. The Roy Fagan Centre is a mental health facility in Lenah Valley, Hobart dedicated to older persons with psychiatric illness and/or cognitive impairment, and is named after him.

Political offices
Preceded by Eric Ogilvie	Attorney-General of Tasmania; 1946–1958	Succeeded by Bill Neilson
Preceded by Eric Reece	Attorney-General of Tasmania; 1959–1969	Succeeded by Max Bingham
Preceded by John James Dwyer	Deputy Premier of Tasmania; 1959–1969	Succeeded by John James Dwyer
