= Bill Neilson =

Australian politician

The Honourable Bill Neilson AC
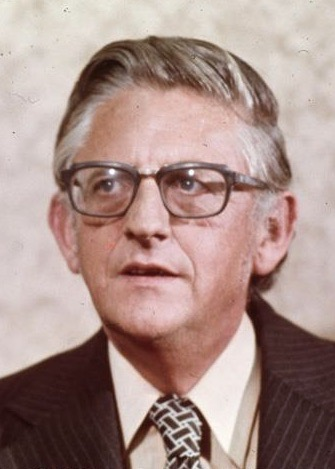
- Neilson in 1975

34th Premier of Tasmania
- In office 31 March 1975 – 1 December 1977
- Deputy: Doug Lowe
- Preceded by: Eric Reece
- Succeeded by: Doug Lowe
- Constituency: Franklin

Personal details
- Born: 27 August 1925 Hobart, Tasmania, Australia
- Died: 9 November 1989 (aged 64) Hobart, Tasmania, Australia
- Party: Labor Party
- Spouse: Jill Benjamin
- Occupation: Post delivery man

William Arthur Neilson AC (27 August 1925 – 9 November 1989) was Premier of Tasmania from 1975 to 1977.

Born in Hobart, and educated at Ogilvie High School, Neilson became a postman before entering politics. He married Jill Benjamin, daughter of Phyllis Benjamin, in Melbourne in 1949. They had one son Andrew and three daughters, Christine, Carol and Robin.

== Political career ==
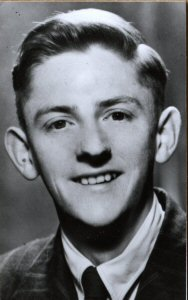
Neilson in 1946.

Neilson was elected to the Tasmanian House of Assembly on 23 November 1946 at the age of 21, representing the Labor Party (ALP). For many years he was not only the youngest MHA in Tasmania, but also the youngest person to be elected to any Australian parliament.

He held various cabinet offices, including those of Minister for Tourism and Attorney-General. For over a decade (1958–1969), and again 1972–1974, he was Minister for Education. He was made Attorney-General again on 12 April 1974, and five days later was also made Deputy Premier, Police Minister and Environment Minister.

When the Premier Eric Reece was required to retire due to his age, Neilson was elected Tasmanian Leader of the ALP and Premier of Tasmania, on 31 March 1975. The following year Neilson's government was re-elected, narrowly defeating (by just one seat) the Liberal Party led by Sir Max Bingham; but towards the end of his tenure, he suffered from nervous exhaustion. He resigned as Premier, and from Parliament, on 1 December 1977.

After his term as premier, Neilson accepted the position as Agent-General for Tasmania in London, but soon his successor in the premiership, Doug Lowe, abolished the post on cost-cutting grounds. In the 1980s, Nielson wrote as a theatre critic for The Mercury newspaper in Hobart. He died of cancer in November 1989 at the age of 64.

Political offices
Preceded by Eric Reece	Premier of Tasmania; 1975–1977	Succeeded by Doug Lowe
Party political offices
Preceded by Eric Reece	Leader of the Labor Party in Tasmania; 1975–1977	Succeeded by Doug Lowe
