= Alexander Atkins =

Australian politician

Alexander Charles Atkins (29 January 1885 – 8 March 1978) was an Australian politician.

He was born in Hobart. In 1946 he was elected to the Tasmanian House of Assembly as a Labor member for Bass. He was defeated in 1948 but returned to the House in 1956. He was a minister from 1961 to 1969, and retired from politics in 1972. He died in Launceston.
