= Angus Bethune (politician) =

Australian politician

The Honourable Sir Angus Bethune
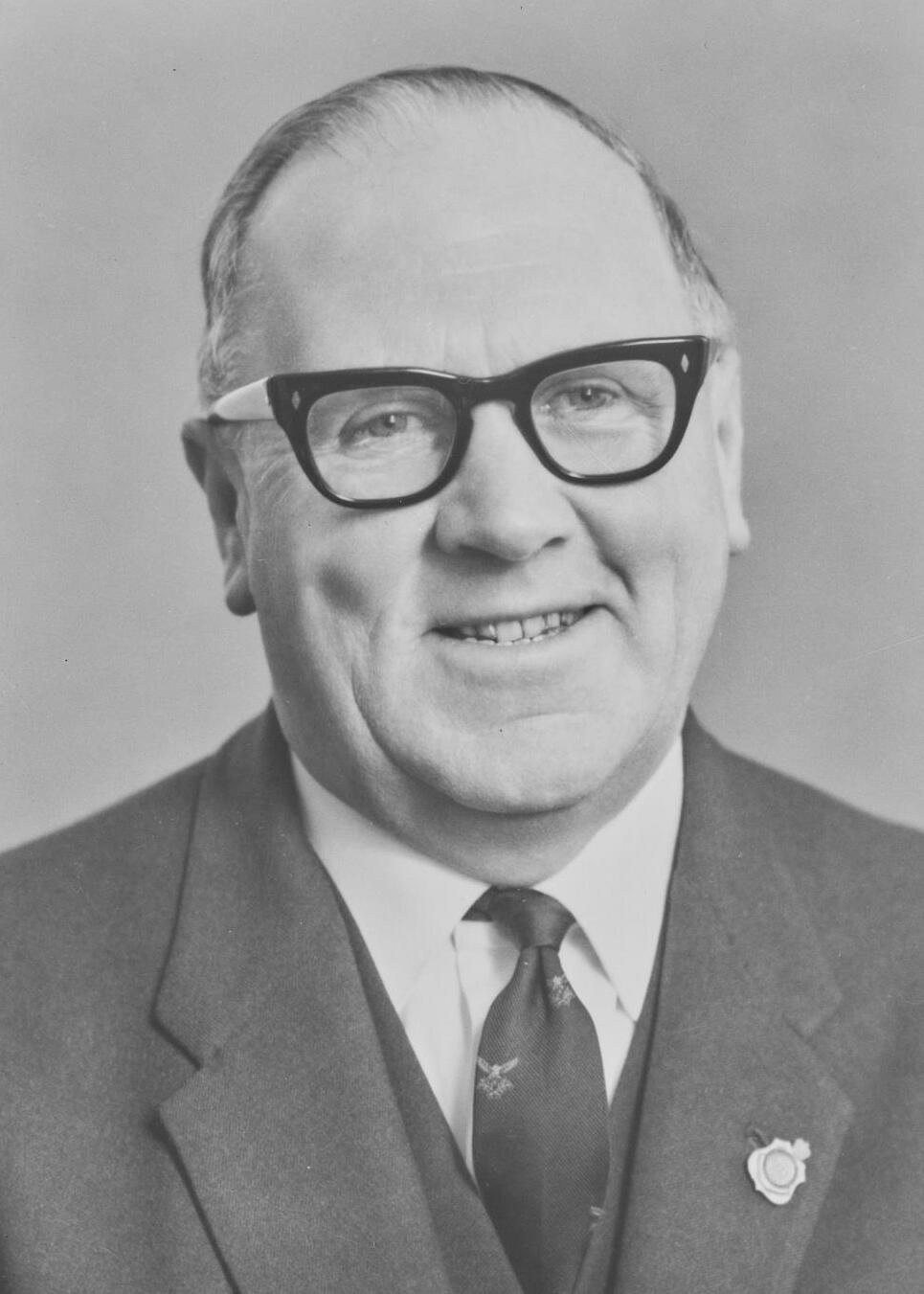
- Bethune in 1971

33rd Premier of Tasmania
- In office 26 May 1969 – 3 May 1972
- Deputy: Kevin Lyons
- Preceded by: Eric Reece
- Succeeded by: Eric Reece

Treasurer of Tasmania
- In office 26 May 1969 – 3 May 1972
- Premier: Angus Bethune
- Preceded by: Eric Reece
- Succeeded by: Eric Reece

35th Leader of the Opposition of Tasmania
- In office 19 March 1960 – 27 May 1969
- Premier: Eric Reece
- Preceded by: Tim Jackson
- Succeeded by: Eric Reece

Leader of the Liberal Party of Tasmania
- In office 1960–1972
- Preceded by: Tim Jackson
- Succeeded by: Max Bingham

Personal details
- Born: 10 September 1908 Sheffield, Tasmania, Australia
- Died: 22 August 2004 (aged 95) Hobart, Tasmania, Australia
- Party: Liberal Party
- Spouse: Alexandra Pritchard (m. 1938)

Military service
- Allegiance: Australia
- Branch/service: Royal Australian Air Force
- Years of service: 1940–1948
- Rank: Warrant Officer

Sir Walter Angus Bethune (10 September 1908 – 22 August 2004) was an Australian politician and member of the Tasmanian House of Assembly. He was Premier of Tasmania from 26 May 1969 to 3 May 1972.

== Early life ==
Bethune was born in Sheffield, Tasmania, and was educated at Launceston Grammar School and The Hutchins School in Hobart. Before entering politics, Bethune worked as a jackaroo. On 15 August 1940, during World War II, he enlisted as an airman and Warrant Officer in the Royal Australian Air Force. He married Alix (Alexandra) Perronet Pritchard of Cluny, Ouse on 30 January 1936.

== Political career ==
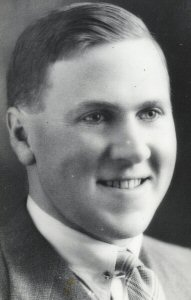
Bethune c. 1946

Bethune was elected to the Tasmanian House of Assembly at the 1946 general election on 23 November 1946, representing the seat of Wilmot (now Lyons) for the newly formed Liberal Party. On 19 March 1960, Bethune became Leader of the Opposition when the leader of the Liberal Party, Tim Jackson resigned in protest at party disunity and a lack of support for his leadership.

On 7 September 1966, Kevin Lyons resigned from the state Liberal Party after a dispute over preselection, and on 15 October formed the Centre Party. In 1969, Lyons held the balance of power, and offered his support to Bethune to form government with himself as deputy premier. Bethune accepted. This forced Labor premier Eric Reece to resign on 26 May, making Bethune the first non-Labor premier of Tasmania in 35 years, and the first to hold the post since the main non-Labor party in Tasmania adopted the Liberal banner in 1946. He also served as his own treasurer.

During his term as premier, Bethune introduced a number of important initiatives, although he had pledged to avoid "revolutionary changes". Bethune's government introduced random breath tests to tackle drink driving, made the wearing of seatbelts compulsory, set up the Tasmania Parks and Wildlife Service, built more schools and tightened state finances.

Bethune was instrumental in the establishment of a Hansard service for the Tasmanian parliament, although he was no longer premier by the time the system was introduced. Kevin Lyons had lost a vote to introduce Hansard in 1960, and with the Bethune-Lyons coalition in power in 1969, Bethune sought a report into the feasibility of such a transcription service. The report was not completed until 1973, but Hansard was considered by Bethune's successors Eric Reece and Doug Lowe until finally being implemented in 1979.

In 1972, Kevin Lyons dissolved the coalition between the Centre and Liberal parties, and was highly critical of Bethune. Bethune was forced to the polls, and the instability in his government saw him lose power in the election on a three-seat swing. Labor won a clear majority, and Reece returned as premier.

== After politics ==
Bethune retired from politics on 30 June 1975, and later joined forces with his former rival, Eric Reece, to back the Franklin Dam.

Sir Angus died after a short illness on 22 August 2004 in Hobart, aged 95. He was accorded a state funeral which was held on 27 August.

== Honours ==
Bethune was made Knight Bachelor on 16 June 1979 in recognition of service to the Parliament of Tasmania. He was also awarded a Centenary Medal in 2001.

Political offices
Preceded by Tim Jackson	Leader of the Opposition in Tasmania; 1960–1969	Succeeded by Eric Reece
Preceded by Eric Reece	Premier of Tasmania; 1969–1972	Succeeded by Eric Reece
