= Eric Reece =

Australian politician

The Honourable Eric Reece AC
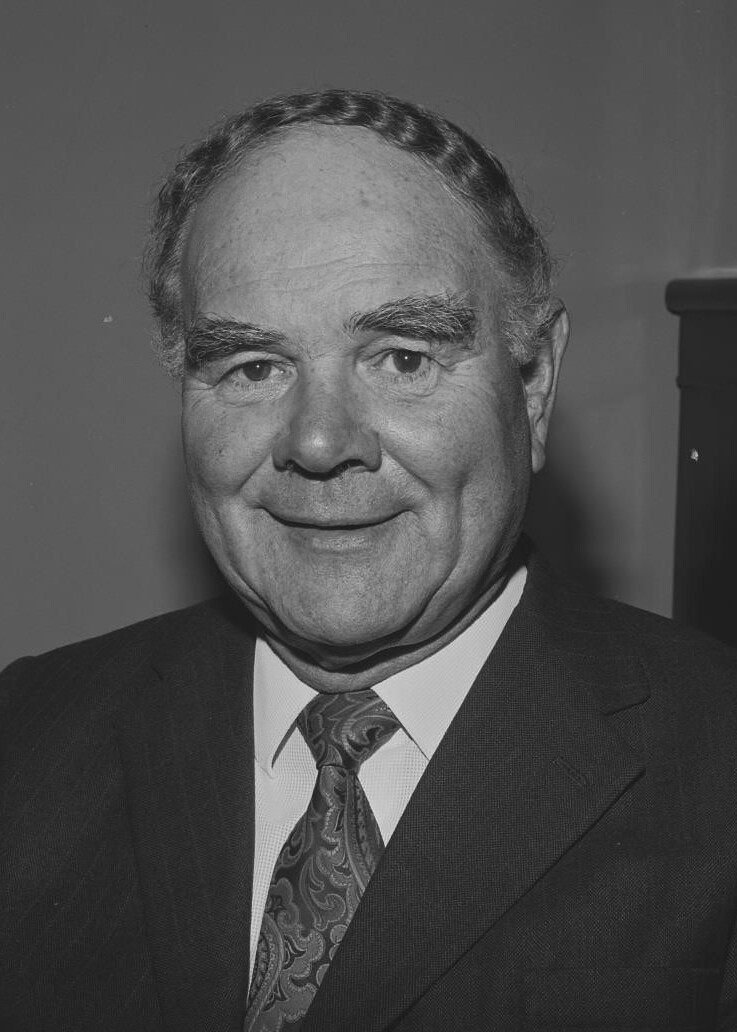
- Reece in 1973

32nd Premier of Tasmania
- In office 26 August 1958 – 26 May 1969
- Deputy: John Dwyer; Roy Fagan
- Preceded by: Robert Cosgrove
- Succeeded by: Angus Bethune
- Constituency: Darwin/Braddon
- In office 3 May 1972 – 31 March 1975
- Deputy: Merv Everett; Bill Neilson
- Preceded by: Angus Bethune
- Succeeded by: Bill Neilson

Personal details
- Born: 6 July 1909 Mathinna, Tasmania, Australia
- Died: 23 October 1999 (aged 90) Hobart, Tasmania
- Party: Labor Party
- Spouse: Alice "Lal" Hanigan

Eric Elliott Reece, AC (6 July 1909 – 23 October 1999) was Premier of Tasmania on two occasions: from 26 August 1958 to 26 May 1969, and from 3 May 1972 to 31 March 1975. His 13 years as premier remains the second longest in Tasmania's history, second to only Robert Cosgrove. Reece was the first Premier of Tasmania to have been born in the 20th century.

== Early life ==
Born in the small Tasmanian town of Mathinna, Reece joined the Australian Workers' Union in 1934, having that year obtained a job at a copper mine after four years' unemployment. From 1935 to 1946 he was in charge of the AWU's West Coast District organisation.

== Politics ==
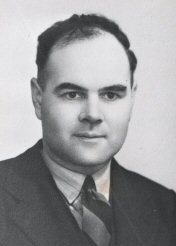
Reece c. 1946

Reece attempted to enter the House of Representatives for the Division of Darwin at the federal elections of 1940 and 1943, but failed both times. In 1943, his successful opponent was Dame Enid Lyons.

On 23 November 1946, Reece was elected to the Tasmanian House of Assembly, representing the state seat of Darwin. He would represent this seat, renamed Braddon in 1955, until his retirement in 1975. Straight away he was appointed to the cabinet led by Sir Robert Cosgrove, and over the next 12 years he held various portfolios, including the Ministry of Mines, the Ministry of Housing, and the Ministry of Lands and Works. These roles he combined with the federal presidency of the Labor Party between 1952 and 1955.

=== Premier of Tasmania ===
Reece became leader of the state Labor Party, and hence Premier, in 1958 after Cosgrove's resignation.

Unexpectedly, Reece lost the premiership in 1969, when the ALP was narrowly defeated by the Liberal Party led by Angus Bethune. This ended 35 years of uninterrupted Labor government in Tasmania. The Liberals had gained a one-seat majority in the House of Assembly by forming a coalition with former Speaker Kevin Lyons, who had founded his own Centre Party. Nevertheless, the period of non-Labor rule ended when Lyons quit the coalition, forcing Bethune back to the polls in 1972. Reece and the Labor Party regained control in a landslide win. This was as much a personal victory as a political one, since Reece himself topped the poll in Braddon with 35.4%, still a record for an individual candidate in that electorate. As of 2016 he remains the last person to make a comeback as Premier of any Australian state after losing the position.

Well known for his staunch support of Tasmania's Hydro Electric Commission and its power development schemes on the Gordon River, Reece acquired as a result the nickname 'Electric Eric'. In 1972, he controversially approved the flooding of Lake Pedder in Tasmania's south west, which proceeded despite a determined protest movement and a blank cheque offer from Prime Minister Gough Whitlam to preserve the Lake Pedder area. Reece refused Whitlam's offer, stating that he would 'not have the Federal Government interfering with the sovereign rights of Tasmania.'

Reece retrospectively commented:

There was a National Park out there, but I can't remember exactly where it was ... at least, it wasn't of substantial significance in the scheme of things. The thing that was significant was that we had to double the output of power in this state in 10 years in order [to] supply the demands of industry and the community. And this was the scheme that looked as though it could do a greater part of [the] job for us.

For a while during the 1970s, Reece combined his duties as Premier with a return to the ALP's federal presidency. On 31 March 1975 he resigned as premier and retired from politics; by this stage, the party had introduced a mandatory retirement age of 65. To this day Reece remains one of the few Australian state politicians who never spent a day on the backbench. He spent his entire 28-plus years in the House of Assembly as minister (1946–1958), premier (1958–1969 and 1972–1975) or opposition leader (1969–1972).

=== Retirement ===
Despite being no longer involved with day-to-day state politics after 1975, Reece continued to make occasional public appearances. The most famous of these was when he took part in the December 1982 rally at Queenstown in support of the Organisation for Tasmanian Development. On this occasion he marched with the incumbent Liberal Premier Robin Gray (a great and self-confessed admirer of his, despite the two men's political differences) in support of the Gordon-below-Franklin dam He died on 23 October 1999 at the age of 90.

Political offices
Preceded by Robert Cosgrove	Premier of Tasmania; 1958–1969	Succeeded by Angus Bethune
Preceded by Angus Bethune	Leader of the Opposition in Tasmania; 1969–1972	Succeeded by Max Bingham
Preceded by Angus Bethune	Premier of Tasmania; 1972–1975	Succeeded by Bill Neilson
