= Results of the 1955 Tasmanian state election =

Tasmanian state election, 19 February 1955 House of Assembly << 1950–1956 >>
Enrolled voters	173,165				
Votes cast	162,637		Turnout	93.92	–0.60
Informal votes	6,158		Informal	3.79	–0.69
Summary of votes by party
Party	Primary votes	%	Swing	Seats	Change
Labor	82,362	52.63	+4.00	15	± 0
Liberal	70,959	45.35	–2.23	15	+ 1
Independent	3,158	2.02	–1.72	0	– 1
Total	156,479			30	

This is a list of House of Assembly results for the 1955 Tasmanian election.

== Results by division ==
=== Bass ===
1955 Tasmanian state election: Bass
Party	Candidate	Votes	%	±%
Quota		4,372		
Labor	Claude Barnard (elected 1)	4,281	14.0	+4.5
Labor	John Madden (elected 2)	3,635	11.9	−1.8
Labor	Reg Turnbull (elected 6)	3,287	10.7	−2.1
Labor	Alexander Atkins	2,699	8.8	+2.7
Labor	Henry McGee	1,626	5.3	+5.3
Labor	Wallace Fraser	836	2.7	+2.7
Liberal	John Steer (elected 3)	3,686	12.0	+0.5
Liberal	Bill Beattie (elected 5)	3,266	10.7	+1.5
Liberal	Fred Marriott (elected 4)	2,949	9.6	+0.4
Liberal	William Fry	2,155	7.0	+7.0
Liberal	James McGowen	1,225	4.0	+1.6
Liberal	Jean Law	793	2.6	+2.6
Independent	Norton Delanty	160	0.5	+0.5
Total formal votes		30,598	95.9	−0.2
Informal votes		1,295	4.1	+0.2
Turnout		31,893	93.9	−1.0
Party total votes
Labor		16,364	53.5	−0.7
Liberal		14,074	46.0	+0.2
Independent	Norton Delanty	160	0.5	+0.5

=== Darwin ===
1955 Tasmanian state election: Darwin
Party	Candidate	Votes	%	±%
Quota		4,412		
Labor	Eric Reece (elected 1)	6,484	21.0	+2.9
Labor	Charley Aylett (elected 3)	3,072	9.9	−3.2
Labor	Carrol Bramich (elected 6)	2,372	7.7	+0.5
Labor	Sydney Ward	1,979	6.4	+6.4
Labor	Raymond Durkin	1,808	5.9	+5.9
Labor	Sydney Richardson	755	2.4	+2.4
Liberal	Jack Breheny (elected 2)	4,024	13.0	+4.2
Liberal	John Fidler (elected 3)	3,467	11.2	+2.0
Liberal	Kevin Lyons (elected 4)	3,237	10.5	+1.5
Liberal	Edward Gaby	1,432	4.6	+4.6
Liberal	Trevor Frampton	1,340	4.3	+4.3
Liberal	Horace Lane	912	3.0	+3.0
Total formal votes		30,882	96.8	+0.6
Informal votes		1,028	3.2	−0.6
Turnout		31,910	93.7	−1.0
Party total votes
Labor		16,470	53.3	+6.5
Liberal		14,412	46.7	−5.7

=== Denison ===
1955 Tasmanian state election: Denison
Party	Candidate	Votes	%	±%
Quota		3,633		
Labor	Robert Cosgrove (elected 2)	6,194	24.4	+1.5
Labor	Alfred White (elected 3)	2,287	9.0	−0.5
Labor	Terence Bower	1,920	7.6	+7.6
Labor	Frank Gaha (elected 6)	1,146	4.5	−4.6
Labor	Ross Maher	858	3.4	+3.4
Labor	William Hannon	509	2.0	+2.0
Liberal	Rex Townley (elected 1)	7,961	31.3	−5.1
Liberal	Bill Hodgman (elected 5)	1,021	4.0	+4.0
Liberal	Harold Solomon	687	2.7	+2.7
Liberal	Thomas Lipscombe	514	2.0	+2.0
Liberal	Horace Strutt (elected 4)	447	1.8	+0.4
Liberal	William Stanton	181	0.7	+0.7
Independent	Bill Wedd	1,699	6.7	−2.1
Total formal votes		25,424	96.2	+2.5
Informal votes		1,008	3.8	−2.5
Turnout		26,432	92.4	−0.9
Party total votes
Labor		12,914	50.8	+4.6
Liberal		10,811	42.5	−1.6
Independent	Bill Wedd	1,699	6.7	−2.1

=== Franklin ===
1955 Tasmanian state election: Franklin
Party	Candidate	Votes	%	±%
Quota		5,289		
Labor	John Dwyer (elected 2)	5,483	14.8	+2.0
Labor	Bill Neilson (elected 3)	4,958	13.4	+1.7
Labor	Charles Hand (elected 4)	3,405	9.2	+1.0
Labor	Brian Crawford	2,137	5.8	+5.8
Labor	Mervyn Jacobson	1,678	4.5	+4.5
Labor	Daniel Malone	830	2.2	+2.2
Liberal	Mabel Miller (elected 1)	5,619	15.2	+15.2
Liberal	Thomas Pearsall (elected 5)	3,648	9.9	+1.6
Liberal	Tim Jackson (elected 6)	3,018	8.2	−4.9
Liberal	Doug Clark	2,049	5.5	+5.5
Liberal	Walter Rayner	1,939	5.2	+5.2
Liberal	Harold Hayes	959	2.6	+2.6
Independent	Leo McPartlan	1,299	3.5	+3.5
Total formal votes		37,022	96.2	+0.4
Informal votes		1,472	3.8	−0.4
Turnout		38,494	94.2	−1.3
Party total votes
Labor		18,491	49.9	+5.4
Liberal		17,232	46.5	−0.3
Independent	Leo McPartlan	1,299	3.5	+3.5

=== Wilmot ===
1955 Tasmanian state election: Wilmot
Party	Candidate	Votes	%	±%
Quota		4,651		
Labor	Roy Fagan (elected 1)	5,983	18.4	−3.1
Labor	Douglas Cashion (elected 2)	4,224	13.0	+3.3
Labor	Reg Fisher	2,722	8.4	+3.0
Labor	Lancelot Spurr (elected 6)	2,652	8.1	+0.7
Labor	William McNeil	1,664	5.1	+5.1
Labor	Walter Haas	878	2.7	+2.7
Liberal	Charles Best (elected 3)	4,037	12.4	+2.5
Liberal	Angus Bethune (elected 4)	2,760	8.5	+1.8
Liberal	Amelia Best (elected 5)	2,727	8.4	+8.4
Liberal	Robert Thompson	1,831	5.6	+5.6
Liberal	Peter Homfray	1,739	5.3	+5.3
Liberal	Maurice Boucher	1,336	4.1	+4.1
Total formal votes		32,553	96.0	+0.3
Informal votes		1,355	4.0	−0.3
Turnout		33,908	95.0	+0.9
Party total votes
Labor		18,123	55.7	+4.5
Liberal		14,430	44.3	−4.5

== See also ==
- 1955 Tasmanian state election
- Members of the Tasmanian House of Assembly, 1955–1956
- Candidates of the 1955 Tasmanian state election
