= Results of the 1969 Tasmanian state election =

Tasmanian state election, 10 May 1969 House of Assembly << 1964–1972 >>
Enrolled voters	210,268				
Votes cast	198,571		Turnout	94.44	–0.99
Informal votes	9,248		Informal	4.66	+0.34
Summary of votes by party
Party	Primary votes	%	Swing	Seats	Change
Labor	90,278	47.68	–3.64	17	– 2
Liberal	67,971	43.98	+5.49	17	+ 1
Centre	8,160	4.31	+4.31	1	+ 1
Democratic Labor	3,258	1.72	–0.07	0	± 0
Independent	4,366	2.31	–0.79	0	± 0
Total	189,323			35	

This is a list of House of Assembly results for the 1969 Tasmanian election.

== Results by division ==
=== Bass ===
1969 Tasmanian state election: Bass
Party	Candidate	Votes	%	±%
Quota		4,581		
Liberal	Bill Beattie (elected 3)	4,361	11.9	+1.0
Liberal	Max Bushby (elected 2)	4,246	11.6	+3.5
Liberal	Timothy Barrenger (elected 5)	3,195	8.7	+8.7
Liberal	James Henty (elected 6)	2,294	6.3	+2.4
Liberal	Henry Bertram	1,256	3.4	+3.4
Liberal	Norman Tilley	804	2.2	+2.2
Liberal	Don Gilmour	763	2.1	+2.1
Labor	Michael Barnard (elected 1)	4,376	11.9	+11.9
Labor	Allan Foster (elected 4)	4,270	11.7	+11.7
Labor	Alexander Atkins (elected 7)	2,041	5.6	−6.1
Labor	Mac Le Fevre	1,538	4.2	−5.8
Labor	Laurence Lovett	1,077	2.9	−0.7
Labor	John Madden	892	2.4	−8.1
Labor	Eric Down	798	2.2	−0.4
Labor	Wallace Fraser	561	1.5	−3.8
Centre	Bruce Kekwick	1,034	2.8	+2.8
Centre	Jeffrey Weston	544	1.5	+1.5
Centre	Edward Smith	56	0.2	+0.2
Independent	Neil Pitt	1,087	3.0	+3.0
Group A	Leslie Arnold	386	1.1	+0.2
Group A	George Brookes	340	0.9	+0.9
Democratic Labor	Peter Ferrall	385	1.1	+1.1
Democratic Labor	Eris Smyth	338	0.9	+0.9
Total formal votes		36,642	95.3	+0.3
Informal votes		1,815	4.7	−0.3
Turnout		38,457	93.6	−1.7
Party total votes
Liberal		16,919	46.2	+5.0
Labor		15,553	42.4	−7.5
Centre		1,634	4.5	+4.5
Independent	Neil Pitt	1,087	3.0	+3.0
Group A		726	2.0	+0.6
Democratic Labor		723	2.0	0.0

=== Braddon ===
1969 Tasmanian state election: Braddon
Party	Candidate	Votes	%	±%
Quota		4,921		
Labor	Eric Reece (elected 1)	13,452	34.2	−0.5
Labor	Lloyd Costello (elected 3)	2,104	5.3	−0.9
Labor	Geoff Chisholm (elected 5)	1,476	3.7	−0.6
Labor	Sydney Ward (elected 4)	1,399	3.6	−1.0
Labor	Joseph Britton	1,386	3.5	+1.6
Labor	Donald Crowe	600	1.5	+1.5
Labor	Jack Crawford	432	1.1	+1.1
Labor	Gordon O'Shannessey	304	0.8	−0.6
Liberal	Wilfred Barker (elected 2)	4,087	10.4	+4.5
Liberal	William Young	2,619	6.7	+0.7
Liberal	Jack Breheny (elected 7)	2,555	6.5	−0.7
Liberal	Alan Moore	1,691	4.3	+4.3
Liberal	John Davis	999	2.5	+2.5
Liberal	Ray Grey	960	2.4	+1.0
Liberal	Bruce Walker	633	1.6	+1.6
Centre	Kevin Lyons (elected 6)	3,546	9.0	+9.0
Centre	Lawrence Ling	252	0.6	+0.6
Centre	Laurie Heathorn	242	0.6	+0.6
Centre	Lloyd Hodgkinson	75	0.2	+0.2
Democratic Labor	John Chapman-Mortimer	443	1.1	+0.8
Democratic Labor	Dudley McNamara	106	0.3	+0.3
Total formal votes		39,361	95.8	−0.8
Informal votes		1,730	4.2	+0.8
Turnout		41,091	94.7	−0.9
Party total votes
Labor		21,153	53.7	−2.9
Liberal		13,544	34.4	+1.5
Centre		4,115	10.5	+10.5
Democratic Labor		549	1.4	−0.9

=== Denison ===
1969 Tasmanian state election: Denison
Party	Candidate	Votes	%	±%
Quota		4,921		
Liberal	Nigel Abbott (elected 1)	5,144	13.1	+6.7
Liberal	Robert Mather (elected 3)	3,084	7.8	+2.6
Liberal	Max Bingham (elected 4)	2,999	7.6	+7.6
Liberal	Ronald Banks	2,182	5.5	+5.5
Liberal	Bob Baker (elected 5)	1,622	4.1	+4.1
Liberal	George Brown	1,524	3.9	+0.9
Liberal	Horace Strutt	1,086	2.8	+1.1
Liberal	John Hand	1,035	2.6	+2.6
Labor	Merv Everett (elected 2)	5,073	12.9	+2.5
Labor	Ken Austin (elected 6)	3,213	8.2	+3.3
Labor	Neil Batt (elected 7)	2,978	7.6	+7.6
Labor	Harry McLoughlin	2,692	6.8	−5.8
Labor	Reginald Richardson	971	2.5	+2.5
Labor	Albert Schluter	889	2.3	+2.3
Labor	Malcolm Hills	739	1.9	+1.9
Labor	Donald Finlay	643	1.6	+1.6
Independent	Bill Wedd	2,395	6.1	+2.7
Democratic Labor	Michael Delaney	685	1.7	+1.7
Democratic Labor	Leslie Foley	160	0.4	+0.4
Centre	Jim Campbell	142	0.4	+0.4
Centre	James Rimmer	106	0.3	+0.3
Total formal votes		39,362	95.0	−0.5
Informal votes		2,055	5.0	+0.5
Turnout		41,417	92.9	−1.1
Party total votes
Liberal		18,676	47.4	+2.5
Labor		17,198	43.7	−0.3
Independent	Bill Wedd	2,395	6.1	+2.7
Democratic Labor		845	2.1	+2.1
Centre		248	0.6	+0.6

=== Franklin ===
1969 Tasmanian state election: Franklin
Party	Candidate	Votes	%	±%
Quota		4,453		
Labor	Eric Barnard (elected 1)	5,309	14.9	−2.4
Labor	Bill Neilson (elected 2)	5,062	14.2	−7.3
Labor	Doug Lowe (elected 4)	2,346	6.6	+6.6
Labor	Terry Martin	1,714	4.8	−3.4
Labor	John Parsons	1,380	3.9	+3.9
Labor	Jack Frost (elected 5)	1,311	3.7	+0.2
Labor	Daniel Doyle	949	2.7	+2.7
Labor	John Dillon	471	1.3	+1.3
Liberal	Doug Clark (elected 3)	4,647	13.0	+7.8
Liberal	Geoff Pearsall (elected 6)	2,673	7.5	−3.4
Liberal	Bill Young	2,429	6.8	−1.1
Liberal	Eric Iles	2,243	6.3	+3.3
Liberal	Stanley Gough (elected 7)	1,926	5.4	+5.4
Liberal	Leslie Thirgood	1,108	3.1	+3.1
Liberal	William Ryan	712	2.0	+2.0
Democratic Labor	Kathleen Delaney	516	1.4	+1.4
Democratic Labor	Denis Sainsbury	172	0.5	+0.5
Centre	Gerald Lyons	470	1.3	+1.3
Centre	James Earnshaw	181	0.5	+0.5
Total formal votes		35,619	95.5	+0.2
Informal votes		1,665	4.5	−0.2
Turnout		37,284	95.8	−0.4
Party total votes
Labor		18,542	52.1	−1.1
Liberal		15,738	44.2	+7.7
Democratic Labor		688	1.9	+1.9
Centre		651	1.8	+1.8

=== Wilmot ===
1969 Tasmanian state election: Wilmot
Party	Candidate	Votes	%	±%
Quota		4,793		
Liberal	Angus Bethune (elected 1)	6,598	17.2	+1.2
Liberal	Bob Ingamells (elected 3)	4,005	10.4	+2.0
Liberal	Bert Bessell (elected 4)	3,599	9.4	+1.6
Liberal	Ian Braid (elected 7)	1,364	3.6	+3.6
Liberal	Michael Ibbott	1,218	3.2	+3.2
Liberal	Kenneth O'Brien	1,112	2.9	−0.2
Liberal	Robert Winspear	488	1.3	+1.3
Labor	Roy Fagan (elected 2)	4,895	12.8	−3.8
Labor	Douglas Cashion (elected 5)	3,450	9.0	−3.3
Labor	William Anderson (elected 6)	3,295	8.6	+0.3
Labor	Thomas McDonald	2,249	5.9	−1.4
Labor	Stephen Byron	1,692	4.4	+4.4
Labor	Don Marriott	1,090	2.8	+2.8
Labor	John MacRostie	583	1.5	+1.5
Labor	Harold Singleton	578	1.5	+1.5
Centre	Allen Brown	1,102	2.9	+2.9
Centre	Geoffrey Dean	248	0.6	+0.6
Centre	Anthony Weston	162	0.4	+0.4
Democratic Labor	Ronald Butterworth	292	0.8	+0.8
Democratic Labor	Darryl Sulzberger	161	0.4	+0.4
Independent	Norman Feil	158	0.4	+0.4
Total formal votes		38,339	95.1	−1.0
Informal votes		1,983	4.9	+1.0
Turnout		40,322	95.4	−0.5
Party total votes
Liberal		18,384	48.0	+10.5
Labor		17,832	46.5	−5.8
Centre		1,512	3.9	+3.9
Democratic Labor		453	1.2	−0.7
Independent	Norman Feil	158	0.4	+0.4

== See also ==
- 1969 Tasmanian state election
- Members of the Tasmanian House of Assembly, 1969–1972
- Candidates of the 1969 Tasmanian state election
