= Results of the 1948 Tasmanian state election =

Tasmanian state election, 21 August 1948 House of Assembly << 1946–1950 >>
Enrolled voters	161,088				
Votes cast	148,588		Turnout	92.24%	+1.17%
Informal votes	5,866		Informal	3.95%	–6.13%
Summary of votes by party
Party	Primary votes	%	Swing	Seats	Change
Labor	70,476	49.38%	–1.59%	15	– 1
Liberal	54,010	37.84%	+3.59%	12	± 0
Ind. Lib.	9,729	6.82%	–1.96%	1	± 0
Independent	8,330	5.84%	–0.17%	2	+ 1
Total	142,722			30	

This is a list of House of Assembly results for the 1948 Tasmanian election.

== Results by division ==
=== Bass ===
1948 Tasmanian state election: Bass
Party	Candidate	Votes	%	±%
Quota		3,819		
Labor	John Madden (elected 1)	4,501	16.8	+1.2
Labor	Reg Turnbull (elected 2)	3,953	14.8	−1.4
Labor	Eric Howroyd (elected 4)	2,286	8.6	−0.1
Labor	Alexander Atkins	1,632	6.1	+0.3
Labor	John Carter	1,625	6.1	+1.3
Labor	Henry Hurst	940	3.5	+3.5
Liberal	Fred Marriott (elected 3)	3,225	12.1	+4.0
Liberal	John Orchard (elected 6)	2,249	8.4	+8.4
Liberal	John Steer	2,083	7.8	+7.8
Liberal	Bill Beattie (elected 5)	2,074	7.8	+0.5
Liberal	Jack Breheny	1,068	4.0	+4.0
Liberal	Allen Hollingsworth	917	3.4	−2.4
Liberal	Stewart Chapple	178	0.7	+0.7
Total formal votes		26,731	96.8	+7.7
Informal votes		888	3.2	−7.7
Turnout		27,619	89.8	−1.1
Party total votes
Labor		14,937	55.9	−2.0
Liberal		11,794	44.1	+12.2

=== Darwin ===
1948 Tasmanian state election: Darwin
Party	Candidate	Votes	%	±%
Quota		4,182		
Labor	Eric Reece (elected 1)	5,255	18.0	+2.9
Labor	Charley Aylett (elected 2)	4,018	13.7	+1.4
Labor	Carrol Bramich (elected 5)	1,784	6.1	+1.9
Labor	Aubrey Bartram	1,488	5.1	+5.1
Labor	Michael Smith	777	2.7	−1.6
Labor	Harold Purton	646	2.2	+2.2
Liberal	Jack Chamberlain (elected 3)	3,684	12.6	−0.2
Liberal	John Fidler (elected 4)	2,350	8.0	−3.0
Liberal	Gerald Acheson	2,044	7.0	+0.9
Liberal	Kevin Lyons (elected 6)	1,567	5.4	+5.4
Liberal	Percy Williams	1,361	4.6	+0.8
Liberal	James Hilder	939	3.2	+3.2
Liberal	Vivian Byard	927	3.2	+3.2
Liberal	Wilfred French	505	1.7	+1.7
Independent	Henry McFie	1,498	5.1	+5.1
Independent	Leslie Margetts	274	0.9	+0.9
Independent	Ellis Batten	155	0.5	+0.5
Total formal votes		29,272	95.5	+3.5
Informal votes		1,382	4.5	−3.5
Turnout		30,654	94.6	+4.5
Party total votes
Labor		13,968	47.7	−1.8
Liberal		13,377	45.7	−2.0
Independent		1,927	6.6	+6.6

=== Denison ===
1948 Tasmanian state election: Denison
Party	Candidate	Votes	%	±%
Quota		3,960		
Labor	Robert Cosgrove (elected 1)	5,642	20.4	+3.6
Labor	Alfred White (elected 3)	3,106	11.2	+3.0
Labor	John Nolan	1,119	4.0	+0.5
Labor	Henry Hope (elected 5)	1,046	3.8	+3.8
Labor	Albert Bowring	518	1.9	+1.9
Labor	Timothy Mahoney	494	1.8	+1.8
Labor	Norman Cooper	419	1.5	+1.5
Liberal	Horace Strutt (elected 6)	1,484	5.4	+1.1
Liberal	Campbell Duncan	1,409	5.1	+5.1
Liberal	John Kennedy	984	3.6	+3.6
Liberal	Wilfred Osborne	552	2.0	+2.0
Liberal	Joyce Heathorn	457	1.6	−1.1
Liberal	Robert Harvey	391	1.4	−0.8
Liberal	Hubert Lewis	309	1.1	+1.1
Liberal	Gerald Lyons	201	0.7	+0.7
Group C	Rex Townley (elected 2)	5,535	20.0	−12.0
Group C	Edgar Lee	228	0.8	+0.8
Group A	Bill Wedd (elected 4)	2,820	10.2	+10.2
Group A	Victor Ratten	484	1.7	+1.7
Group A	Cyril Hosan	61	0.2	+0.2
Independent	Thomas Layton	282	1.0	+1.0
Independent	George Wallis	175	0.6	+0.6
Total formal votes		27,716	95.5	+6.5
Informal votes		1,304	4.5	−6.5
Turnout		29,020	90.1	+0.1
Party total votes
Labor		12,344	44.5	−0.8
Liberal		5,787	20.9	+1.5
Group C		5,763	20.8	−11.2
Group A		3,365	12.1	+12.1
Independent	Thomas Layton	282	1.0	+1.0
Independent	George Wallis	175	0.6	+0.6

=== Franklin ===
1948 Tasmanian state election: Franklin
Party	Candidate	Votes	%	±%
Quota		4,735		
Labor	John Dwyer (elected 1)	5,423	16.4	+8.8
Labor	Bill Neilson (elected 4)	3,471	10.5	+2.6
Labor	Charles Hand (elected 3)	3,249	9.8	+4.4
Labor	Rowland Worsley	1,591	4.8	+4.8
Labor	John Brown	1,443	4.4	+2.6
Labor	Marjorie Somerville	667	2.0	+2.0
Liberal	Reg Wright (elected 2)	5,226	15.8	+1.5
Liberal	Tim Jackson (elected 5)	2,395	7.2	+1.8
Liberal	Archibald Park	1,725	5.2	+1.0
Liberal	Olive Calvert	733	2.2	+2.2
Liberal	Ronald Morrisby	658	2.0	+2.0
Liberal	Artur Griffiths	475	1.4	+1.4
Group Independent	George Gray (elected 6)	2,754	8.3	+1.2
Group Independent	Thomas Pearsall	2,041	6.2	+6.2
Group Independent	Arthur Cross	578	1.7	+1.7
Group Independent	Royce Turnbull	519	1.6	+1.6
Independent	Leonard Martin	124	0.4	+0.4
Independent	Henry Martin	70	0.2	+0.2
Total formal votes		33,142	95.9	+6.4
Informal votes		1,415	4.1	−6.4
Turnout		34,557	93.9	+1.4
Party total votes
Labor		15,844	47.8	−3.7
Liberal		11,212	33.8	−1.4
Group Independent		5,892	17.8	+4.5
Independent	Leonard Martin	124	0.4	+0.4
Independent	Henry Martin	70	0.2	+0.2

=== Wilmot ===
1948 Tasmanian state election: Wilmot
Party	Candidate	Votes	%	±%
Quota		3,695		
Labor	Roy Fagan (elected 2)	5,172	20.0	+8.6
Labor	Lancelot Spurr (elected 6)	2,232	8.6	−2.6
Labor	Peter Pike (elected 5)	2,229	8.6	−1.5
Labor	Charles Burnell	1,882	7.3	+1.5
Labor	Douglas Cashion	1,266	4.9	+0.8
Labor	Henry Gregg	602	2.3	+2.3
Liberal	Neil Campbell (elected 1)	5,748	22.2	+6.8
Liberal	Robert Wordsworth	1,736	6.7	+6.7
Liberal	Robert Robertson (elected 4)	1,343	5.2	−1.7
Liberal	Charles Best	1,252	4.8	+4.8
Liberal	Angus Bethune (elected 3)	1,154	4.5	−0.3
Liberal	Leslie Brown	607	2.3	+2.3
Independent	Thomas Churchward-Kelly	638	2.5	+2.5
Total formal votes		25,861	96.7	+6.8
Informal votes		877	3.3	−6.8
Turnout		26,738	92.5	+0.6
Party total votes
Labor		13,383	51.7	+0.5
Liberal		11,840	45.8	+9.5
Independent	Thomas Churchward-Kelly	638	2.5	+2.5

== See also ==
- 1948 Tasmanian state election
- Members of the Tasmanian House of Assembly, 1948–1950
- Candidates of the 1948 Tasmanian state election
