= Candidates of the 1955 Tasmanian state election =

The 1955 Tasmanian state election was held on 19 February 1955.

== Retiring Members ==
=== Liberal ===
- Neil Campbell MHA (Wilmot)
- Archibald Park MHA (Franklin)

== House of Assembly ==
Sitting members are shown in bold text. Tickets that elected at least one MHA are highlighted in the relevant colour. Successful candidates are indicated by an asterisk (*).

=== Bass ===
Six seats were up for election. The Labor Party was defending three seats. The Liberal Party was defending three seats.

Labor candidates	Liberal candidates	Ungrouped candidates
Alexander Atkins; **Claude Barnard***; Wallace Fraser; Henry McGee; **John Madden***; **Reg Turnbull***	**Bill Beattie***; William Fry; Jean Law; James McGowen; **Fred Marriott***; **John Steer***	Norton Delanty

=== Darwin ===
Six seats were up for election. The Labor Party was defending three seats. The Liberal Party was defending three seats.

Labor candidates	Liberal candidates
**Charley Aylett***; **Carrol Bramich***; Raymond Durkin; **Eric Reece***; Sydney Richardson; Sydney Ward	**Jack Breheny***; **John Fidler***; Trevor Frampton; Edward Gaby; Horace Lane; **Kevin Lyons***

=== Denison ===
Six seats were up for election. The Labor Party was defending three seats. The Liberal Party was defending two seats. One seat had been won at the previous election by independent candidate Bill Wedd; he had resigned in 1953 to run for the Legislative Council and was replaced by fellow independent Leo McPartlan, who at this election ran for Franklin.

Labor candidates	Liberal candidates	Ungrouped candidates
Terence Bower; **Robert Cosgrove***; **Frank Gaha***; William Hannon; Ross Maher; **Alfred White***	Bill Hodgman*; Thomas Lipscombe; Harold Solomon; William Stanton; **Horace Strutt***; **Rex Townley***	Bill Wedd

=== Franklin ===
Six seats were up for election. The Labor Party was defending three seats. The Liberal Party was defending three seats.

Labor candidates	Liberal candidates	Ungrouped candidates
Brian Crawford; **John Dwyer***; **Charles Hand***; Mervyn Jacobson; Daniel Malone; **Bill Neilson***	Doug Clark; Harold Hayes; **Tim Jackson***; Mabel Miller*; **Thomas Pearsall***; Walter Rayner	**Leo McPartlan**

=== Wilmot ===
Six seats were up for election. The Labor Party was defending three seats. The Liberal Party was defending three seats.

Labor candidates	Liberal candidates
**Douglas Cashion***; **Roy Fagan***; Reg Fisher; Walter Haas; William McNeil; **Lancelot Spurr***	Amelia Best*; **Charles Best***; **Angus Bethune***; Maurice Boucher; Peter Homfray; Robert Thompson

== See also ==
- Members of the Tasmanian House of Assembly, 1950–1955
- Members of the Tasmanian House of Assembly, 1955–1956
