= Members of the Tasmanian House of Assembly, 1950–1955 =

This is a list of members of the Tasmanian House of Assembly between the 6 May 1950 election and the 19 February 1955 election.

Name	Party	Division	Years in office
Charley Aylett	Labor	Darwin	1946–1964
Claude Barnard	Labor	Bass	1950–1957
Bill Beattie^{[3]}	Liberal	Bass	1946–1950; 1954–1979
Charles Best	Liberal	Wilmot	1950–1958
Angus Bethune	Liberal	Wilmot	1946–1975
Carrol Bramich	Labor	Darwin	1946–1964
Jack Breheny^{[1]}	Liberal	Darwin	1951–1972
Neil Campbell	Liberal	Wilmot	1922–1955
Douglas Cashion	Labor	Wilmot	1949–1972
Jack Chamberlain^{[1]}	Liberal	Darwin	1934–1951
Hon Robert Cosgrove	Labor	Denison	1919–1922; 1925–1931; 1934–1958
Hon John Dwyer	Labor	Franklin	1931–1962
Hon Roy Fagan	Labor	Wilmot	1946–1974
John Fidler	Liberal	Darwin	1946–1956
Dr John Gaha	Labor	Denison	1950–1964
Hon Charles Hand	Labor	Franklin	1948–1956
Tim Jackson	Liberal	Franklin	1946–1964
Kevin Lyons	Liberal	Darwin	1948–1972
Leo McPartlan^{[2]}	Independent	Denison	1953–1955
Hon John Madden	Labor	Bass	1936–1956; 1957–1969
Fred Marriott	Liberal	Bass	1946–1961
Bill Neilson	Labor	Franklin	1946–1977
John Orchard^{[3]}	Liberal	Bass	1948–1954
Archibald Park	Liberal	Franklin	1949–1955; 1959
Thomas Pearsall	Liberal	Franklin	1950–1966
Hon Eric Reece	Labor	Darwin	1946–1975
Lancelot Spurr	Labor	Wilmot	1941–1956
John Steer	Liberal	Bass	1950–1961; 1964–1968
Horace Strutt	Liberal	Denison	1946–1959; 1959–1969
Rex Townley	Liberal	Denison	1946–1965
Hon Dr Reg Turnbull	Labor	Bass	1946–1961
Bill Wedd^{[2]}	Independent	Denison	1948–1953; 1959–1964
Hon Alfred White	Labor	Franklin	1941–1959

== Notes ==
^{1} Liberal MHA for Darwin, Jack Chamberlain, resigned on 22 March 1951 to contest an Australian Senate seat. A recount on 2 April 1951 resulted in the election of Liberal candidate Jack Breheny.
^{2} Independent MHA for Denison, Bill Wedd, resigned in September 1953. A recount on 24 October 1953 resulted in the election of Independent candidate Leo McPartlan.
^{3} Liberal MHA for Bass, John Orchard, resigned on 25 March 1954 to contest the Council seat of Cornwall. A recount on 5 April 1954 resulted in the election of Liberal candidate Bill Beattie.

== Sources ==
- Hughes, Colin A.; Graham, B. D. (1976). Voting for the South Australian, Western Australian and Tasmanian Lower Houses, 1890-1964. Canberra: Australian National University. ISBN 0-7081-1334-6.
- Parliament of Tasmania (2006). The Parliament of Tasmania from 1856
