= Members of the Tasmanian House of Assembly, 1964–1969 =

This is a list of members of the Tasmanian House of Assembly between the 2 May 1964 election and the 10 May 1969 election.

Name	Party	Division	Years in office
Dr Nigel Abbott	Liberal	Denison	1964–1972
William Anderson	Labor	Wilmot	1964–1972
Hon Alexander Atkins	Labor	Bass	1946–1948; 1956–1972
Ken Austin	Labor	Denison	1964–1976
Wilfred Barker	Liberal	Braddon	1964–1976
Eric Barnard	Labor	Franklin	1959–1979
Bill Beattie	Liberal	Bass	1946–1950; 1954–1979
Bert Bessell	Liberal	Wilmot	1956–1976
Angus Bethune	Liberal	Wilmot	1946–1975
Jack Breheny	Liberal	Braddon	1951–1972
George Deas Brown^{[1]}	Liberal	Denison	1965–1969
Max Bushby	Liberal	Bass	1961–1986
Hon Douglas Cashion	Labor	Wilmot	1949–1972
Geoff Chisholm	Labor	Braddon	1964–1979
Doug Clark	Liberal	Franklin	1964–1976
Lloyd Costello	Labor	Braddon	1959–1975
Hon Merv Everett	Labor	Denison	1964–1974
Hon Roy Fagan	Labor	Wilmot	1946–1974
Wallace Fraser	Labor	Bass	1961–1969
Jack Frost	Labor	Franklin	1964–1976
James Henty^{[3]}	Liberal	Bass	1968–1972
Eric Iles^{[2]}	Liberal	Franklin	1966–1969
Bob Ingamells	Liberal	Wilmot	1959–1976
Mac Le Fevre	Labor	Bass	1959–1969; 1972–1976
Kevin Lyons	Liberal/Independent/Centre Party	Braddon	1948–1972
Thomas McDonald	Labor	Wilmot	1959–1969
Hon Harry McLoughlin	Labor	Denison	1959–1969
Hon John Madden	Labor	Bass	1936–1956; 1957–1969
Terry Martin	Labor	Franklin	1964–1969
Robert Mather	Liberal	Denison	1964–1982
Hon Bill Neilson	Labor	Franklin	1946–1977
Thomas Pearsall^{[2]}	Liberal	Franklin	1950–1966
Hon Eric Reece	Labor	Braddon	1946–1975
John Steer^{[3]}	Liberal	Bass	1950–1961; 1964–1968
Horace Strutt	Liberal	Denison	1946–1959; 1959–1969
Rex Townley^{[1]}	Liberal	Denison	1946–1965
Hon Sydney Ward	Labor	Braddon	1956–1976
Bill Young	Liberal	Franklin	1959–1969

== Notes ==
^{1} Liberal MHA for Denison, Rex Townley, resigned on 30 June 1965. A recount on 10 July 1965 resulted in the election of Liberal candidate George Deas Brown.
^{2} Liberal MHA for Franklin, Thomas Pearsall, resigned to contest the Franklin federal seat at the 1966 election. A recount on 27 November 1966 resulted in the election of Liberal candidate Eric Iles.
^{3} Liberal MHA for Bass, John Steer, died on 10 October 1968. A recount on 25 October 1968 resulted in the election of Liberal candidate James Henty.

== Sources ==
- Hughes, Colin A.; Graham, B. D. (1976). Voting for the South Australian, Western Australian and Tasmanian Lower Houses, 1890-1964. Canberra: Australian National University. ISBN 0-7081-1334-6.
- Parliament of Tasmania (2006). The Parliament of Tasmania from 1856
