= Members of the Tasmanian House of Assembly, 1969–1972 =

This is a list of members of the Tasmanian House of Assembly between the 10 May 1969 election and the 22 April 1972 election.

Name	Party	Division	Years in office
Hon Dr Nigel Abbott	Liberal/Independent	Denison	1964–1972
William Anderson	Labor	Wilmot	1964–1972
Hon Alexander Atkins	Labor	Bass	1946–1948; 1956–1972
Ken Austin	Labor	Denison	1964–1976
Bob Baker	Liberal	Denison	1969–1980
Hon Wilfred Barker	Liberal	Braddon	1964–1976
Eric Barnard	Labor	Franklin	1959–1979
Michael Barnard	Labor	Bass	1969–1986
Timothy Barrenger	Liberal	Bass	1969–1972
Neil Batt	Labor	Denison	1969–1980; 1986–1989
Hon Bill Beattie	Liberal	Bass	1946–1950; 1954–1979
Hon Bert Bessell	Liberal	Wilmot	1956–1976
Hon Angus Bethune	Liberal	Wilmot	1946–1975
Hon Max Bingham	Liberal	Denison	1969–1984
Ian Braid	Liberal	Wilmot	1969–1972; 1976–1995
Jack Breheny	Liberal	Braddon	1951–1972
Max Bushby	Liberal	Bass	1961–1986
Hon Douglas Cashion	Labor	Wilmot	1949–1972
Geoff Chisholm	Labor	Braddon	1964–1979
Hon Doug Clark	Liberal	Franklin	1964–1976
Lloyd Costello	Labor	Braddon	1959–1975
Merv Everett	Labor	Denison	1964–1974
Hon Roy Fagan	Labor	Wilmot	1946–1974
Dr Allan Foster	Labor	Bass	1969–1976
Jack Frost	Labor	Franklin	1964–1976
Stanley Gough	Liberal	Franklin	1969–1972
James Henty	Liberal	Bass	1968–1972
Bob Ingamells	Liberal	Wilmot	1959–1976
Doug Lowe	Labor	Franklin	1969–1986
Hon Kevin Lyons	Centre Party	Braddon	1948–1972
Hon Robert Mather	Liberal	Denison	1964–1982
Hon Bill Neilson	Labor	Franklin	1946–1977
Geoff Pearsall	Liberal	Franklin	1969–1988
Hon Eric Reece	Labor	Braddon	1946–1975
Hon Sydney Ward	Labor	Braddon	1956–1976

== Sources ==
- Parliament of Tasmania (2006). The Parliament of Tasmania from 1856
