= Candidates of the 1948 Tasmanian state election =

The 1948 Tasmanian state election was held on 21 August 1948.

== Retiring Members ==
=== Labor ===
- Charles Culley MHA (Denison)

=== Liberal ===
- Charles Atkins MHA (Denison)

== House of Assembly ==
Sitting members are shown in bold text. Tickets that elected at least one MHA are highlighted in the relevant colour. Successful candidates are indicated by an asterisk (*).

=== Bass ===
Six seats were up for election. The Labor Party was defending four seats. The Liberal Party was defending two seats.

Labor candidates	Liberal candidates
**Alexander Atkins**; John Carter; **Eric Howroyd***; Henry Hurst; **John Madden***; **Reg Turnbull***	**Bill Beattie***; Jack Breheny; Stewart Chapple; Allen Hollingsworth; **Fred Marriott***; John Orchard*; John Steer

=== Darwin ===
Six seats were up for election. The Labor Party was defending three seats. The Liberal Party was defending three seats, although Liberal MHA Henry McFie was running as an independent.

Labor candidates	Liberal candidates	Independent candidates
**Charley Aylett***; Aubrey Bartram; **Carrol Bramich***; Harold Purton; **Eric Reece***; Michael Smith	Gerald Acheson; Vivian Byard; **Jack Chamberlain***; **John Fidler***; Wilfred French; James Hilder; Kevin Lyons*; Percy Williams	Ellis Batten; **Henry McFie**; Leslie Margetts

=== Denison ===
Six seats were up for election. The Labor Party was defending three seats. The Liberal Party was defending two seats. One seat was being defended by independent MHA Rex Townley.

Labor candidates	Liberal candidates	Group A candidates	Group C candidates	Ungrouped candidates
Albert Bowring; Norman Cooper; **Robert Cosgrove***; Henry Hope*; Timothy Mahoney; John Nolan; **Alfred White***	Campbell Duncan; Robert Harvey; Joyce Heathorn; John Kennedy; Hubert Lewis; Gerald Lyons; Wilfred Osborne; **Horace Strutt***	Cyril Hosan; Victor Ratten; Bill Wedd*	Edgar Lee; **Rex Townley***	Thomas Layton; George Wallis

=== Franklin ===
Six seats were up for election. The Labor Party was defending three seats. The Liberal Party was defending two seats. Independent MHA George Gray was defending one seat.

Labor candidates	Liberal candidates	Independent candidates	Ungrouped candidates
**John Brown**; **John Dwyer***; Charles Hand*; **Bill Neilson***; Marjorie Somerville; Rowland Worsley	Olive Calvert; Artur Griffiths; **Tim Jackson***; Ronald Morrisby; Archibald Park; **Reg Wright***	Arthur Cross; **George Gray***; Thomas Pearsall; Royce Turnbull	Henry Martin; Leonard Martin

=== Wilmot ===
Six seats were up for election. The Labor Party was defending three seats. The Liberal Party was defending three seats.

Labor candidates	Liberal candidates	Ungrouped candidates
Charles Burnell; Douglas Cashion; **Roy Fagan***; Henry Gregg; **Peter Pike***; **Lancelot Spurr***	Charles Best; **Angus Bethune***; Leslie Brown; **Neil Campbell***; **Robert Robertson***; Robert Wordsworth	Thomas Churchward-Kelly

== See also ==
- Members of the Tasmanian House of Assembly, 1946–1948
- Members of the Tasmanian House of Assembly, 1948–1950
