= Members of the Tasmanian House of Assembly, 1955–1956 =

This is a list of members of the Tasmanian House of Assembly between the 19 February 1955 election and the 13 October 1956 election.

Name	Party	Division	Years in office
Charley Aylett	Labor	Darwin	1946–1964
Claude Barnard	Labor	Bass	1950–1957
Bill Beattie	Liberal	Bass	1946–1950; 1954–1979
Amelia Best	Liberal	Wilmot	1955–1956; 1958–1959
Charles Best	Liberal	Wilmot	1950–1958
Angus Bethune	Liberal	Wilmot	1946–1975
Carrol Bramich	Labor/Liberal	Darwin	1946–1964
Jack Breheny	Liberal	Darwin	1951–1972
Douglas Cashion	Labor	Wilmot	1949–1972
Hon Robert Cosgrove	Labor	Denison	1919–1922; 1925–1931; 1934–1958
Hon John Dwyer	Labor	Franklin	1931–1962
Hon Roy Fagan	Labor	Wilmot	1946–1974
John Fidler	Liberal	Darwin	1946–1956
Dr John Gaha	Labor	Denison	1950–1964
Hon Charles Hand	Labor	Franklin	1948–1956
Bill Hodgman	Liberal	Denison	1955–1964
Tim Jackson	Liberal	Franklin	1946–1964
Kevin Lyons	Liberal	Darwin	1948–1972
Hon John Madden	Labor	Bass	1936–1956; 1957–1969
Fred Marriott	Liberal	Bass	1946–1961
Mabel Miller	Liberal	Franklin	1955–1964
Bill Neilson	Labor	Franklin	1946–1977
Thomas Pearsall	Liberal	Franklin	1950–1966
Hon Eric Reece	Labor	Darwin	1946–1975
Lancelot Spurr	Labor	Wilmot	1941–1956
John Steer	Liberal	Bass	1950–1961; 1964–1968
Horace Strutt	Liberal	Denison	1946–1959; 1959–1969
Rex Townley	Liberal	Denison	1946–1965
Hon Dr Reg Turnbull	Labor	Bass	1946–1961
Hon Alfred White	Labor	Franklin	1941–1959

== Sources ==
- Hughes, Colin A.; Graham, B. D. (1976). Voting for the South Australian, Western Australian and Tasmanian Lower Houses, 1890-1964. Canberra: Australian National University. ISBN 0-7081-1334-6.
- Parliament of Tasmania (2006). The Parliament of Tasmania from 1856
