= Members of the Tasmanian House of Assembly, 1948–1950 =

This is a list of members of the Tasmanian House of Assembly between the 21 August 1948 election and the 6 May 1950 election.

Name	Party	Division	Years in office
Charley Aylett	Labor	Darwin	1946–1964
Bill Beattie	Liberal	Bass	1946–1950; 1954–1979
Angus Bethune	Liberal	Wilmot	1946–1975
Carrol Bramich	Labor	Darwin	1946–1964
Neil Campbell	Liberal	Wilmot	1922–1955
Douglas Cashion^{[1]}	Labor	Wilmot	1949–1972
Jack Chamberlain	Liberal	Darwin	1934–1951
Hon Robert Cosgrove	Labor	Denison	1919–1922; 1925–1931; 1934–1958
Hon John Dwyer	Labor	Franklin	1931–1962
Hon Roy Fagan	Labor	Wilmot	1946–1974
John Fidler	Liberal	Darwin	1946–1956
George Gray	Independent	Franklin	1946–1950
Charles Hand	Labor	Franklin	1948–1956
Henry Hope	Labor	Denison	1941–1946; 1948–1950
Hon Eric Howroyd	Labor	Bass	1937–1950; 1958–1959
Tim Jackson	Liberal	Franklin	1946–1964
Kevin Lyons	Liberal	Darwin	1948–1972
Hon John Madden	Labor	Bass	1936–1956; 1957–1969
Fred Marriott	Liberal	Bass	1946–1961
Bill Neilson	Labor	Franklin	1946–1977
John Orchard	Liberal	Bass	1948–1954
Archibald Park^{[2]}	Liberal	Franklin	1949–1955; 1959
Peter Pike^{[1]}	Labor	Wilmot	1943–1949
Hon Eric Reece	Labor	Darwin	1946–1975
Robert Robertson	Liberal	Wilmot	1946–1950
Lancelot Spurr	Labor	Wilmot	1941–1956
Horace Strutt	Liberal	Denison	1946–1959; 1959–1969
Rex Townley	Independent/Liberal	Denison	1946–1965
Hon Dr Reg Turnbull	Labor	Bass	1946–1961
Bill Wedd	Independent	Denison	1948–1953; 1959–1964
Hon Alfred White	Labor	Franklin	1941–1959
Reg Wright^{[2]}	Liberal	Franklin	1946–1949

== Notes ==
^{1} Labor MHA for Wilmot and Speaker of the House, Peter Pike, died on 3 September 1949. A recount on 19 September 1949 resulted in the election of Labor candidate Douglas Cashion.
^{2} Liberal MHA for Franklin, Reg Wright, resigned to contest a seat in the Australian Senate at the 1949 election. A recount on 8 November 1949 resulted in the election of Liberal candidate Archibald Park.

== Sources ==
- Hughes, Colin A.; Graham, B. D. (1976). Voting for the South Australian, Western Australian and Tasmanian Lower Houses, 1890-1964. Canberra: Australian National University. ISBN 0-7081-1334-6.
- Parliament of Tasmania (2006). The Parliament of Tasmania from 1856
