= Results of the 2022 Australian federal election in Tasmania =

Federal election results in Tasmania, Australia

2022 Australian federal election (Tasmania)
← 2019	21 May 2022	2025 →

All 5 Tasmanian seats in the Australian House of Representatives and 6 seats in the Australian Senate
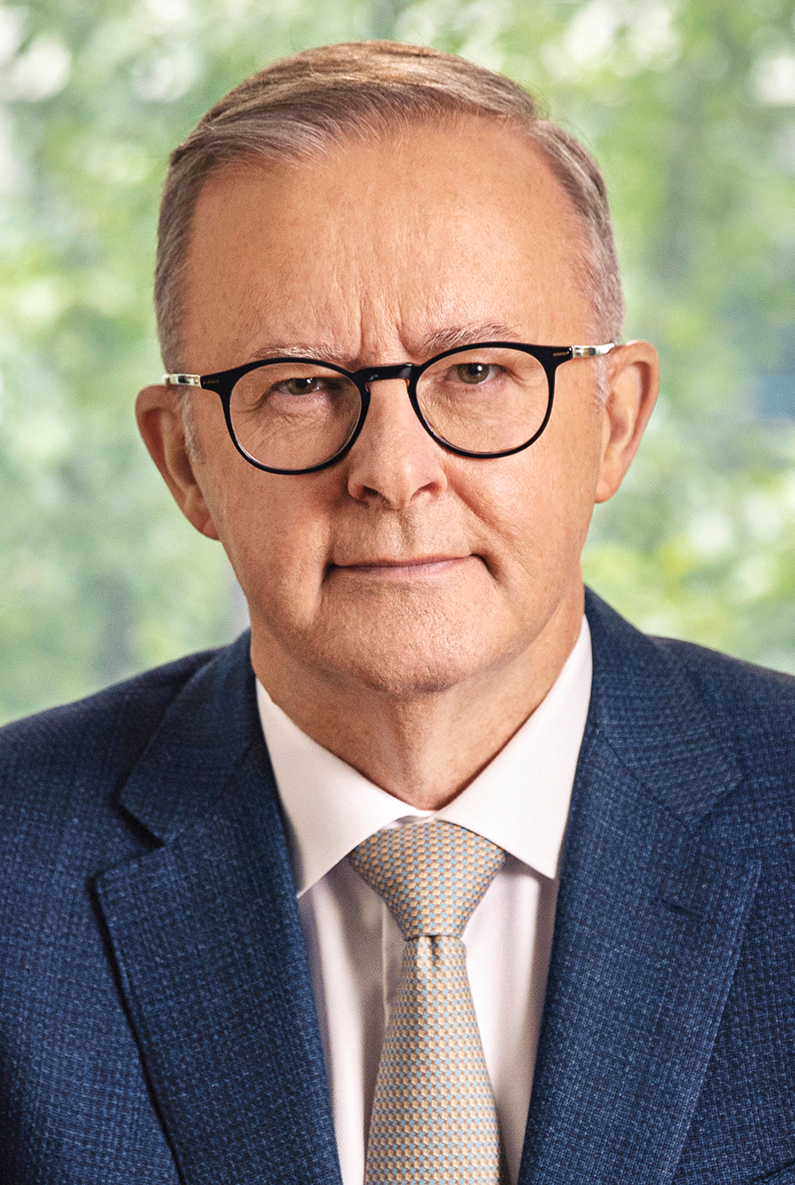

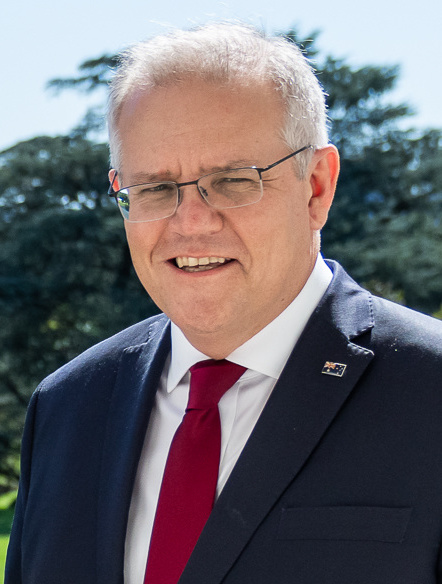
	First party	Second party
Leader	Anthony Albanese	Scott Morrison
Party	Labor	Liberal
Last election	2 seats	2 seats
Seats won	2	2
Seat change	Steady	Steady
Popular vote	95,322	115,184
Percentage	27.26%	32.94%
Swing	▼6.35	▲2.31
TPP	54.33%	45.67%
TPP swing	▼1.63	▲1.63
- Results by division for the House of Representatives, shaded by winning party's margin of victory.

This is a list of electoral division results for the 2022 Australian federal election in the state of Tasmania.

This election was held using instant-runoff voting. In Tasmania in this election, there was one "turn-over". In Lyons, a Labor candidate who did not lead in the first count took the seat in the end, albeit very marginally. The Liberal candidate finished first before the distribution of preferences.

Tasmania was unique at this election in that the Liberal Party, led by previous Prime Minister Scott Morrison, had an increased vote share, while the Labor Party, led by subsequent Prime Minister Anthony Albanese, had a decreased vote share.

== Overall results ==
House of Representatives (IRV) – Turnout 92.43% (CV)
Party	Votes	%	Swing (pp)	Seats	Change (seats)
Liberal Party of Australia	115,184	32.94	+2.31	2	Steady
Australian Labor Party	95,322	27.26	−6.35	2	Steady
Australian Greens	41,972	12.00	+1.88	0	Steady
Jacqui Lambie Network	23,730	6.79	+6.79	0	Steady
Pauline Hanson's One Nation	13,970	3.99	+1.20	0	Steady
United Australia Party	6,437	1.84	−3.01	0	Steady
Liberal Democratic Party	5,064	1.45	+1.45	0	Steady
Animal Justice Party	4,772	1.36	+0.88	0	Steady
Local Party	4,254	1.22	+1.22	0	Steady
Independent	38,993	11.50	−1.84	1	Steady
Total	349,698			5	Steady
Invalid/blank votes	21,734	5.85	+1.46	–	–
Turnout	371,432	92.43	–1.91	–	–
Registered voters	401,852	–	–	–	–
Two-party-preferred vote
Labor	189,993	54.33	−1.63	–	–
Liberal	159,705	45.67	+1.63	–	–
Source: AEC for both votes and seats

== Results by division ==
=== Bass ===
2022 Australian federal election: Bass
Party	Candidate	Votes	%	±%
Liberal	Bridget Archer	27,257	39.73	−2.60
Labor	Ross Hart	19,630	28.61	−6.13
Greens	Cecily Rosol	7,614	11.10	+0.62
Lambie	Bob Salt	4,587	6.69	+6.69
Independent	George Razay	3,450	5.03	+5.03
One Nation	Melanie Davy	3,230	4.71	+4.71
United Australia	Kyle Squibb	1,140	1.66	−3.20
Animal Justice	Alison Baker	969	1.41	−1.02
Liberal Democrats	Stephen Humble	732	1.07	+1.07
Total formal votes		68,609	94.07	−1.43
Informal votes		4,324	5.93	+1.43
Turnout		72,933	91.95	−2.09
Two-party-preferred result
Liberal	Bridget Archer	35,288	51.43	+1.02
Labor	Ross Hart	33,321	48.57	−1.02
Liberal hold		Swing	+1.02	

Alluvial diagram for preference flows in the seat of Bass in the 2022 federal election. indicates at what stage the winning candidate had over 50% of the votes and was declared the winner.

=== Braddon ===
2022 Australian federal election: Braddon
Party	Candidate	Votes	%	±%
Liberal	Gavin Pearce	31,142	44.11	+6.22
Labor	Chris Lynch	15,886	22.50	−9.56
Lambie	Sophie Lehmann	6,966	9.87	+9.87
Independent	Craig Garland	5,538	7.84	+7.84
Greens	Darren Briggs	4,745	6.72	+1.88
One Nation	Ludo Mineur	3,065	4.34	−1.20
United Australia	Darren Bobbermien	1,000	1.42	−2.26
Liberal Democrats	Duncan White	971	1.38	+1.38
Local	Scott Rankin	719	1.02	+1.02
Animal Justice	Keone Martin	566	0.80	+0.80
Total formal votes		70,598	92.76	−2.33
Informal votes		5,858	7.66	+0.58
Turnout		76,456	92.64	−2.45
Two-party-preferred result
Liberal	Gavin Pearce	40,968	58.03	+4.94
Labor	Chris Lynch	29,630	41.97	−4.94
Liberal hold		Swing	+4.94	

Alluvial diagram for preference flows in the seat of Braddon in the 2022 federal election. indicates at what stage the winning candidate had over 50% of the votes and was declared the winner.

=== Clark ===
2022 Australian federal election: Clark
Party	Candidate	Votes	%	±%
Independent	Andrew Wilkie	30,005	45.54	−4.51
Labor	Simon Davis	12,364	18.76	−1.46
Liberal	Will Coats	10,441	15.85	−1.52
Greens	Janet Shelley	8,861	13.45	+3.88
One Nation	Michelle Cameron	1,715	2.60	+2.60
United Australia	Sandra Galloway	941	1.43	−1.36
Animal Justice	Casey Davies	828	1.26	+1.26
Liberal Democrats	Ian Ramsden	739	1.12	+1.12
Total formal votes		65,894	95.75	−1.81
Informal votes		2,924	4.25	+1.81
Turnout		68,818	92.13	−1.51
Notional two-party-preferred count
Labor	Simon Davis	44,309	67.24	+1.07
Liberal	Will Coats	21,585	32.76	−1.07
Two-candidate-preferred result
Independent	Andrew Wilkie	46,668	70.82	−1.30
Labor	Simon Davis	19,226	29.18	+1.30
Independent hold		Swing	−1.30	

Alluvial diagram for preference flows in the seat of Clark in the 2022 federal election. indicates at what stage the winning candidate had over 50% of the votes and was declared the winner.

=== Franklin ===
2022 Australian federal election: Franklin
Party	Candidate	Votes	%	±%
Labor	Julie Collins	26,147	36.69	−7.30
Liberal	Kristy Johnson	19,048	26.73	−4.54
Greens	Jade Darko	12,370	17.36	+1.11
Lambie	Chris Hannan	4,215	5.92	+5.92
Local	Anna Bateman	3,535	4.96	+4.96
One Nation	Steve Hindley	2,033	2.85	+2.85
Liberal Democrats	Duane Pitt	1,434	2.01	+2.01
United Australia	Lisa Matthews	1,380	1.94	−4.76
Animal Justice	Katrina Love	1,097	1.54	+1.54
Total formal votes		71,259	95.07	−1.78
Informal votes		3,696	4.93	+1.78
Turnout		74,955	93.41	−1.27
Two-party-preferred result
Labor	Julie Collins	45,392	63.70	+1.49
Liberal	Kristy Johnson	25,867	36.30	−1.49
Labor hold		Swing	+1.49	

Alluvial diagram for preference flows in the seat of Franklin in the 2022 federal election. indicates at what stage the winning candidate had over 50% of the votes and was declared the winner.

=== Lyons ===
2022 Australian federal election: Lyons
Party	Candidate	Votes	%	±%
Liberal	Susie Bower	27,296	37.22	+13.04
Labor	Brian Mitchell	21,295	29.04	−7.42
Greens	Liz Johnstone	8,382	11.43	+1.98
Lambie	Troy Pfitzner	7,962	10.86	+10.86
One Nation	Emma Goyne	3,927	5.35	−2.78
United Australia	Jason Evans	1,976	2.69	−3.41
Animal Justice	Anna Gralton	1,312	1.79	+1.79
Liberal Democrats	Rhys Griffiths	1,188	1.62	+1.62
Total formal votes		73,338	93.70	−1.73
Informal votes		4,932	6.30	+1.73
Turnout		78,270	91.90	−2.28
Two-party-preferred result
Labor	Brian Mitchell	37,341	50.92	−4.26
Liberal	Susie Bower	35,997	49.08	+4.26
Labor hold		Swing	−4.26	

Alluvial diagram for preference flows in the seat of Lyons in the 2022 federal election. indicates at what stage the winning candidate had over 50% of the votes and was declared the winner.

== Analysis ==
Unlike mainland Australia, Tasmania saw the Liberal Party perform better than they did at the last election (where they gained two seats from Labor).

Some have suggested that the Coalition's performance in Tasmania improved due to the state's own Liberal government, which has been in power since 2014 under Will Hodgman, Peter Gutwein and Jeremy Rockliff, with the latter being the incumbent. At the time of the election, there were only two states with Liberal or Coalition governments: New South Wales and Tasmania. Following the defeat of New South Wales' three-term-incumbent Coalition government in 2023 under Dominic Perrottet (which saw Labor returning to power in a minority government for the first time in 12 years), Tasmania is currently the only state or territory in Australia to have a Liberal government.

In the primary vote, Labor had a swing against them of 6.35%, receiving less than 100,000 first preference votes. This was also the biggest swing to or against a major party in any state or territory except Western Australia. The Coalition technically had a swing against them of 1.66% given the fact that both the Liberals and the Nationals fielded candidates in Tasmania at the last election, but the Liberal Party saw a swing to them of 2.31% due to the absence of the Nationals. Labor had swings against them in the primary vote in every Tasmanian seat. While the Liberals did have relatively small swings against them in the primary vote in the seats of Bass, Clark and Franklin, they had a swing of over 8% to them in Braddon and a swing of over 12% to them in Lyons.

The Liberal Party won the seats of Bass and Braddon with increased majorities. In the highly marginal seat of Bass, Liberal MP Bridget Archer broke its trend of flipping at each election and won a second term. Braddon, which was traditionally a marginal seat, returned incumbent MP Gavin Pearce with a greatly increased majority. Labor retained the seat of Franklin with an increased majority, but almost lost Lyons, where the Liberal Party had a higher first-preference vote than Labor. Independent Andrew Wilkie, who was first elected to Clark in 2010, retained the seat with an increased majority.

Tasmania was the only state where the Coalition had a swing to them in the two-party-preferred vote, while Labor had a swing against them.
