= 1948 Tasmanian state election =

State election in Australia

- 21 August 1948

All 30 seats to the House of Assembly
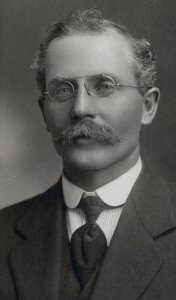

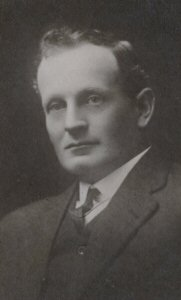
	First party	Second party
Leader	Robert Cosgrove	Neil Campbell
Party	Labor	Liberal
Leader since	25 February 1948	February 1945
Leader's seat	Denison	Wilmot
Last election	16 seats	12 seats
Seats won	15 seats	12 seats
Seat change	▼1	0
Percentage	49.38%	37.84%
Swing	▼1.59	▲3.59
- Results of the election
Premier before election
Robert Cosgrove
Labor
Elected Premier
Robert Cosgrove
Labor

The 1948 Tasmanian state election was held on 21 August 1948 in the Australian state of Tasmania to elect 30 members of the Tasmanian House of Assembly. The election used the Hare-Clark proportional representation system — six members were elected from each of five electorates.

In December 1947, Labor leader Robert Cosgrove had stood down as Premier while he faced charges of bribery, corruption and conspiracy. Cosgrove was acquitted of all charges on 22 February 1948, and was re-elected as Premier by the caucus, taking over from Edward Brooker who had filled in for him for three months. Brooker died on 18 June, four months after handing the premiership back to Cosgrove, and two months prior to the 1948 election.

On 8 July, the Legislative Council voted to grant the House of Assembly two months supply provided an election was called after that time. The election was fought mainly on constitutional issues.

Labor lost its slender one seat majority, winning 15 seats out of 30, although they regained government and Cosgrove remained as Premier after receiving the support of one of the Independent members, Bill Wedd.

== Results ==
Party	Votes	%	+/–	Seats	+/–
Labor	70,476	49.44	-1.59	15	▼1
Liberal	54,010	37.89	+3.59	12	Steady
Ind. Lib.	9,729	6.83	-1.96	1	Steady
Independents	8,330	5.84	-0.17	2	▲1
Total	142,545	100.00	–	30	–
Valid votes	142,545	96.05			
Invalid/blank votes	5,866	3.95	-6.13		
Total votes	148,411	100.00	–		
Registered voters/turnout	161,088	92.13	+1.17		

== Distribution of votes ==
=== Primary vote by division ===
	Bass	Darwin	Denison	Franklin	Wilmot
Labor Party	55.9%	47.7%	44.5%	47.8%	51.7%
Liberal Party	44.1%	45.7%	20.9%	33.8%	45.8%
Other	–	6.6%	34.6%	18.4%	2.5%

=== Distribution of seats ===
Electorate	Seats won
Bass	
Darwin	
Denison	
Franklin	
Wilmot	

Labor
Liberal
Ind. Lib.
Independent

== See also ==
- Members of the Tasmanian House of Assembly, 1948–1950
- Candidates of the 1948 Tasmanian state election
