= 1956 Tasmanian state election =

State election in Australia

- 13 October 1956

All 30 seats to the House of Assembly
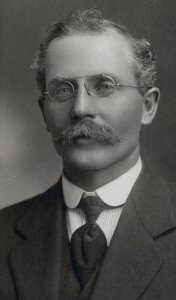

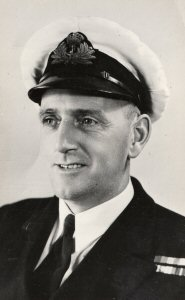
| | First party | Second party |
|---|---|---|
| Leader | Robert Cosgrove | Tim Jackson |
| Party | Labor | Liberal |
| Leader since | 25 February 1948 | 26 June 1956 |
| Leader's seat | Denison | Franklin |
| Last election | 15 seats | 15 seats |
| Seats won | 15 seats | 15 seats |
| Seat change | 0 | 0 |
| Percentage | 50.27% | 43.61% |
| Swing | ▼2.36 | ▼1.74 |
- Results of the election
Premier before election
Robert Cosgrove
Labor
Resulting Premier
Robert Cosgrove
Labor

The 1956 Tasmanian state election was held on 13 October 1956 in the Australian state of Tasmania to elect 30 members of the Tasmanian House of Assembly. The election used the Hare-Clark proportional representation system — six members were elected from each of five electorates.

== Background ==
The 1955 election had resulted in a parliamentary deadlock between the Labor and Liberal parties, with each holding 15 seats in the House of Assembly. Under the terms of a constitutional amendment introduced in 1954, the ALP had been declared the "majority party" as the winner of the most primary votes, with the Liberal Party entitled to appoint the speaker of the House of Assembly and thereby give the ALP a working majority of one seat.

On 11 September 1956, Cosgrove's minister for housing, Carrol Bramich, resigned from the ALP following an internal row, party switching and giving the Liberal opposition a 16–14 majority in the House of Assembly. Cosgrove obtained a dissolution of parliament from the Governor of Tasmania, and an election was called for 13 October.

The electorate of Darwin had been renamed in 1955 to Braddon, after former Premier Sir Edward Braddon.

== Results ==
Following the 1956 election, the ALP and Liberals remained in a 15-seat deadlock. Despite Bramich's defection to the Liberals, Labor picked up a seat in Bramich's electorate of Braddon, maintaining the status quo with Cosgrove and the ALP still in power.

| Party | Votes | % | +/– | Seats | +/– |
|---|---|---|---|---|---|
| Labor | 80,096 | 50.27 | -2.36 | 15 | Steady |
| Liberal | 69,477 | 43.61 | -1.74 | 15 | Steady |
| Australian Labor Party (Anti-Communist) | 5,522 | 3.47 | New | 0 | New |
| Independents | 4,139 | 2.60 | +0.58 | 0 | Steady |
| Communist | 91 | 0.06 | +0.06 | 0 | Steady |
| Total | 159,325 | 100.00 | – | 30 | – |
| Valid votes | 159,325 | 95.81 | | | |
| Invalid/blank votes | 6,968 | 4.19 | +0.40 | | |
| Total votes | 166,293 | 100.00 | – | | |
| Registered voters/turnout | 174,632 | 95.22 | +1.30 | | |

Popular vote
| Labor | 50.27% |
| Liberal | 43.61% |
| Labor (Anti-Communist) | 3.47% |
| Communist | 0.06% |
| Independents | 2.60% |

Seats
| Labor | 50.00% |
| Liberal | 50.00% |

== Distribution of votes ==
=== Primary vote by division ===
| | Bass | Braddon | Denison | Franklin | Wilmot |
|---|---|---|---|---|---|
| Labor Party | 51.5% | 48.5% | 48.7% | 49.0% | 53.7% |
| Liberal Party | 44.5% | 46.9% | 41.4% | 42.9% | 42.5% |
| Other | 4.0% | 4.6% | 9.9% | 8.1% | 3.8% |

=== Distribution of seats ===
| Electorate | Seats won |
|---|---|
| Bass | |
| Braddon | |
| Denison | |
| Franklin | |
| Wilmot | |

| Labor |
| Liberal |

== Government formation and aftermath ==
As both major parties finished with 15 seats, the deadlock provisions of the constitution were again invoked and the ALP was deemed to be the "majority party", having recorded the most popular votes. Cosgrove continued as premier with Liberal MP Kevin Lyons elected as speaker, giving the ALP a working majority.

The subsequent election in 1959 saw the number of seats in the Tasmanian House of Assembly increased to 35, which would prevent the kind of deadlock which resulted from having an even number of seats in the house.

== See also ==
- Members of the Tasmanian House of Assembly, 1956–1959
- Candidates of the 1956 Tasmanian state election
