= James Wilson Henty =

Australian politician

James Wilson Henty (17 July 1909 – 26 January 1995) was an Australian politician.

He was born in Launceston. In 1968 he was elected to the Tasmanian House of Assembly as a Liberal member for Bass in a recount following the death of John Steer. Re-elected at the 1969 election, he was defeated in 1972.

It is unclear whether or not he was descended from the pioneering Henty family.
