= 1972 Tasmanian state election =

State election in Australia

- 22 April 1972

All 35 seats to the House of Assembly
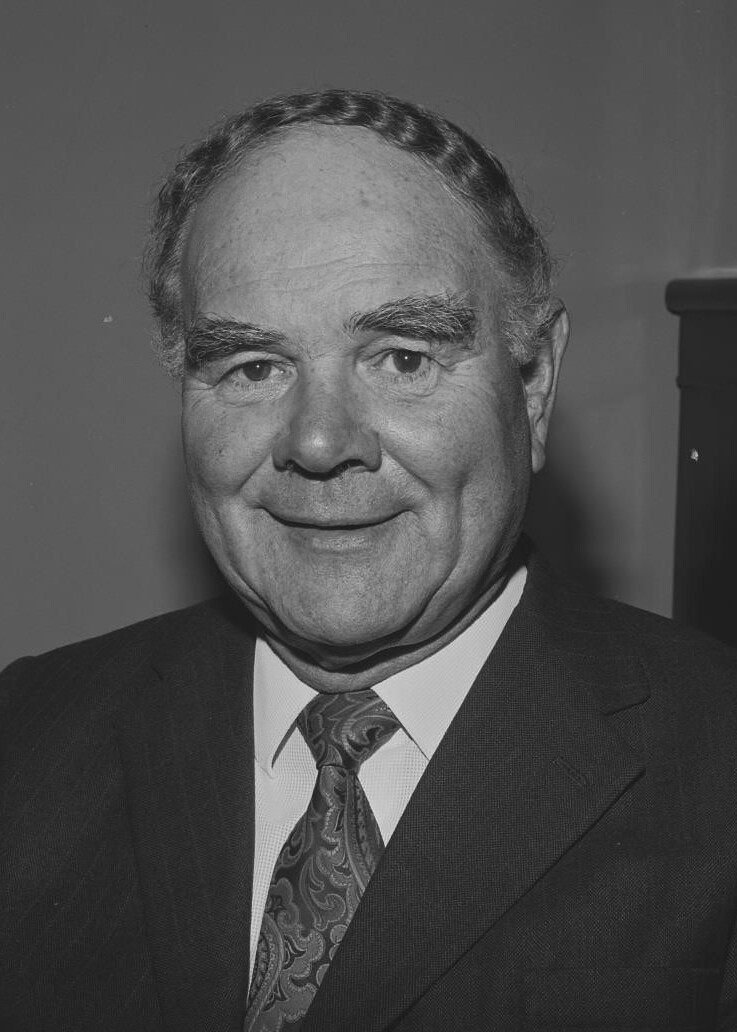

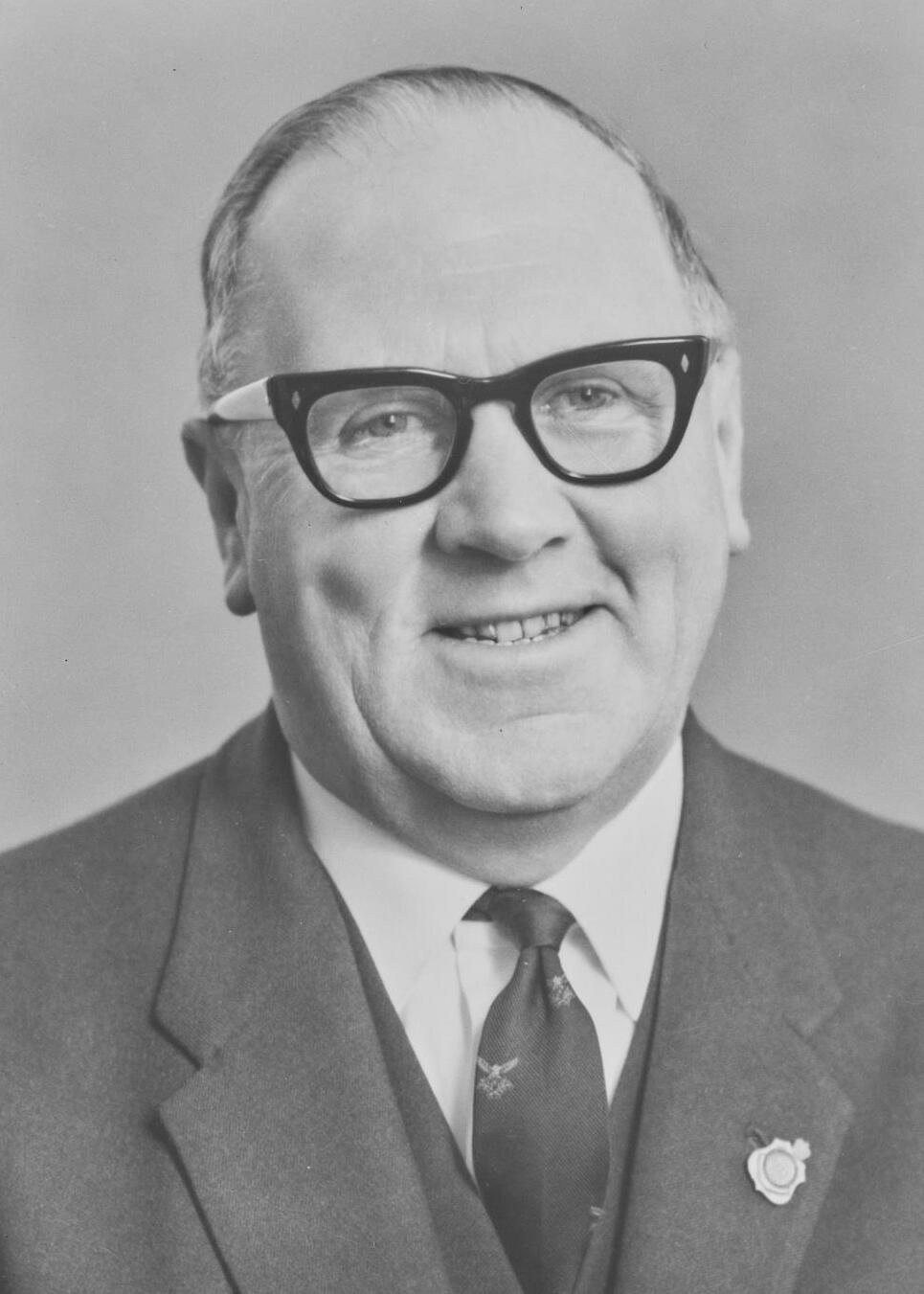
| | First party | Second party |
|---|---|---|
| Leader | Eric Reece | Angus Bethune |
| Party | Labor | Liberal |
| Leader since | 26 August 1958 | 19 March 1960 |
| Leader's seat | Braddon | Wilmot |
| Last election | 17 seats | 17 seats |
| Seats won | 21 seats | 14 seats |
| Seat change | ▲4 | ▼3 |
| Percentage | 54.93% | 38.37% |
| Swing | ▲7.25 | ▼5.61 |
- Results of the election
Premier before election
Angus Bethune
Liberal
Elected Premier
Eric Reece
Labor

The 1972 Tasmanian state election was held on 22 April 1972 in the Australian state of Tasmania to elect 35 members of the Tasmanian House of Assembly. The election used the Hare-Clark proportional representation system — seven members were elected from each of five electorates.

The one-term Liberal government of Premier Angus Bethune had collapsed following the withdrawal of support by Kevin Lyons. The opposition Labor Party, led by Eric Reece, gained a clear majority and won the election.

== Background ==
The 1969 election had resulted in a hung parliament, with the deadlock broken when Kevin Lyons of the Centre Party formed a coalition government with Angus Bethune's Liberal Party. On 15 March 1972, Lyons resigned as Deputy Premier and effectively dissolved the Liberal-Centre coalition. The resulting instability triggered an election.

The 1972 election was also notable due to the emergence and candidacy of the United Tasmania Group, the world's first Green party, formed to campaign against the proposed damming of Lake Pedder.

== Results ==
The Liberals lost three seats, giving Labor a clear majority. Eric Reece was sworn in as Premier of Tasmania for a second time on 3 May 1972. Eric Reece also received the highest personal vote ever in Braddon, gaining 14,790 votes, or 35.4% of the vote.

The United Tasmania Group gained a respectable 3.9% of the vote, failing to gain a seat in the parliament and to stop the damming of Lake Pedder, but their efforts paved the way for the Tasmanian Greens to become a significant force in Tasmanian politics.

| Party | Votes | % | +/– | Seats | +/– |
|---|---|---|---|---|---|
| Labor | 108,910 | 54.93 | +7.25 | 21 | ▲4 |
| Liberal | 76,073 | 38.37 | +7.25 | 14 | ▼3 |
| United Tasmania Group | 7,741 | 3.90 | New | 0 | New |
| Independents | 5,546 | 2.80 | +0.49 | 0 | Steady |
| Other | | | | – | ▼1 |
| Total | 198,270 | 100.00 | – | 35 | – |
| Valid votes | 198,270 | 96.34 | | | |
| Invalid/blank votes | 7,533 | 3.66 | -1.00 | | |
| Total votes | 205,803 | 100.00 | – | | |
| Registered voters/turnout | 216,846 | 94.91 | +0.47 | | |

Popular vote
| Labor | 54.93% |
| Liberal | 38.37% |
| United Tasmania Group | 3.90% |
| Independents | 2.80% |

Seats
| Labor | 60.00% |
| Liberal | 40.00% |

== Distribution of votes ==
=== Primary vote by division ===
| | Bass | Braddon | Denison | Franklin | Wilmot |
|---|---|---|---|---|---|
| Labor Party | 49.3% | 62.9% | 46.3% | 58.7% | 57.0% |
| Liberal Party | 42.9% | 33.8% | 40.0% | 33.3% | 42.1% |
| Other | 7.8% | 3.2% | 13.8% | 8.0% | 1.0% |

=== Distribution of seats ===
| Electorate | Seats won |
|---|---|
| Bass | |
| Braddon | |
| Denison | |
| Franklin | |
| Wilmot | |

| Labor |
| Liberal |

== See also ==
- Members of the Tasmanian House of Assembly, 1972–1976
- Candidates of the 1972 Tasmanian state election
