= Results of the 2019 Australian federal election in Tasmania =

2019 Australian federal election (Tasmania)
← 2016	18 May 2019	2022 →

All 5 Tasmanian seats in the Australian House of Representatives and 6 seats in the Australian Senate
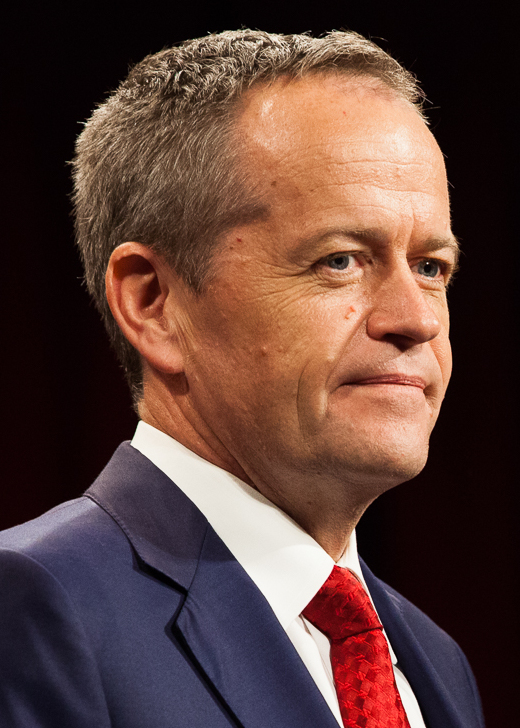

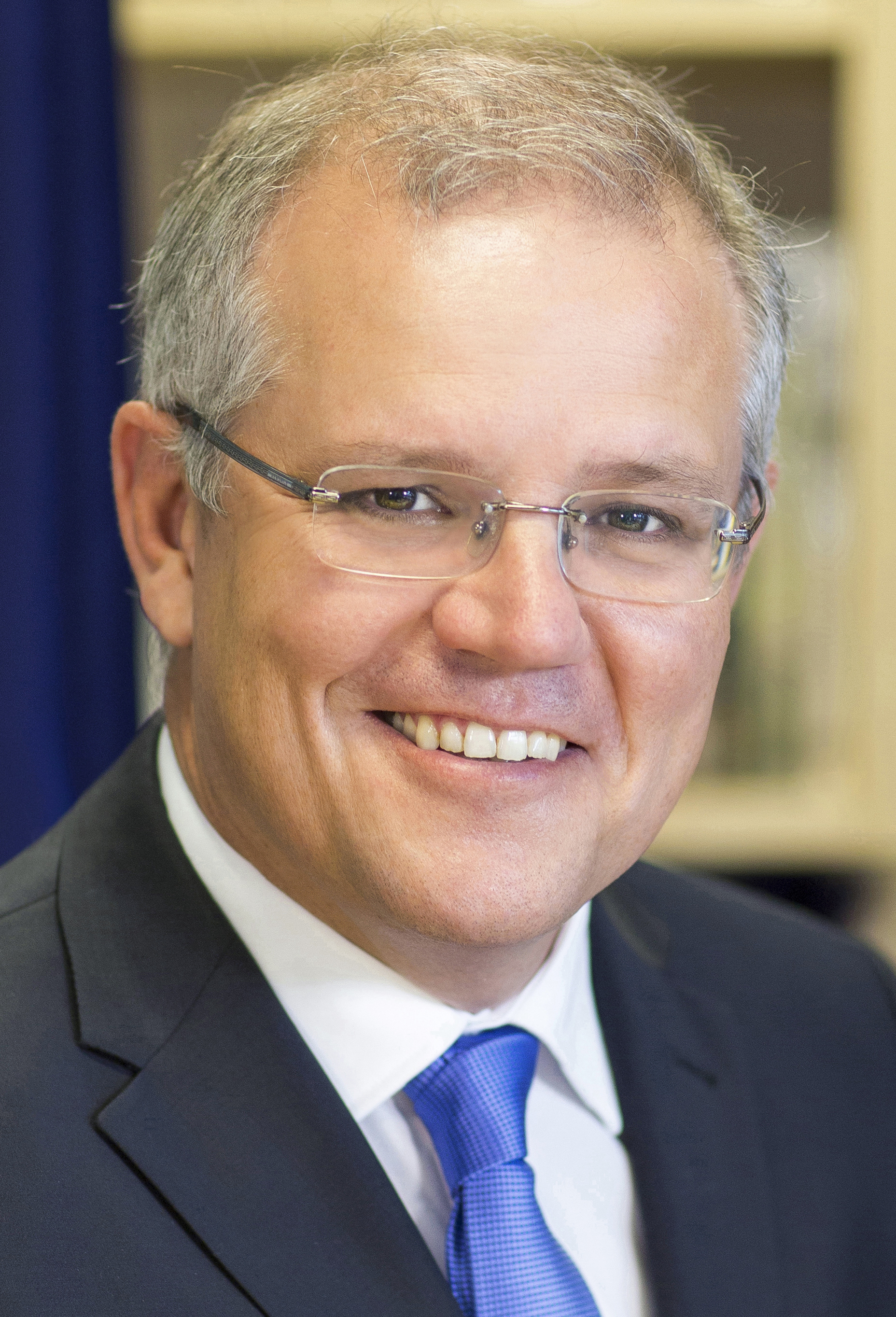
	First party	Second party
Leader	Bill Shorten	Scott Morrison
Party	Labor	Liberal/National coalition
Last election	4 seats	0 seats
Seats won	2 seats	2 seats
Seat change	▼2	▲2
Popular vote	116,955	120,415
Percentage	33.61%	34.60%
Swing	▼4.29	▼0.84
TPP	55.96%	44.04%
TPP swing	▼1.40	▲1.40
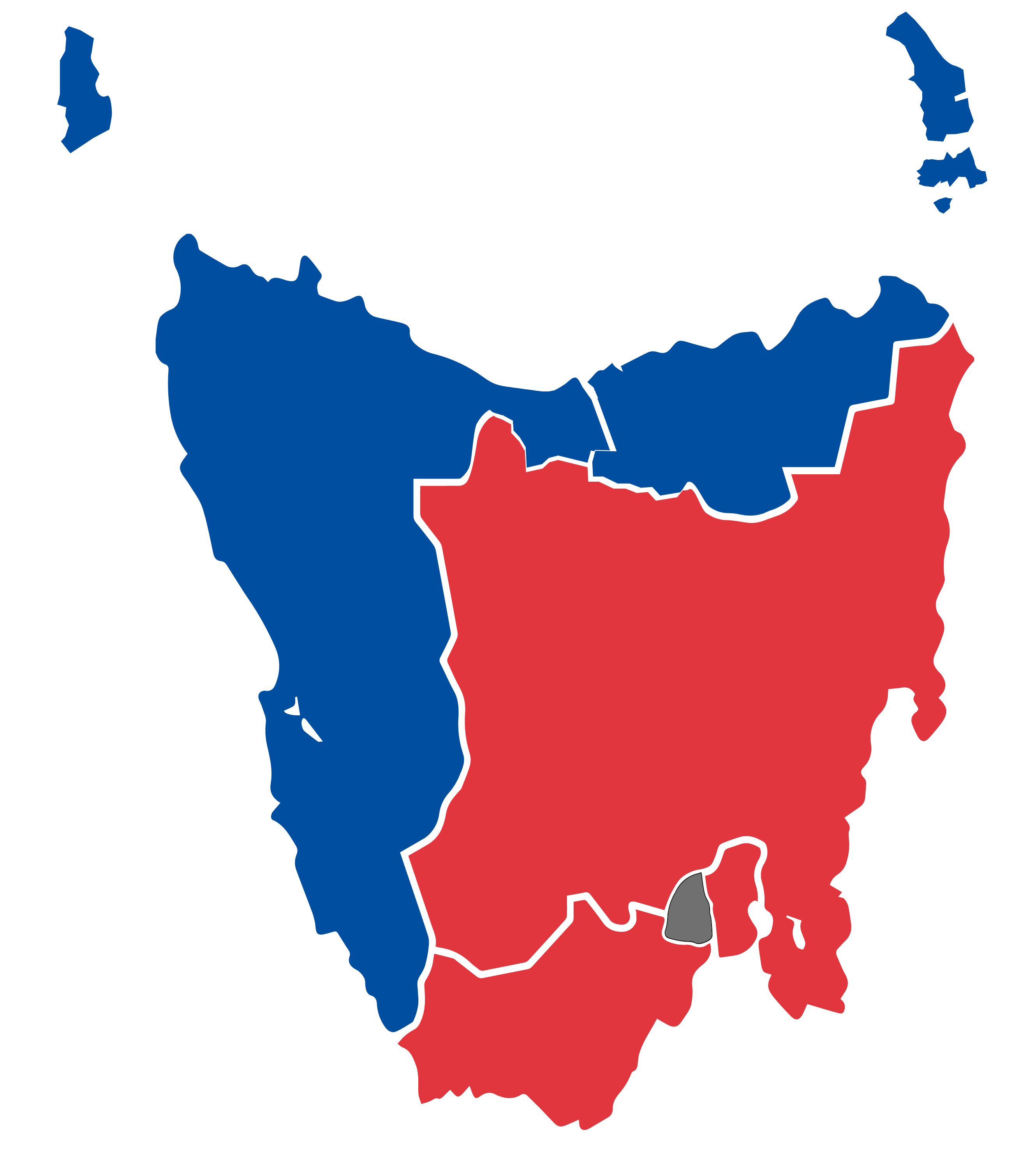
- Results by electorate

This is a list of electoral division results for the 2019 Australian federal election in the state of Tasmania.

== Overall results ==
Party	Votes	%	Swing	Seats	Change
Liberal/National Coalition
Liberal Party of Australia	106,596	30.63	−4.81	2	▲2
National Party of Australia	13,819	3.97	+3.97	0	Steady
Coalition total	120,415	34.60	-0.84	2	▲2
Australian Labor Party	116,955	33.61	−4.29	2	▼2
Australian Greens	35,229	10.12	−0.10		
United Australia Party	16,868	4.85	+4.85		
Pauline Hanson's One Nation	9,699	2.79	+2.79		
Fraser Anning's Conservative National Party	1,969	0.57	+0.57		
Animal Justice Party	1,667	0.48	+0.48		
Independent	45,190	12.99	+4.24	1	Steady
Total	347,992			5	
Two-party-preferred vote
Labor	194,746	55.96	−1.40		
Liberal/National Coalition	153,246	44.04	+1.40		
Invalid/blank votes	15,970	4.39	+0.41	–	–
Registered voters/turnout	385,816	94.34	+0.75	–	–
Source: AEC Tally Room

== Results by division ==
=== Bass ===
2019 Australian federal election: Bass
Party	Candidate	Votes	%	±%
Liberal	Bridget Archer	29,094	42.33	+3.14
Labor	Ross Hart	23,878	34.74	−4.91
Greens	Tom Hall	7,202	10.48	−0.57
United Australia	Allan Roark	3,342	4.86	+4.86
Independent	Todd Lambert	2,607	3.79	+3.79
Animal Justice	Susan Woodbury	1,667	2.43	+2.43
National	Carl Cooper	943	1.37	+1.37
Total formal votes		68,733	95.50	−0.53
Informal votes		3,240	4.50	+0.53
Turnout		71,973	94.04	+0.19
Two-party-preferred result
Liberal	Bridget Archer	34,648	50.41	+5.83
Labor	Ross Hart	34,085	49.59	−5.83
Liberal gain from Labor		Swing	+5.83	

=== Braddon ===
2019 Australian federal election: Braddon
Party	Candidate	Votes	%	±%
Liberal	Gavin Pearce	26,513	37.89	−4.14
Labor	Justine Keay	22,434	32.06	−7.51
Independent	Craig Brakey	7,619	10.89	+10.89
One Nation	Graham Gallaher	3,879	5.54	+5.54
Greens	Phill Parsons	3,384	4.84	−1.99
United Australia	Karen Spaulding	2,575	3.68	+3.68
National	Sally Milbourne	1,654	2.36	+2.36
Independent	Brett Smith	1,203	1.72	+1.72
Conservative National	Shane Allan	712	1.02	+1.02
Total formal votes		69,973	92.92	−1.96
Informal votes		5,330	7.08	+1.96
Turnout		75,303	95.09	+1.44
Two-party-preferred result
Liberal	Gavin Pearce	37,151	53.09	+4.82
Labor	Justine Keay	32,822	46.91	−4.82
Liberal gain from Labor		Swing	+4.82	

=== Clark ===
2019 Australian federal election: Clark
Party	Candidate	Votes	%	±%
Independent	Andrew Wilkie	33,761	50.05	+6.02
Labor	Ben McGregor	13,641	20.22	−2.80
Liberal	Amanda-Sue Markham	11,719	17.37	−2.55
Greens	Juniper Shaw	6,458	9.57	−1.04
United Australia	Jim Starkey	1,882	2.79	+2.79
Total formal votes		67,461	97.56	+0.48
Informal votes		1,689	2.44	−0.48
Turnout		69,150	93.64	+0.45
Notional two-party-preferred count
Labor	Ben McGregor	44,642	66.17	+0.84
Liberal	Amanda-Sue Markham	22,819	33.83	−0.84
Two-candidate-preferred result
Independent	Andrew Wilkie	48,653	72.12	+4.35
Labor	Ben McGregor	18,808	27.88	−4.35
Independent hold		Swing	+4.35	

=== Franklin ===
2019 Australian federal election: Franklin
Party	Candidate	Votes	%	±%
Labor	Julie Collins	30,911	43.99	−2.86
Liberal	Dean Young	21,969	31.27	−3.95
Greens	Kit Darko	11,420	16.25	+2.72
United Australia	Darren Winter	4,704	6.70	+6.70
Conservative National	Darren Hawes	1,257	1.79	+1.79
Total formal votes		70,261	96.85	+0.26
Informal votes		2,284	3.15	−0.26
Turnout		72,545	94.68	+0.80
Two-party-preferred result
Labor	Julie Collins	43,706	62.21	+1.48
Liberal	Dean Young	26,555	37.79	−1.48
Labor hold		Swing	+1.48	

=== Lyons ===
2019 Australian federal election: Lyons
Party	Candidate	Votes	%	±%
Labor	Brian Mitchell	26,091	36.46	−3.93
Liberal	Jessica Whelan	17,301	24.18	−16.44
National	Deanna Hutchinson	11,222	15.68	+15.68
Greens	Gary Whisson	6,765	9.45	+0.26
One Nation	Tennille Murtagh	5,820	8.13	+8.13
United Australia	Michael Warne	4,365	6.10	+6.10
Total formal votes		71,564	95.43	−0.14
Informal votes		3,427	4.57	+0.14
Turnout		74,991	94.18	+0.76
Two-party-preferred result
Labor	Brian Mitchell	39,491	55.18	+1.35
Liberal	Jessica Whelan	32,073	44.82	−1.35
Labor hold		Swing	+1.35	
