= Timothy Barrenger =

Australian politician (born 1940)

Timothy Alan Barrenger (born 15 October 1940) is an Australian former politician. Born in Launceston, he was a Liberal member for Bass in the Tasmanian House of Assembly from 1969 until his retirement in 1972.
