= Centre Party (Tasmania) =

Former Tasmanian political party

The Centre Party, previously the Country Party, was a minor Australian political party in the state of Tasmania. Initially formed in 1962 as a new Tasmanian branch of the Country Party of Australia after decades of inactivity in the state, it at first enjoyed no electoral success. In the run up to the 1969 election the party was joined by Kevin Lyons, a former Liberal turned independent member of the Assembly for Braddon, who renamed it the Centre Party and retained his seat at the election, securing the balance of power and serving as Deputy Premier in a coalition government until 1972. Upon the coalition's collapse the Centre Party faded away before being dissolved in 1975.

The party first contested the 1964 state election, winning 9,280 votes (5.26%) but no seats. Kevin Lyons, the son of the late Prime Minister Joseph Lyons, was originally a member of the Liberal Party. In 1966, a dispute arose over preselection and Lyons resigned from the Liberals on 7 September. Lyons remained in the House of Assembly as an independent, until the 1969 election when he joined the party and renamed it as the Centre Party. Although the party's vote slipped to 8,160 (4.31%), Lyons was re-elected to the House of Assembly as the party's only MHA, after substantial numbers of preferences were transferred to him from Liberal voters in the electorate of Braddon. Labor and the Liberals both won 17 seats in the House, resulting in a hung parliament, with the Centre Party's one seat giving Lyons the balance of power. In negotiations with Liberal leader Angus Bethune, Lyons agreed to form a coalition with the Liberals, and became Bethune's Deputy Premier. The Liberal-Centre coalition lasted until 1972, with Lyons resigning as Deputy Premier after a dispute with Bethune, effectively dissolving the party and the coalition. The resulting instability triggered the 1972 election, which the Centre Party did not contest.

The party's last contests came in the federal elections of 1974 and 1975 (by now as the National Country Party) but had no success. The party disappeared that year.
