= 1964 Tasmanian state election =

State election in Australia

- 2 May 1964

All 35 seats to the House of Assembly
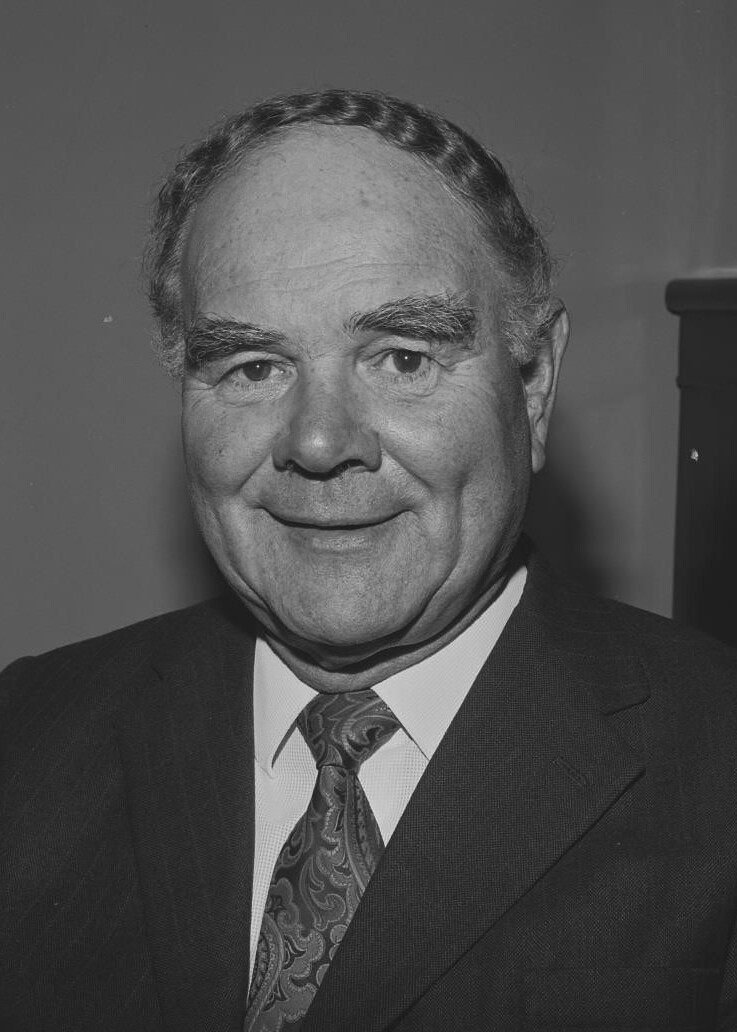

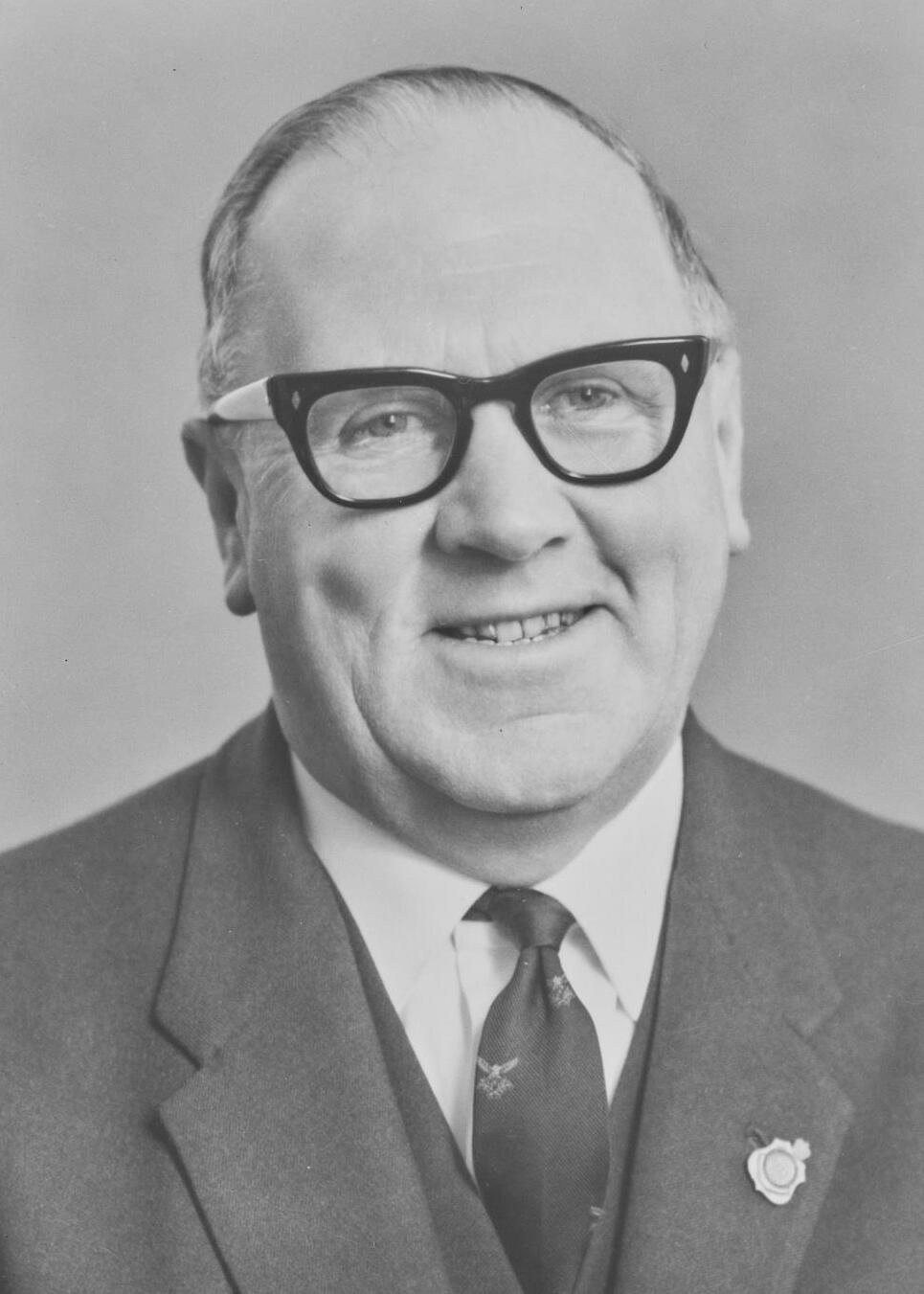
	First party	Second party
Leader	Eric Reece	Angus Bethune
Party	Labor	Liberal
Leader since	26 August 1958	19 March 1960
Leader's seat	Braddon	Wilmot
Last election	17 seats	16 seats
Seats won	19 seats	16 seats
Seat change	▲2	0
Percentage	51.32%	38.49%
Swing	▲6.82	▼2.57
- Results of the election
Premier before election
Eric Reece
Labor
Elected Premier
Eric Reece
Labor

The 1964 Tasmanian state election was held on 2 May 1964 in the Australian state of Tasmania to elect 35 members of the Tasmanian House of Assembly. The election used the Hare-Clark proportional representation system — seven members were elected from each of five electorates.

The Labor Party, in power since 1934, was seeking a tenth term in office, and Premier Eric Reece was contesting his second election in that role, this time against Leader of the Opposition Angus Bethune of the Liberal Party. Despite its longevity, the peculiarities of the Tasmanian Hare-Clark system meant it had served as a minority government with the support of independents since the 1946 election.

This is to date the last time that a sitting Premier, in Reece, has won back to back elections and was the first and only time that a Tasmanian Government won a tenth consecutive term in office.

== Results ==
Labor won a majority in the House of Assembly with 19 of the 35 seats. Dr Reg Turnbull, the former Labor treasurer who had won 27.9% as an independent in Bass in 1959 (equal to 5.64% of the statewide vote) departed in 1961 for the Australian Senate, with most of his vote returning to his former party.

Party	Votes	%	+/–	Seats	+/–
Labor	90,631	51.32	+6.82	19	▲2
Liberal	67,971	38.49	-2.57	16	Steady
Country	9,280	5.26	+5.26	0	Steady
Independents	5,462	3.09	-5.96	0	▼2
Democratic Labor	3,155	1.79	-3.50	0	Steady
Communist	92	0.05	-0.04	0	Steady
Total	176,591	100.00	–	35	–
Valid votes	176,591	95.68			
Invalid/blank votes	7,980	4.32	-1.44		
Total votes	184,571	100.00	–		
Registered voters/turnout	193,418	95.43	+0.86		

Popular vote
Labor	51.32%
Liberal	38.49%
Country	5.26%
DLP	1.79%
Communist	0.05%
Independents	3.09%

Seats
Labor	54.29%
Liberal	45.71%

== Distribution of votes ==
=== Primary vote by division ===
	Bass	Braddon	Denison	Franklin	Wilmot
Labor Party	49.9%	56.6%	44.0%	53.2%	52.3%
Liberal Party	41.2%	32.9%	44.9%	36.5%	37.5%
Other	9.0%	10.5%	11.1%	10.4%	10.3%

=== Distribution of seats ===
Electorate	Seats won
Bass	
Braddon	
Denison	
Franklin	
Wilmot	

Labor
Liberal

== See also ==
- Members of the Tasmanian House of Assembly, 1964–1969
- Candidates of the 1964 Tasmanian state election
