= Results of the 2025 Australian federal election in Tasmania =

Federal election results in Tasmania, Australia

2025 Australian federal election (Tasmania)
- 3 May 2025

All 5 Tasmanian seats in the Australian House of Representatives and 6 seats in the Australian Senate
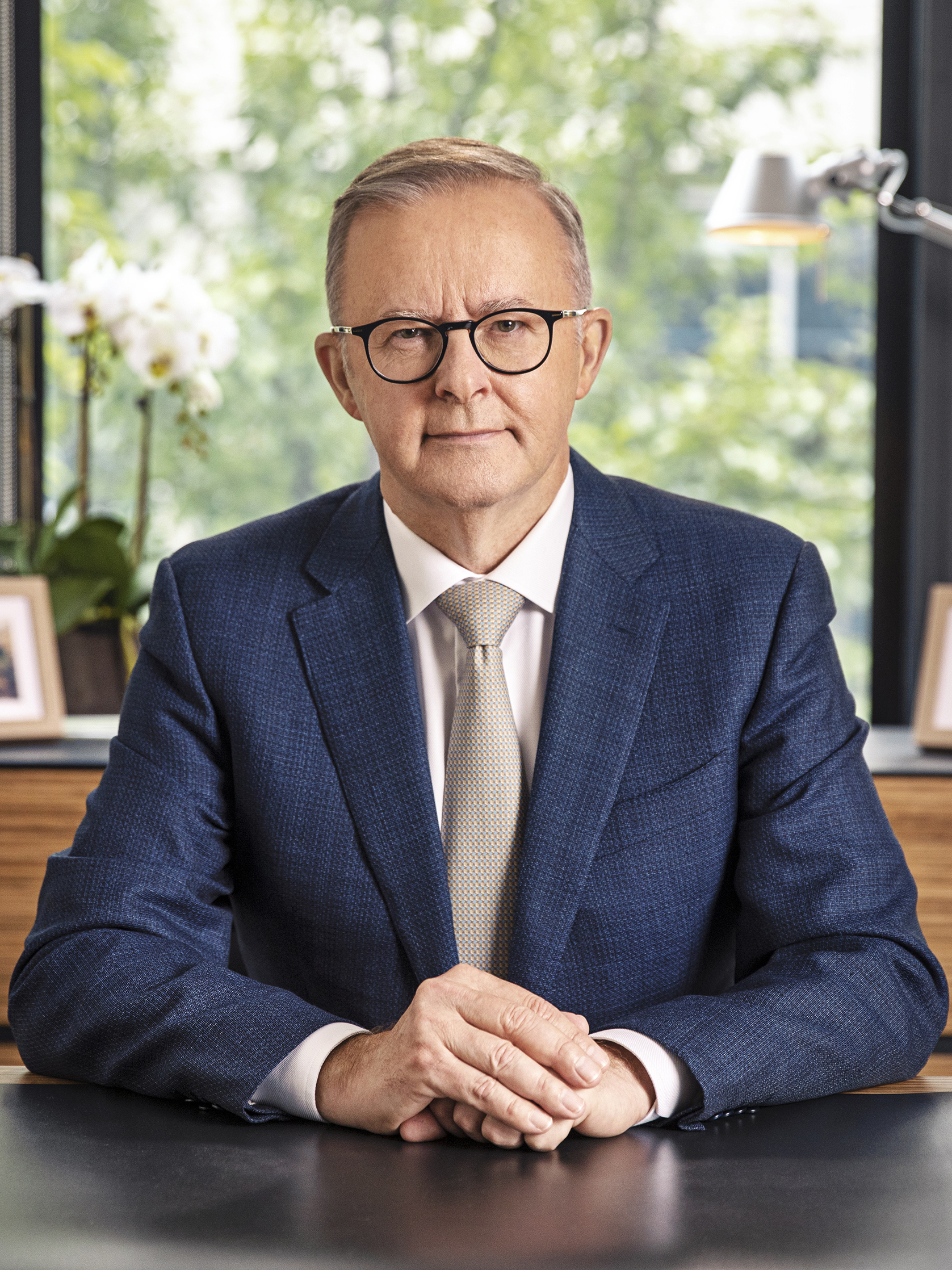

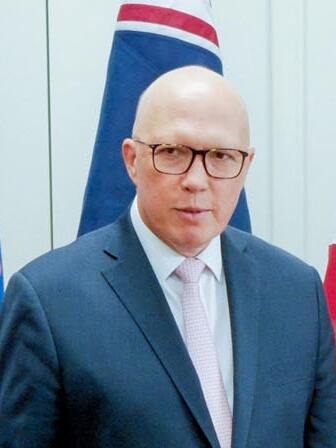
	First party	Second party
Leader	Anthony Albanese	Peter Dutton
Party	Labor	Liberal
Last election	2 seats	2 seats
Seats won	4	0
Seat change	▲2	▼2
Popular vote	134,435	89,988
Percentage	36.60%	24.50%
Swing	▲9.34	▼8.44
TPP	63.34%	36.66%
TPP swing	▲9.01	▼9.01
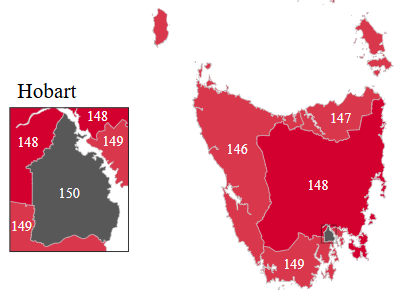

This is a list of electoral division results for the 2025 Australian federal election in the state of Tasmania.

Labor’s two-party preferred vote in Tasmania achieved a modern high-point at this election, reaching 63.3% after a swing of 9% from the Liberal Party. The seat of Braddon saw a record swing of 15%, the highest swing to Labor nationwide for the 2025 election.

== Overall results ==
House of Representatives (IRV) – Turnout 93.19% (CV)
Party	Votes	%	Swing (pp)	Seats	Change (seats)
Labor	134,435	36.60	+9.34	4	▲2
Liberal	89,988	24.50	−8.44	0	▼2
Greens	40,833	11.12	−0.88	0	Steady
One Nation	22,140	6.03	+2.04	0	Steady
Trumpet of Patriots	9,275	2.53	+2.53	0	Steady
Shooters, Fishers and Farmers	3,457	0.94	+0.94	0	Steady
Citizens	1,224	0.33	+0.33	0	Steady
Independent	65,907	17.95	+6.80	1	Steady
Total	367,259	100.00		5	Steady
Invalid/blank votes	16,316	4.25	−1.60	–	–
Turnout	383,575	93.19	+0.76	–	–
Registered voters	411,596	–	–	–	–
Two-party-preferred vote
Labor	232,624	63.34	+9.01	4	▲2
Liberal	134,635	36.66	−9.01	0	▼2
Source: AEC

== Results by division ==
=== Bass ===
2025 Australian federal election: Bass
Party	Candidate	Votes	%	±%
Labor	Jess Teesdale	28,375	39.63	+11.02
Liberal	Bridget Archer	22,511	31.44	−8.29
Greens	Charlene McLennan	9,229	12.89	+1.79
One Nation	Jordan Potter	4,639	6.48	+1.77
Independent	George Razay	3,852	5.38	+0.35
Trumpet of Patriots	Ray Broomhall	2,287	3.19	+3.19
Citizens	Caroline Larner	701	0.98	+0.98
Total formal votes		71,594	95.94	+1.87
Informal votes		3,031	4.06	−1.87
Turnout		74,625	92.84	+0.89
Two-party-preferred result
Labor	Jess Teesdale	41,532	58.01	+9.44
Liberal	Bridget Archer	30,062	41.99	−9.44
Labor gain from Liberal		Swing	+9.44	

=== Braddon ===
2025 Australian federal election: Braddon
Party	Candidate	Votes	%	±%
Labor	Anne Urquhart	29,579	39.52	+17.02
Liberal	Mal Hingston	23,700	31.67	−12.44
Greens	Erin Morrow	6,318	8.44	+1.72
Independent	Adam Martin	6,174	8.25	+8.25
One Nation	Christopher Methorst	5,709	7.63	+3.29
Trumpet of Patriots	Stephen Kenney	3,360	4.49	+4.49
Total formal votes		74,840	95.47	+3.13
Informal votes		3,553	4.53	−3.13
Turnout		78,393	93.05	+0.29
Two-party-preferred result
Labor	Anne Urquhart	42,809	57.20	+15.23
Liberal	Mal Hingston	32,031	42.80	−15.23
Labor gain from Liberal		Swing	+15.23	

=== Clark ===
2025 Australian federal election: Clark
Party	Candidate	Votes	%	±%
Independent	Andrew Wilkie	33,011	48.88	+3.34
Labor	Heidi Heck	13,539	20.05	+1.29
Liberal	Marilena Di Florio	9,239	13.68	−2.17
Greens	Janet Shelley	8,908	13.19	−0.26
One Nation	Cathy Griggs	2,834	4.20	+1.60
Total formal votes		67,531	97.58	+1.83
Informal votes		1,677	2.42	−1.83
Turnout		69,208	93.14	+1.01
Notional two-party-preferred count
Labor	Heidi Heck	47,871	70.89	+3.65
Liberal	Marilena Di Florio	19,660	29.11	−3.65
Two-candidate-preferred result
Independent	Andrew Wilkie	47,531	70.38	−0.44
Labor	Heidi Heck	20,000	29.62	+0.44
Independent hold		Swing	−0.44	

=== Franklin ===
2025 Australian federal election: Franklin
Party	Candidate	Votes	%	±%
Labor	Julie Collins	29,842	39.03	+2.34
Independent	Peter George	16,586	21.69	+21.69
Liberal	Josh Garvin	14,403	18.84	−7.89
Greens	Owen Fitzgerald (withdrew)	8,016	10.48	−6.88
Independent	Brendan Blomeley	3,822	5.00	+5.00
One Nation	Stefan Popescu	3,793	4.96	+2.11
Total formal votes		76,462	97.03	+1.96
Informal votes		2,340	2.97	−1.96
Turnout		78,802	94.16	+0.75
Notional two-party-preferred count
Labor	Julie Collins	53,096	69.44	+5.74
Liberal	Josh Garvin	23,366	30.56	−5.74
Two-candidate-preferred result
Labor	Julie Collins	44,179	57.78	−5.92
Independent	Peter George	32,283	42.22	+42.22
Labor hold				

=== Lyons ===
2025 Australian federal election: Lyons
Party	Candidate	Votes	%	±%
Labor	Rebecca White	33,100	43.08	+14.04
Liberal	Susie Bower	20,135	26.21	−11.01
Greens	Alistair Allan	8,362	10.88	−0.55
One Nation	Shaun Broadby	5,165	6.72	+1.37
Trumpet of Patriots	Sarah Graham	3,628	4.72	+4.72
Shooters, Fishers, Farmers	Carlo Di Falco	3,457	4.50	+4.50
Independent	Angela Offord	2,462	3.20	+3.20
Citizens	Michael Phibbs	523	0.68	+0.68
Total formal votes		76,832	93.08	−0.62
Informal votes		5,715	6.92	+0.62
Turnout		82,547	92.77	+0.87
Two-party-preferred result
Labor	Rebecca White	47,316	61.58	+10.66
Liberal	Susie Bower	29,516	38.42	−10.66
Labor hold		Swing	+10.66	
