= Leo McPartlan =

Australian politician

Leo Vincent McPartlan (2 August 1903 – June 1982) was an Australian politician.

He was born in Hobart. In 1953 he was elected to the Tasmanian House of Assembly for Denison in a countback following the resignation of Bill Wedd. McPartlan, like Wedd, was an independent. In 1955 he contested Franklin, but was defeated.
