= 1955 Tasmanian state election =

State election in Australia

- 19 February 1955

All 30 seats to the House of Assembly
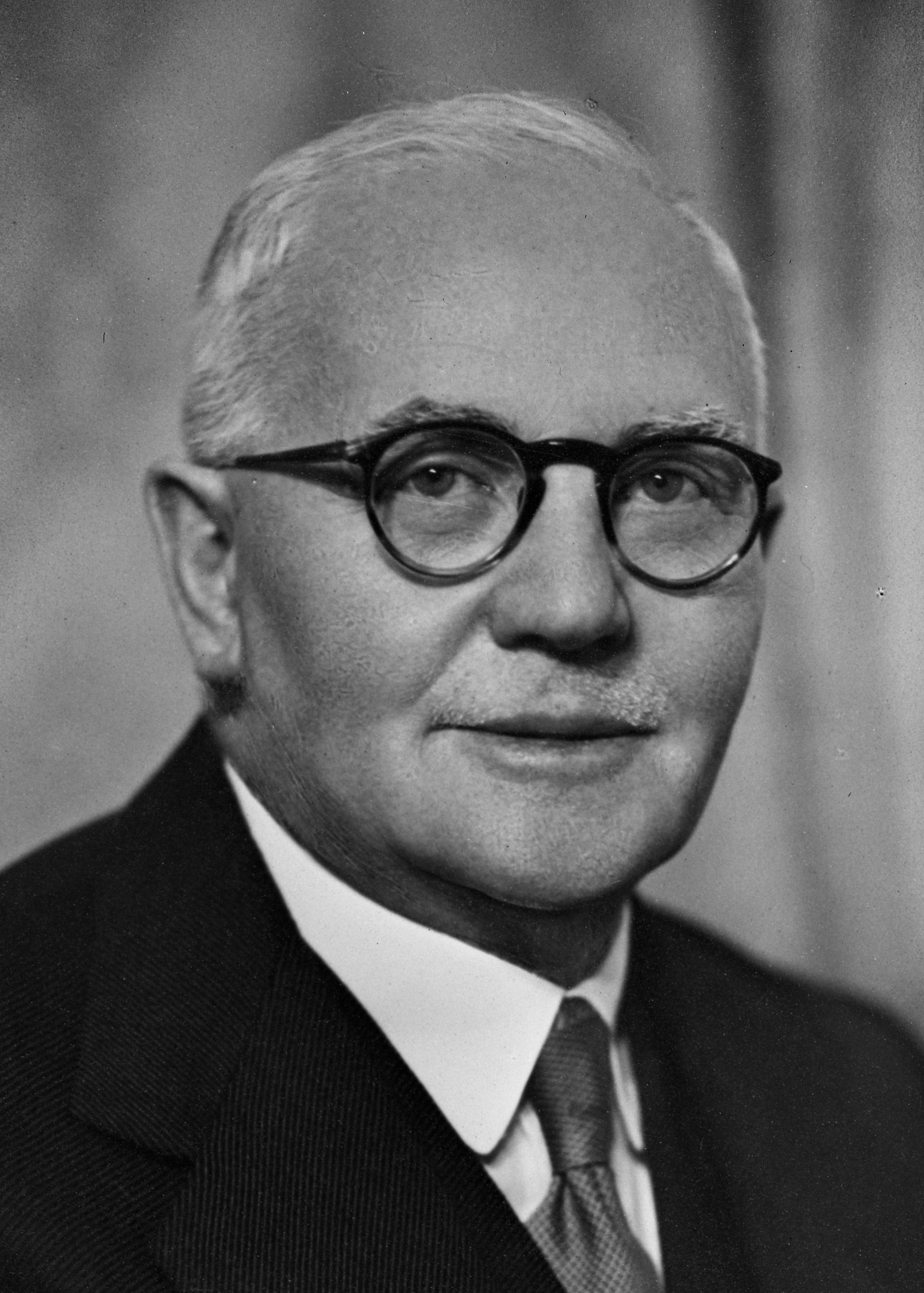

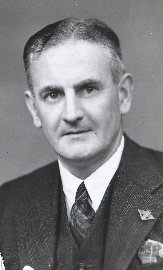
	First party	Second party
Leader	Robert Cosgrove	Rex Townley
Party	Labor	Liberal
Leader since	25 February 1948	6 February 1950
Leader's seat	Denison	Denison
Last election	15 seats	14 seats
Seats won	15 seats	15 seats
Seat change	0	▲1
Percentage	52.63%	45.35%
Swing	▲4.00	▼2.23
- Results of the election
Premier before election
Robert Cosgrove
Labor
Resulting Premier
Robert Cosgrove
Labor

The 1955 Tasmanian state election was held on 19 February 1955 in the Australian state of Tasmania to elect 30 members of the Tasmanian House of Assembly. The election used the Hare-Clark proportional representation system — six members were elected from each of five electorates.

The incumbent Labor government, led by Robert Cosgrove, had been in office continuously since 1934, although had not held a majority since 1946. It was looking to win another term in minority government against the opposition Liberal Party, on this occasion led by Rex Townley.

The election resulted in a parliamentary deadlock, with both the Labor and Liberal parties winning 15 seats in the 30 seat assembly.

The 1955 election also saw the first women elected to the House of Assembly: Mabel Miller for Franklin and Amelia Best for Wilmot, both members of the Liberal Party.

== Background and deadlock provisions ==
The 1955 election was the first to be held since the passage of a 1954 amendment to the constitution in relation to political deadlocks. The amendment provided that, in the event of a deadlock in the 30-member House of Assembly, an Electoral Commission would be convened to determine a "majority party" and "minority party" on the basis of primary votes. The minority party would then have the right to nominate a member as Speaker of the Tasmanian House of Assembly, thereby giving the majority party a working majority of one MP. If the minority party did not nominate a speaker, the majority party would be entitled to nominate one of its own members as speaker and also to be awarded a supplementary member of parliament, again giving the majority party a working majority on the speaker's casting vote.

== Results ==
Party	Votes	%	+/–	Seats	+/–
Labor	82,362	52.63	+4.00	15	Steady
Liberal	70,959	45.35	-2.23	15	▲1
Independents	3,158	2.02	-1.72	0	▼1
Total	156,479	100.00	–	30	–
Valid votes	156,479	96.21			
Invalid/blank votes	6,158	3.79	-0.69		
Total votes	162,637	100.00	–		
Registered voters/turnout	173,165	93.92	-0.60		

Popular vote
Labor	52.63%
Liberal	45.35%
Independents	2.02%

Seats
Labor	50.00%
Liberal	50.00%

== Distribution of votes ==
=== Primary vote by division ===
	Bass	Braddon	Denison	Franklin	Wilmot
Labor Party	53.5%	53.3%	50.8%	49.9%	55.7%
Liberal Party	46.0%	46.7%	42.5%	46.5%	44.3%
Other	0.5%	—	6.7%	3.5%	—

=== Distribution of seats ===
Electorate	Seats won
Bass	
Darwin	
Denison	
Franklin	
Wilmot	

Labor
Liberal

== See also ==
- Members of the Tasmanian House of Assembly, 1955–1956
- Candidates of the 1955 Tasmanian state election
