= 1946 Tasmanian state election =

State election in Australia

- 23 November 1946

All 30 seats to the House of Assembly
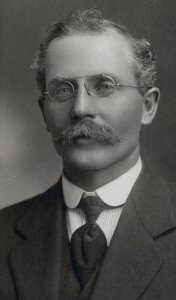

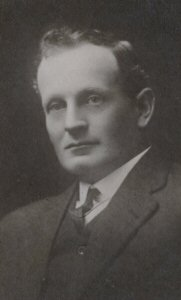
	First party	Second party
Leader	Robert Cosgrove	Neil Campbell
Party	Labor	Liberal
Leader since	18 December 1939	February 1945
Leader's seat	Denison	Wilmot
Last election	20 seats	10 seats
Seats won	16 seats	12 seats
Seat change	▼4	▲2
Percentage	50.97%	34.25%
Swing	▼11.63	▼2.33
- Results of the election
Premier before election
Robert Cosgrove
Labor
Elected Premier
Robert Cosgrove
Labor

The 1946 Tasmanian state election was held on 23 November 1946 in the Australian state of Tasmania to elect 30 members of the Tasmanian House of Assembly. The election used the Hare-Clark proportional representation system — six members were elected from each of five electorates.

Incumbent Premier Robert Cosgrove continued to lead the Labor Party into the 1946 election. The Nationalist Party had reformed into the modern Liberal Party, and was led by Neil Campbell. This was Tasmania's first election since the end of World War II.

Labor won a majority in the election, although the party's vote was significantly reduced. Cosgrove dominated the government throughout Tasmania's post-war recovery.

== Results ==
Party	Votes	%	+/–	Seats	+/–
Labor	65,843	51.00	-11.63	16	▼4
Liberal	44,158	34.20	-2.33	12	▲2
Ind. Lib.^{[a]}	11,339	8.78	+8.78	1	▲1
Independents	7,765	6.01	+5.18	1	▲1
Total	129,105	100.00	–	30	–
Valid votes	129,105	89.91			
Invalid/blank votes	14,484	10.09	+5.09		
Total votes	143,589	100.00	–		
Registered voters/turnout	157,756	91.02	-0.16		

Popular vote
Labor	50.97%
Liberal	34.25%
Independents	14.79%

Seats
Labor	53.33%
Liberal	40.00%
Independents	6.67%

^{a} Several Nationalists did not join the new Liberal Party and ran as independents. Rex Townley was elected in Denison.

== Distribution of votes ==
=== Primary vote by division ===
	Bass	Darwin	Denison	Franklin	Wilmot
Labor Party	57.9%	49.5%	45.3%	51.5%	51.2%
Liberal Party	31.9%	47.7%	19.4%	35.2%	36.3%
Other	10.3%	2.9%	35.4%	13.3%	12.5%

=== Distribution of seats ===
Electorate	Seats won
Bass	
Darwin	
Denison	
Franklin	
Wilmot	

Labor
Liberal
Independent

== See also ==
- Members of the Tasmanian House of Assembly, 1946–1948
- Candidates of the 1946 Tasmanian state election
