= 1969 Tasmanian state election =

State election in Australia

- 10 May 1969

All 35 seats to the House of Assembly
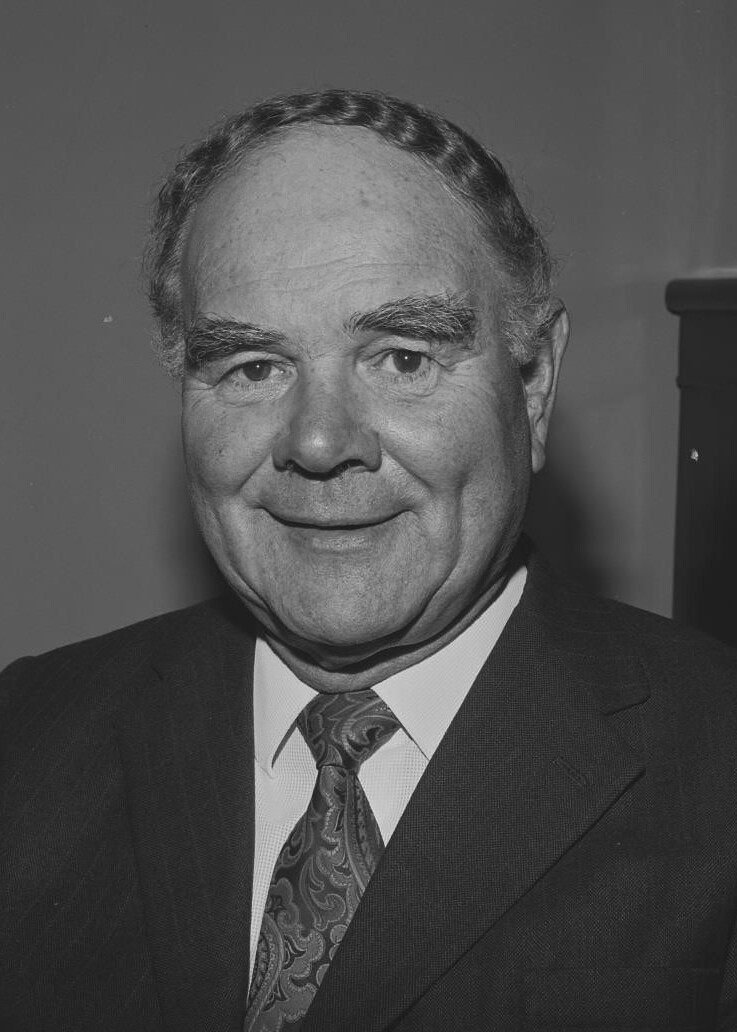

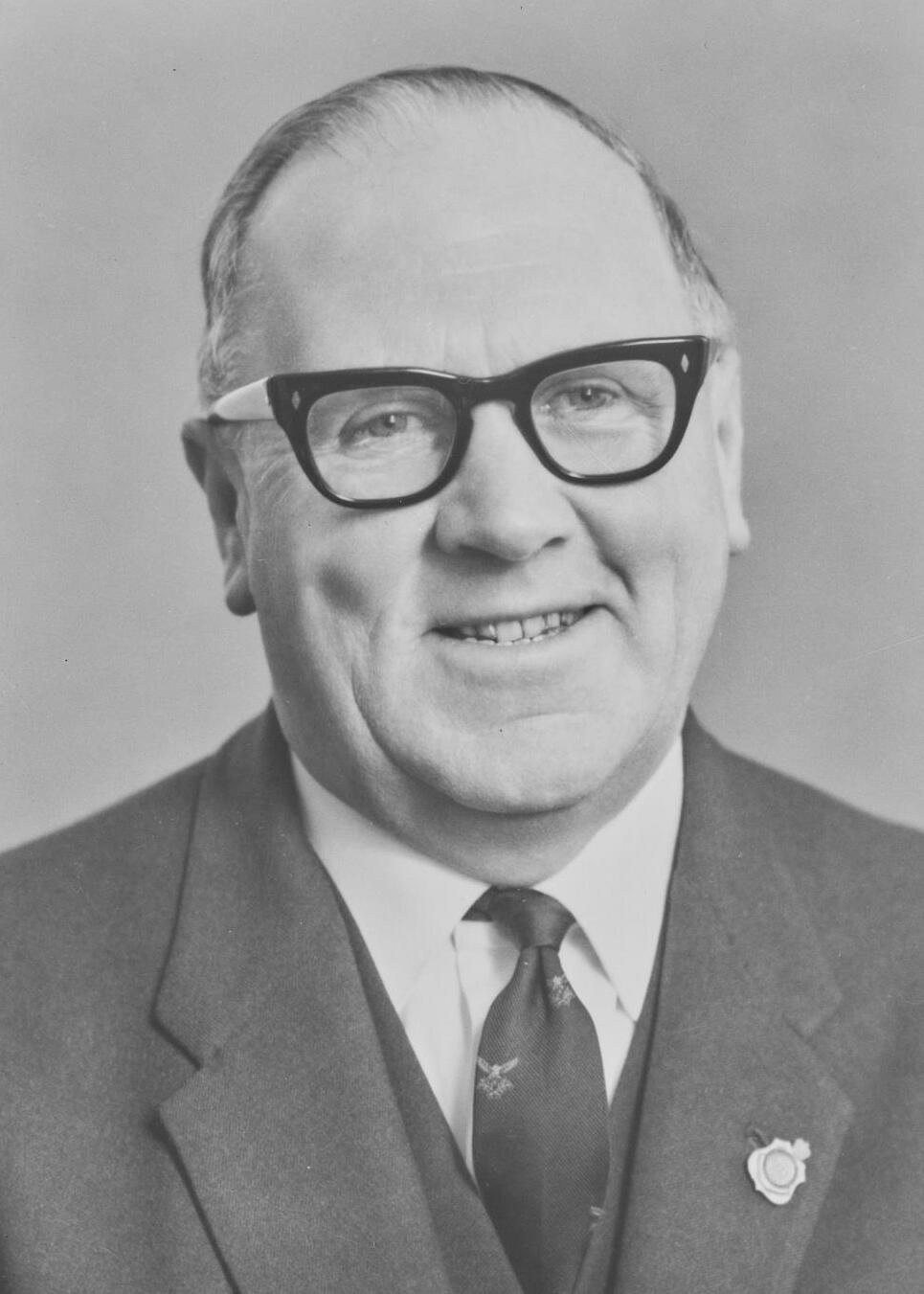

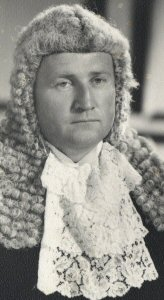
	First party	Second party	Third party
Leader	Eric Reece	Angus Bethune	Kevin Lyons
Party	Labor	Liberal	Centre
Leader since	26 August 1958	19 March 1960	1969
Leader's seat	Braddon	Wilmot	Braddon
Last election	19 seats	16 seats	0 seats
Seats won	17	17	1
Seat change	▼2	▲1	▲1
Popular vote	90,278	83,261	8,160
Percentage	47.68%	43.98%	4.31%
Swing	▼3.64	▲5.49	▼0.94
- Results of the election
Premier before election
Eric Reece
Labor
Resulting Premier
Angus Bethune
Liberal

The 1969 Tasmanian state election was held on 10 May 1969 in the Australian state of Tasmania to elect 35 members of the Tasmanian House of Assembly. The election used the Hare-Clark proportional representation system — seven members were elected from each of five electorates.

The incumbent Labor Party, which had been in power continuously since 1934, was led by Eric Reece, who had been premier of Tasmania since 1958. The opposition Liberal Party was led by Angus Bethune.

The election resulted in a hung parliament, with the Labor and Liberal parties on 17 seats each (out of 35). The balance of power was held by Kevin Lyons, a former Liberal who had quit the party in 1966 after a dispute over preselection and formed the Centre Party. Lyons approached Bethune with an offer for a coalition government with himself as Deputy Premier. Bethune agreed, allowing him to form government by one seat—thus consigning Labor to opposition for the first time in 35 years.

== Results ==
Party	Votes	%	+/–	Seats	+/–
Labor	90,278	47.68	▼3.64	17	▼2
Liberal	83,261	43.98	▲5.49	17	▲1
Centre Party^{[a]}	8,160	4.31	▼0.94	1	▲1
Independents	4,366	2.31	▼0.79	0	Steady
Democratic Labor	3,258	1.72	▼0.07	0	Steady
Total	189,323	100.00	–	35	–
Valid votes	189,323	95.34			
Invalid/blank votes	9,248	4.66	▲0.34		
Total votes	198,571	100.00	–		
Registered voters/turnout	210,268	94.44	▼0.99		

Popular vote
Labor	47.68%
Liberal	43.98%
Centre Party	4.31%
Labor (Anti-Communist)	1.72%
Independents	2.31%

Seats
Labor	48.57%
Liberal	48.57%
Centre Party	2.89%

^{a} The Centre Party was composed out of the former Country Party in Tasmania, and was supported by federal Country MPs.

== Distribution of votes ==
=== Primary vote by division ===
	Bass	Braddon	Denison	Franklin	Wilmot
Labor Party	42.4%	53.7%	43.7%	52.1%	46.5%
Liberal Party	46.2%	34.4%	47.4%	44.2%	48.0%
Other	11.5%	11.9%	8.9%	3.7%	5.5%

=== Distribution of seats ===
Electorate	Seats won
Bass	
Braddon	
Denison	
Franklin	
Wilmot	

Labor
Liberal
Centre

== Aftermath ==
The Liberal-Centre coalition lasted for one term, with Lyons dissolving the partnership in 1972. The resulting instability triggered an election, which was easily won by Eric Reece and the Labor Party.

== See also ==
- Members of the Tasmanian House of Assembly, 1969–1972
- Candidates of the 1969 Tasmanian state election
