= Tim Jackson (politician) =

Australian politician (1907–1975)

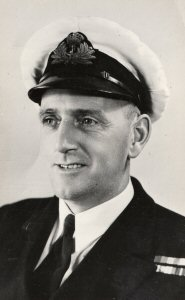
- Jackson c. 1946

Leader of the Opposition in Tasmania
- In office 26 June 1956 – 19 March 1960
- Preceded by: Reginald Townley
- Succeeded by: Angus Bethune

Personal details
- Born: 28 October 1907 Dover, Tasmania, Australia
- Died: 19 February 1975 (aged 67) Hobart, Tasmania, Australia
- Party: Liberal
- Spouse: Nancy Eady (m. 1932)
- Occupation: Fruit-grower; Naval officer

William "Tim" Jackson (28 October 1907 – 19 February 1975) was an Australian politician. He was leader of the Liberal Party in Tasmania and leader of the opposition from 1956 to 1960. He was a naval officer during World War II.

== Early life ==
Jackson was born on 28 October 1907 in Dover, Tasmania. He was the first of five children born to Maud (née Bush) and William Jackson. His parents had immigrated from England to Tasmania where his father became an orchardist.

Jackson attended The Hutchins School in Hobart, returning to Dover where he became a fruit and vegetable grower. He was managing director of Port Huon Fruit Growers and also served on the Esperance Municipal Council from 1933 to 1934.

In 1940, Jackson was commissioned as a sub-lieutenant in the Royal Australian Naval Volunteer Reserve and was sent to Britain for further training with the Royal Navy under the Dominion Yachtsmen Scheme. He served on HMS Wanderer as a navigational officer from 1940 to 1943, then returned to Australia and joined HMAS Kapunda as first lieutenant from January to August 1944. Jackson took command of the minesweeper HMAS Bendigo in October 1944, joining the British Pacific Fleet. He finished the war with the rank of acting lieutenant commander.

== Politics ==
After being demobilised from the navy, Jackson was elected to the Tasmanian House of Assembly at the 1946 state election, running for the Liberal Party in the seat of Franklin.

Jackson was elected deputy leader of the Liberal Party in 1951 and succeeded Reginald Townley as party leader and opposition leader in June 1956. Only months later, Australian Labor Party (ALP) cabinet minister Carrol Bramich defected from the ALP to the Liberals, giving Jackson and Liberals a 16–14 majority in the House of Assembly. However, state governor Ronald Cross refused to commission Jackson as premier and instead granted the request of incumbent ALP premier Robert Cosgrove for a dissolution. The resulting election ended in a deadlock with Cosgrove continuing as premier.

At the 1959 state election, Jackson again failed to gain a majority for the Liberals, with Labor governing in minority with the support of independents. Following internal pressure from the party's state executive, he resigned as party leader on 19 March 1960 and along with Bill Hodgman chose to leave the parliamentary party to sit as "independent Liberals". He was not re-elected at the 1964 state election.

== Personal life ==
In 1932, Jackson married Nancy Eady, with whom he had two children. He died in Hobart on 19 February 1975, aged 67.

Jackson grew prize-winning daffodils, a practice started by his father in the 1920s. He hybridised a number of new variety, growing thousands of seedlings each year and exporting bulbs overseas under the Jackson's Daffodils brand. He specialised in pink daffodils and won five national championships.

Parliament of Tasmania
Preceded by Rex Townley	Leader of the Opposition; 1956–1960	Succeeded by Angus Bethune
