= Rex Townley =

Australian politician

Rex Townley MPS, PhC
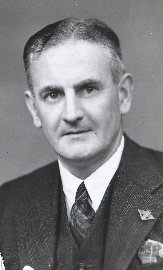

Leader of the Opposition in Tasmania
- In office 6 February 1950 – 26 June 1956
- Preceded by: Neil Campbell
- Succeeded by: Tim Jackson
- Constituency: Denison

Personal details
- Born: 15 April 1904 Hobart, Tasmania
- Died: 3 May 1982 (aged 78) Hobart
- Party: Liberal

Reginald Colin "Rex" Townley CMG (15 April 1904 – 3 May 1982) was an Australian politician who served as leader of the Liberal Party in Tasmania from 1950 to 1956. He also played first-class cricket for the Tasmanian cricket team in his younger years, dismissing Donald Bradman in the 1935 season.

== Cricket career ==
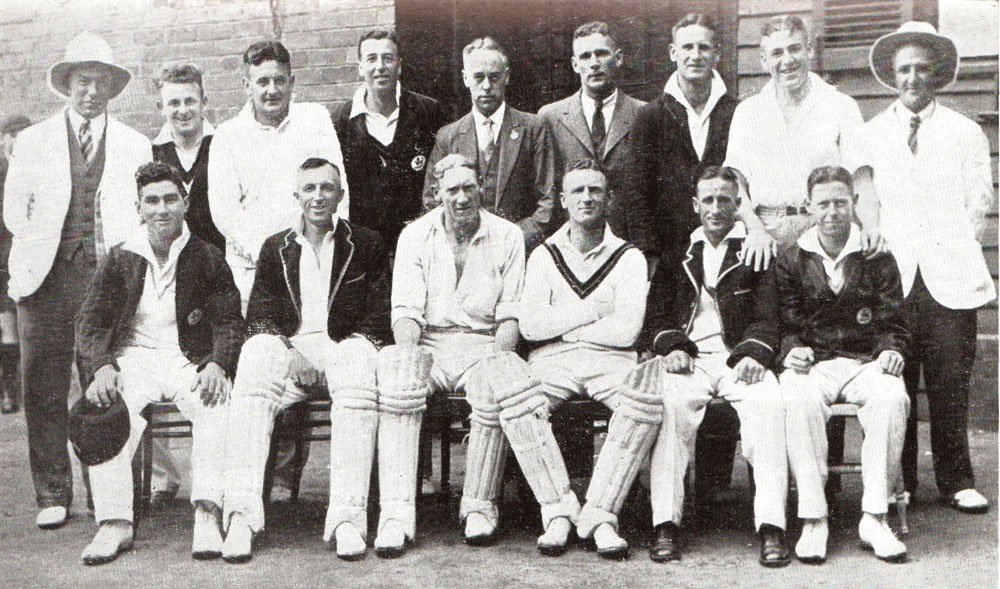
The Tasmanian team that played the South Africans at Hobart in January 1932. Rex Townley is standing third from left.

As Tasmania didn't compete in the Sheffield Shield at the time of his cricketing career, Townley's appearances for his state were limited to matches against touring sides such as the Marylebone Cricket Club and South Africa as well as out of season first-class fixtures against other Australian states.

Rex Townley
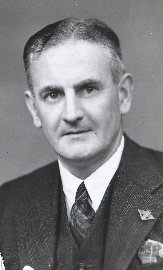

Personal information
- Full name: Reginald Colin Townley
- Batting: Right-handed
- Bowling: Right-arm leg-spin

Domestic team information
- Years: Team
- 1926-27 – 1935-36: Tasmania

Career statistics
Competition	First-class
Matches	16
Runs scored	175
Batting average	8.75
100s/50s	–/–
Top score	24 not out
Balls bowled	1574
Wickets	36
Bowling average	35.52
5 wickets in innings	–
10 wickets in match	–
Best bowling	4/111
Catches/stumpings	5/–
- Source: Cricket Archive, 27 October 2013

A legbreak bowler, Townley took 36 wickets at 35.52 in first-class matches. His claim to fame as a cricketer was dismissing Donald Bradman, caught and bowled for 369, in a first-class match against South Australia, the legendary batsman's second highest ever score at that level. He also claimed in his career the wickets of English Test cricketer Ernest Tyldesley and South African Test player Bruce Mitchell.

== Political career ==
Like his younger brother Athol, the Australian Minister for Defence from 1958 to 1963, Townley went into politics. He joined the Tasmanian House of Assembly at the 1946 election as an Independent, representing Denison.

The Liberal Party installed Townley as their leader for the 1950 election but lost to incumbent Premier Robert Cosgrove, despite achieving a 9.8% swing. With the Liberals regaining two seats which had been held by Independents since 1948, Labor stayed in power only thanks to the support of the remaining Independent, Bill Wedd.

Townley also led the Liberals into the 1955 election and picked up a seat to leave the House of Assembly with a deadlock as both parties had 15 seats out of a possible 30 in the assembly. Cosgrove however remained as Premier of Tasmania.

On 30 June 1965, Townley resigned from parliament, having never failed to defend his seat in an election.

== See also ==
- List of Tasmanian representative cricketers

Parliament of Tasmania
Preceded by Neil Campbell	Leader of the Opposition; 1950–1956	Succeeded by Tim Jackson
