= Tasmanian Liberal Party =

Tasmanian Liberal Party Liberal Party of Australia (Tasmanian Division)
- Abbreviation: LP; LIB
- Leader: Jeremy Rockliff
- President: Michael McKenna
- General Secretary: Peter Coulson
- Deputy Leader: Guy Barnett
- Senior Vice President: Don Morris
- Treasurer: Rod Bramich
- Young Liberal President: Thomas Ferguson
- Founded: 13 February 1945; 81 years ago
- Headquarters: Suite 4C, Level 3, 33 Salamanca Place, Hobart TAS 7000
- Student wing: University of Tasmania Liberal Club
- Youth wing: Young Liberals
- Women's wing: Liberal Women's Council
- Ideology: Conservatism (Australian); Liberalism (Australian); Liberal conservatism
- Political position: Centre-right
- National affiliation: Liberal Party of Australia
- Colours: Blue
- Slogan: Securing Tasmania’s Future
- House of Reps (Tas. seats): 0 / 5
- Senate (Tas. seats): 4 / 12
- House of Assembly: 14 / 35
- Legislative Council: 3 / 15

Website
- tas.liberal.org.au

Seats in local government
- Clarence City: 2 / 12
- Derwent Valley: 1 / 8
- Latrobe: 1 / 9

The Tasmanian Liberal Party, officially known as the Liberal Party of Australia (Tasmanian Division) and more simply as the Tasmanian Liberals, is the state division of the Liberal Party of Australia in Tasmania.

The incumbent premier of Tasmania is Jeremy Rockliff, who has served as the Liberal leader since 2022.

== History ==
In 1904, Elliott Lewis established the National League, which changed its name to the Progressive League in 1907. While Lewis became Premier of the state in 1909 under this banner, the League itself shortly disappeared. Its successor was the Tasmanian Liberal League, founded later that year in collaboration with the Tasmanian Farmers and Stockowners Association. In 1917, the League affiliated with the Australian Liberal Union.

Following the removal of Billy Hughes from the leadership of the Labor Party, the League merged again to become the Tasmanian National Federation. It shared government with the Labor Party from 1912 to 1923, and then from 1928 to 1934. Despite the establishment of the United Australia Party by Joseph Lyons, the party continued using the name National until 1941 when it changed its name to the 'United Australia and National Organisation'. In 1945 the party came under the umbrella of the new Liberal Party of Australia.

The Tasmanian Division of the party was formed at a meeting in Hobart on 13 February 1945. The first state candidates stood at the 1946 election, most of whom were ex-servicemen. The organisation recruited them by arguing that in the services they had been fighting for freedom, and it was now their duty 'to finish the job'. The party first formed a government in Tasmania 1969.

In 1982, Robin Gray was elected on a platform of commitment to building the Gordon-below-Franklin hydro-electric power scheme. Continual blockades from the Labor Federal Government lead to the Premier threatening to secede from the Commonwealth if any further intervention was taken. Despite the lack of success in the Tasmanian Dam Case, the Gray government won the 1986 state election and held onto power until 1989.

The party was elected at the 1992 state election with Ray Groom as leader, however at the subsequent 1996 election following a promise not to form minority government Groom resigned. Tony Rundle was quick to replace Groom as Liberal leader and reached an informal agreement with the Tasmanian Greens to secure support.

At the 2014 state election, Will Hodgman secured a majority of seats following a 16-year incumbent Labor government led by Lara Giddings. The party was re-elected at the 2018 state election. Hodgman retired from politics in January 2020 and was succeeded by Peter Gutwein as party leader and Premier. On 22 March 2021, lower house MP Sue Hickey announced that she would quit the Liberal Party and sit as an independent, slamming the state Liberals as "unable to accommodate strong women" after being told by Gutwein that she would not be endorsed for the next election. The Liberal government lost its majority and plunged into minority government. The party was re-elected at the May 2021 state election and regained majority government status. In April 2022, Gutwein retired from politics and was succeeded by his deputy Jeremy Rockliff as party leader and Premier.

== Organisation ==
Each division of the Liberal Party is autonomous, with a unique organisational structure and their own constitutions.

== Premiers ==
Seven parliamentary Liberal leaders have served as Premier of Tasmania:

- Angus Bethune (1969–1972)
- Robin Gray (1982–1989)
- Ray Groom (1992–1996)
- Tony Rundle (1996–1998)
- Will Hodgman (2014–2020)
- Peter Gutwein (2020–2022)
- Jeremy Rockliff (2022–present)

== Deputy Premiers ==
Eight parliamentary Liberal deputy leaders have served as Deputy Premier of Tasmania:

- Max Bingham (1982–1984)
- Geoff Pearsall (1984–1988)
- Ray Groom (1988–1989)
- John Beswick (1992–1996)
- Sue Napier (1996–1998)
- Jeremy Rockliff (2014–2022)
- Michael Ferguson (2022–2024)
- Guy Barnett (2024–present)

== List of parliamentary leaders ==
- Neil Campbell (1945–1950)
- Rex Townley (1950–1956)
- Tim Jackson (1956–1960)
- Angus Bethune (1960–1972)
- Max Bingham (1972–1979)
- Geoff Pearsall (1979–1981)
- Robin Gray (1981–1991)
- Ray Groom (1991–1996)
- Tony Rundle (1996–1999)
- Sue Napier (1999–2001)
- Bob Cheek (2001–2002)
- Rene Hidding (2002–2006)
- Will Hodgman (2006–2020)
- Peter Gutwein (2020–2022)
- Jeremy Rockliff (2022–present)

== Election results ==
=== House of Assembly ===
Election	Leader	Votes	%	Seats	+/–	Position	Status
1946	Neil Campbell	44,158	34.25	12 / 30	▲2	2nd	Opposition
1948	Neil Campbell	54,010	37.84	12 / 30	0	2nd	Opposition
1950	Rex Townley	69,429	47.57	14 / 30	▲2	2nd	Opposition
1955	Rex Townley	70,959	45.35	15 / 30	▲1	2nd	Opposition
1956	Tim Jackson	69,477	43.61	15 / 30	0	2nd	Opposition
1959	Tim Jackson	66,005	41.05	16 / 35	▲1	2nd	Opposition
1964	Angus Bethune	67,971	38.49	16 / 35	0	2nd	Opposition
1969	Angus Bethune	83,261	43.98	17 / 35	▲1	2nd	Minority
1972	Angus Bethune	76,073	38.37	14 / 35	▼3	2nd	Opposition
1976	Max Bingham	104,613	44.5	17 / 35	▲3	2nd	Opposition
1979	Max Bingham	98,845	41.3	15 / 35	▼2	2nd	Opposition
1982	Robin Gray	121,346	48.5	18 / 35	▲3	▲1st	Majority
1986	Robin Gray	138,836	54.2	18 / 35	0	1st	Majority
1989	Robin Gray	128,143	46.9	17 / 35	▼1	1st	Opposition
1992	Ray Groom	154,337	54.1	19 / 35	▲2	1st	Majority
1996	Ray Groom	121,391	41.2	16 / 35	▼3	1st	Minority
1998	Tony Rundle	112,146	38.1	10 / 25	▼6	▼2nd	Opposition
2002	Bob Cheek	81,185	27.4	7 / 25	▼3	2nd	Opposition
2006	Rene Hidding	98,511	31.8	7 / 25	0	2nd	Opposition
2010	Will Hodgman	124,933	39.0	10 / 25	▲3	▲1st	Opposition
2014	Will Hodgman	167,051	51.2	15 / 25	▲5	1st	Majority
2018	Will Hodgman	168,303	50.3	13 / 25	▼2	1st	Majority
2021	Peter Gutwein	166,315	48.7	13 / 25	0	1st	Majority
2024	Jeremy Rockliff	127,837	36.7	14 / 35	▲1	1st	Minority
2025	Jeremy Rockliff	139,586	39.9	14 / 35	0	1st	Minority

=== House of Representatives ===
Election	Seats won	±	Total TPP votes	%	Position	Leader
2010	0 / 5	0	128,830	39.38%	Opposition	Tony Abbott
2013	3 / 5	▲3	161,086	48.77%	Government	Tony Abbott
2016	0 / 5	▼3	143,093	42.64%	Government	Malcolm Turnbull
2019	2 / 5	▲2	153,246	44.04%	Government	Scott Morrison
2022	2 / 5	0	159,705	45.67%	Opposition	Scott Morrison
2025	0 / 5	▼2	134,635	36.66%	Opposition	Peter Dutton
