= Bill Wedd =

Australian politician

William George Wedd (17 March 1909 – 30 May 1995) was an Australian politician and member of the Tasmanian House of Assembly and Tasmanian Legislative Council. He was Speaker of the Tasmanian House of Assembly from 13 September 1949 to 6 June 1950.

== Early life ==
Bill Wedd was born in North Lyell in western Tasmania, and was educated at Linda School in western Tasmania and Moonah State School near Hobart. His parents were John Wedd and Bridget Bedelia Henry.

== Political career ==
Wedd was elected to the Tasmanian Legislative Council on 2 May 1944 as an independent, representing the seat of Buckingham. He resigned to successfully contest the Tasmanian House of Assembly seat of Denison. He resigned on 24 October 1953, and unsuccessfully contested his old Legislative Council seat in 1956, but returned to successfully contest the Tasmanian House of Assembly seat of Denison on 2 May 1959. He was defeated at the 1964 Tasmanian House of Assembly election.

== After politics ==
Wedd died after a short illness on 30 May 1995 in Hobart, aged 86.

Tasmanian Legislative Council
Preceded by Thomas Murdoch	Member for Buckingham; 1944–1948	Succeeded by James Connolly
