= Electoral results for the Division of Franklin =

Australian division election results

This is a list of electoral results for the Division of Franklin in Australian federal elections from the division's creation in 1903 until the present.

== Members ==
Member	Party	Term
William McWilliams	Revenue Tariff	1903–1906
William McWilliams	Anti-Socialist	1906–1909
William McWilliams	Liberal	1909–1917
William McWilliams	Nationalist	1917–1920
William McWilliams	Country	1920–1922
Alfred Seabrook	Nationalist	1922–1928
William McWilliams	Independent	1928–1929
Charles Frost	Labor	1929 by–1931
Archibald Blacklow	United Australia	1931–1934
Charles Frost	Labor	1934–1946
Bill Falkinder	Liberal	1946–1966
Thomas Pearsall	Liberal	1966–1969
Ray Sherry	Labor	1969–1975
Bruce Goodluck	Liberal	1975–1993
Harry Quick	Labor	1993–2007
Harry Quick	Independent	2007
Julie Collins	Labor	2007–present

== Election results ==
=== Elections in the 2020s ===
==== 2025 ====
2025 Australian federal election: Franklin
Party	Candidate	Votes	%	±%
Labor	Julie Collins	29,842	39.03	+2.34
Independent	Peter George	16,586	21.69	+21.69
Liberal	Josh Garvin	14,403	18.84	−7.89
Greens	Owen Fitzgerald (withdrew)	8,016	10.48	−6.88
Independent	Brendan Blomeley	3,822	5.00	+5.00
One Nation	Stefan Popescu	3,793	4.96	+2.11
Total formal votes		76,462	97.03	+1.96
Informal votes		2,340	2.97	−1.96
Turnout		78,802	94.16	+0.75
Notional two-party-preferred count
Labor	Julie Collins	53,096	69.44	+5.74
Liberal	Josh Garvin	23,366	30.56	−5.74
Two-candidate-preferred result
Labor	Julie Collins	44,179	57.78	−5.92
Independent	Peter George	32,283	42.22	+42.22
Labor hold				

==== 2022 ====
2022 Australian federal election: Franklin
Party	Candidate	Votes	%	±%
Labor	Julie Collins	26,147	36.69	−7.30
Liberal	Kristy Johnson	19,048	26.73	−4.54
Greens	Jade Darko	12,370	17.36	+1.11
Lambie	Chris Hannan	4,215	5.92	+5.92
Local	Anna Bateman	3,535	4.96	+4.96
One Nation	Steve Hindley	2,033	2.85	+2.85
Liberal Democrats	Duane Pitt	1,434	2.01	+2.01
United Australia	Lisa Matthews	1,380	1.94	−4.76
Animal Justice	Katrina Love	1,097	1.54	+1.54
Total formal votes		71,259	95.07	−1.78
Informal votes		3,696	4.93	+1.78
Turnout		74,955	93.41	−1.27
Two-party-preferred result
Labor	Julie Collins	45,392	63.70	+1.49
Liberal	Kristy Johnson	25,867	36.30	−1.49
Labor hold		Swing	+1.49	

Alluvial diagram for preference flows in the seat of Franklin in the 2022 federal election. indicates at what stage the winning candidate had over 50% of the votes and was declared the winner.

=== Elections in the 2010s ===
==== 2019 ====
2019 Australian federal election: Franklin
Party	Candidate	Votes	%	±%
Labor	Julie Collins	30,911	43.99	−2.86
Liberal	Dean Young	21,969	31.27	−3.95
Greens	Kit Darko	11,420	16.25	+2.72
United Australia	Darren Winter	4,704	6.70	+6.70
Conservative National	Darren Hawes	1,257	1.79	+1.79
Total formal votes		70,261	96.85	+0.26
Informal votes		2,284	3.15	−0.26
Turnout		72,545	94.68	+0.80
Two-party-preferred result
Labor	Julie Collins	43,706	62.21	+1.48
Liberal	Dean Young	26,555	37.79	−1.48
Labor hold		Swing	+1.48	

==== 2016 ====
2016 Australian federal election: Franklin
Party	Candidate	Votes	%	±%
Labor	Julie Collins	32,724	47.01	+7.08
Liberal	Amanda-Sue Markham	24,542	35.26	−3.45
Greens	Martine Delaney	9,293	13.35	+1.17
Arts	Tim Sanderson	1,673	2.40	+2.40
Christian Democrats	George Muskett	1,375	1.98	+1.98
Total formal votes		69,607	96.60	+0.37
Informal votes		2,453	3.40	−0.37
Turnout		72,060	93.85	−1.24
Two-party-preferred result
Labor	Julie Collins	42,264	60.72	+5.63
Liberal	Amanda-Sue Markham	27,343	39.28	−5.63
Labor hold		Swing	+5.63	

==== 2013 ====
2013 Australian federal election: Franklin
Party	Candidate	Votes	%	±%
Labor	Julie Collins	26,893	39.93	−2.92
Liberal	Bernadette Black	26,070	38.71	+5.23
Greens	Rosalie Woodruff	8,201	12.18	−8.69
Palmer United	Marti Zucco	4,108	6.10	+6.10
Family First	Josh Downes	1,264	1.88	+1.88
Katter's Australian	Sarah Ugalde	478	0.71	+0.71
Rise Up Australia	Olwyn Bowden	330	0.49	+0.49
Total formal votes		67,344	96.23	−0.29
Informal votes		2,639	3.77	+0.29
Turnout		69,983	95.09	−0.37
Two-party-preferred result
Labor	Julie Collins	37,103	55.09	−5.73
Liberal	Bernadette Black	30,241	44.91	+5.73
Labor hold		Swing	−5.73	

==== 2010 ====
2010 Australian federal election: Franklin
Party	Candidate	Votes	%	±%
Labor	Julie Collins	28,079	42.85	+2.17
Liberal	Jane Howlett	21,938	33.48	−7.82
Greens	Wendy Heatley	13,675	20.87	+6.15
Independent	John Forster	1,839	2.81	+2.81
Total formal votes		65,531	96.52	−0.83
Informal votes		2,365	3.48	+0.83
Turnout		67,896	95.51	−0.35
Two-party-preferred result
Labor	Julie Collins	39,856	60.82	+6.79
Liberal	Jane Howlett	25,675	39.18	−6.79
Labor hold		Swing	+6.79	

=== Elections in the 2000s ===
==== 2007 ====
2007 Australian federal election: Franklin
Party	Candidate	Votes	%	±%
Labor	Julie Collins	27,990	41.39	−5.03
Liberal	Vanessa Goodwin	27,742	41.02	+2.35
Greens	Gerard Velnaar	9,769	14.44	+3.26
Family First	Gino Papiccio	1,504	2.22	−0.98
Socialist Alliance	Matt Holloway	365	0.53	+0.01
Citizens Electoral Council	Roger Honey	262	0.39	+0.39
Total formal votes		67,632	97.28	+0.68
Informal votes		1,893	2.72	−0.68
Turnout		69,525	95.84	+0.19
Two-party-preferred result
Labor	Julie Collins	36,845	54.48	−3.11
Liberal	Vanessa Goodwin	30,787	45.52	+3.11
Labor hold		Swing	−3.11	

==== 2004 ====
2004 Australian federal election: Franklin
Party	Candidate	Votes	%	±%
Labor	Harry Quick	29,938	46.42	+0.57
Liberal	Henry Finnis	24,936	38.67	+1.11
Greens	Mathew Woolley	7,207	11.18	+1.45
Family First	Marc Mumford	2,063	3.20	+3.20
Socialist Alliance	Glenn Shields	345	0.53	+0.53
Total formal votes		64,489	96.60	−0.40
Informal votes		2,270	3.40	+0.40
Turnout		86,759	95.65	−0.65
Two-party-preferred result
Labor	Harry Quick	37,139	57.59	−0.45
Liberal	Henry Finnis	27,350	42.41	+0.45
Labor hold		Swing	−0.45	

==== 2001 ====
2001 Australian federal election: Franklin
Party	Candidate	Votes	%	±%
Labor	Harry Quick	28,746	45.85	−3.30
Liberal	Peter Hodgman	23,548	37.56	−1.96
Greens	Patricia Bastick	6,098	9.73	+3.27
Democrats	Karen Manskey	3,050	4.86	−0.03
One Nation	Art Mulloy	1,255	2.00	+2.00
Total formal votes		62,697	97.00	−0.21
Informal votes		1,937	3.00	+0.21
Turnout		64,634	97.01	
Two-party-preferred result
Labor	Harry Quick	36,390	58.04	+1.44
Liberal	Peter Hodgman	26,307	41.96	−1.44
Labor hold		Swing	+1.44	

=== Elections in the 1990s ===
==== 1998 ====
1998 Australian federal election: Franklin
Party	Candidate	Votes	%	±%
Labor	Harry Quick	30,180	49.14	+3.19
Liberal	Jane Goodluck	24,266	39.51	−1.25
Greens	Kay McFarlane	3,962	6.45	−0.52
Democrats	Irene Fisher	3,003	4.89	−0.14
Total formal votes		61,411	97.21	−0.53
Informal votes		1,763	2.79	+0.53
Turnout		63,174	96.05	−0.79
Two-party-preferred result
Labor	Harry Quick	34,759	56.60	+1.92
Liberal	Jane Goodluck	26,652	43.40	−1.92
Labor hold		Swing	+1.92	

==== 1996 ====
1996 Australian federal election: Franklin
Party	Candidate	Votes	%	±%
Labor	Harry Quick	28,259	45.95	−3.25
Liberal	Les Glover	25,068	40.76	+2.01
Greens	John Hale	4,286	6.97	−1.24
Democrats	Irene Fisher	3,094	5.03	+1.19
Independent	Kim Peart	788	1.28	+1.28
Total formal votes		61,495	97.74	+0.33
Informal votes		1,420	2.26	−0.33
Turnout		62,915	96.84	+0.24
Two-party-preferred result
Labor	Harry Quick	33,567	54.68	−2.76
Liberal	Les Glover	27,824	45.32	+2.76
Labor hold		Swing	−2.76	

==== 1993 ====
1993 Australian federal election: Franklin
Party	Candidate	Votes	%	±%
Labor	Harry Quick	29,238	49.20	+10.33
Liberal	Graeme Gilbert	23,030	38.75	−9.86
Greens	Louise Crossley	4,878	8.21	+8.21
Democrats	James Richard	2,281	3.84	−8.68
Total formal votes		59,427	97.42	+0.45
Informal votes		1,576	2.58	−0.45
Turnout		61,003	96.60	
Two-party-preferred result
Labor	Harry Quick	34,119	57.43	+9.64
Liberal	Graeme Gilbert	25,288	42.57	−9.64
Labor gain from Liberal		Swing	+9.64	

==== 1990 ====
1990 Australian federal election: Franklin
Party	Candidate	Votes	%	±%
Liberal	Bruce Goodluck	28,636	48.5	−1.7
Labor	Eugene Alexander	22,925	38.8	−1.6
Democrats	Patsy Harmsen	7,523	12.7	+3.3
Total formal votes		59,084	97.0	
Informal votes		1,819	3.0	
Turnout		60,903	96.7	
Two-party-preferred result
Liberal	Bruce Goodluck	30,778	52.1	−1.2
Labor	Eugene Alexander	28,268	47.9	+1.2
Liberal hold		Swing	−1.2	

=== Elections in the 1980s ===
==== 1987 ====
1987 Australian federal election: Franklin
Party	Candidate	Votes	%	±%
Liberal	Bruce Goodluck	27,725	50.2	−3.4
Labor	Nick Sherry	22,292	40.4	−0.2
Democrats	Patsy Harmsen	5,171	9.4	+3.7
Total formal votes		55,188	95.5	
Informal votes		2,619	4.5	
Turnout		57,807	96.3	
Two-party-preferred result
Liberal	Bruce Goodluck	29,407	53.3	−2.3
Labor	Nick Sherry	25,777	46.7	+2.3
Liberal hold		Swing	−2.3	

==== 1984 ====
1984 Australian federal election: Franklin
Party	Candidate	Votes	%	±%
Liberal	Bruce Goodluck	27,315	53.6	−1.0
Labor	John Devereux	20,701	40.6	−1.9
Democrats	John Thomson	2,916	5.7	+3.2
Total formal votes		50,932	94.7	
Informal votes		2,868	5.3	
Turnout		53,800	96.1	
Two-party-preferred result
Liberal	Bruce Goodluck	28,338	55.6	−0.1
Labor	John Devereux	22,592	44.4	+0.1
Liberal hold		Swing	−0.1	

==== 1983 ====
1983 Australian federal election: Franklin
Party	Candidate	Votes	%	±%
Liberal	Bruce Goodluck	28,814	52.4	+1.1
Labor	Fran Bladel	24,578	44.7	−0.7
Democrats	John Thomson	1,357	2.5	−0.8
Socialist Workers	David Mazengarb	278	0.5	+0.5
Total formal votes		55,027	98.1	
Informal votes		1,047	1.9	
Turnout		56,074	96.2	
Two-party-preferred result
Liberal	Bruce Goodluck		53.5	+0.8
Labor	Fran Bladel		46.5	−0.8
Liberal hold		Swing	+0.8	

==== 1980 ====
1980 Australian federal election: Franklin
Party	Candidate	Votes	%	±%
Liberal	Bruce Goodluck	26,893	51.3	−3.4
Labor	Fran Bladel	23,809	45.4	+0.1
Democrats	John Thomson	1,734	3.3	+3.3
Total formal votes		52,436	97.6	
Informal votes		1,264	2.4	
Turnout		53,700	96.9	
Two-party-preferred result
Liberal	Bruce Goodluck		52.7	−2.0
Labor	Fran Bladel		47.3	+2.0
Liberal hold		Swing	−2.0	

=== Elections in the 1970s ===
==== 1977 ====
1977 Australian federal election: Franklin
Party	Candidate	Votes	%	±%
Liberal	Bruce Goodluck	26,797	54.7	+5.3
Labor	Peter Colquhoun	22,175	45.3	−2.4
Total formal votes		48,972	97.6	
Informal votes		1,222	2.4	
Turnout		50,194	97.3	
Liberal hold		Swing	+2.9	

==== 1975 ====
1975 Australian federal election: Franklin
Party	Candidate	Votes	%	±%
Liberal	Bruce Goodluck	23,829	49.4	+12.3
Labor	Ray Sherry	23,011	47.7	−15.2
National Country	Margaret Franklin	966	2.0	+2.0
National Country	Joseph Hand	293	0.6	+0.6
Workers	Peter Mollon	171	0.4	+0.4
Total formal votes		48,270	97.9	
Informal votes		1,033	2.1	
Turnout		49,303	96.9	
Two-party-preferred result
Liberal	Bruce Goodluck	25,010	51.8	+14.7
Labor	Ray Sherry	23,260	48.2	−14.7
Liberal gain from Labor		Swing	+14.7	

==== 1974 ====
1974 Australian federal election: Franklin
Party	Candidate	Votes	%	±%
Labor	Ray Sherry	29,161	62.9	−1.3
Liberal	Leo Jarvis	17,194	37.1	+5.2
Total formal votes		46,355	98.4	
Informal votes		758	1.6	
Turnout		47,113	96.9	
Labor hold		Swing	−2.1	

==== 1972 ====
1972 Australian federal election: Franklin
Party	Candidate	Votes	%	±%
Labor	Ray Sherry	26,512	64.2	+9.6
Liberal	William Craig	13,150	31.9	−7.9
Democratic Labor	Keith Kelly	1,610	3.9	−0.2
Total formal votes		41,272	98.7	
Informal votes		542	1.3	
Turnout		41,814	97.8	
Two-party-preferred result
Labor	Ray Sherry		65.0	+9.1
Liberal	William Craig		35.0	−9.1
Labor hold		Swing	+9.1	

=== Elections in the 1960s ===
==== 1969 ====
1969 Australian federal election: Franklin
Party	Candidate	Votes	%	±%
Labor	Ray Sherry	20,664	54.6	+11.7
Liberal	Thomas Pearsall	15,071	39.8	−10.0
Democratic Labor	Richard Delany	1,563	4.1	−3.2
Independent	Kenneth Newcombe	529	1.4	+1.4
Total formal votes		37,827	98.6	
Informal votes		555	1.4	
Turnout		38,382	97.3	
Two-party-preferred result
Labor	Ray Sherry		55.9	+9.9
Liberal	Thomas Pearsall		44.1	−9.9
Labor gain from Liberal		Swing	+9.9	

==== 1966 ====
1966 Australian federal election: Franklin
Party	Candidate	Votes	%	±%
Liberal	Thomas Pearsall	21,442	48.0	+2.7
Labor	John Parsons	19,986	44.7	−3.2
Democratic Labor	John Lynch	3,249	7.3	+0.5
Total formal votes		44,677	98.3	
Informal votes		782	1.7	
Turnout		45,459	96.5	
Two-party-preferred result
Liberal	Thomas Pearsall	23,309	52.2	+1.3
Labor	John Parsons	21,368	47.8	−1.3
Liberal hold		Swing	+1.3	

==== 1963 ====
1963 Australian federal election: Franklin
Party	Candidate	Votes	%	±%
Labor	John Parsons	19,362	47.9	+4.9
Liberal	Bill Falkinder	18,322	45.3	−0.6
Democratic Labor	Andrew Defendini	2,732	6.8	−4.3
Total formal votes		40,416	98.8	
Informal votes		509	1.2	
Turnout		40,925	96.6	
Two-party-preferred result
Liberal	Bill Falkinder	20,582	50.9	−3.8
Labor	John Parsons	19,834	49.1	+3.8
Liberal hold		Swing	−3.8	

==== 1961 ====
1961 Australian federal election: Franklin
Party	Candidate	Votes	%	±%
Liberal	Bill Falkinder	16,784	45.9	−8.2
Labor	William Wilkinson	15,709	43.0	+6.3
Democratic Labor	St Clair Courtney	4,047	11.1	+1.9
Total formal votes		36,540	96.2	
Informal votes		1,427	3.8	
Turnout		37,967	96.2	
Two-party-preferred result
Liberal	Bill Falkinder	19,991	54.7	−6.8
Labor	William Wilkinson	16,549	45.3	+6.8
Liberal hold		Swing	−6.8	

=== Elections in the 1950s ===
==== 1958 ====
1958 Australian federal election: Franklin
Party	Candidate	Votes	%	±%
Liberal	Bill Falkinder	17,484	54.1	+0.5
Labor	Lynda Heaven	11,846	36.7	−3.6
Democratic Labor	Henry Scoles	2,973	9.2	+3.1
Total formal votes		32,303	95.5	
Informal votes		1,522	4.5	
Turnout		33,825	96.3	
Two-party-preferred result
Liberal	Bill Falkinder		61.5	+3.0
Labor	Lynda Heaven		38.5	−3.0
Liberal hold		Swing	+3.0	

==== 1955 ====
1955 Australian federal election: Franklin
Party	Candidate	Votes	%	±%
Liberal	Bill Falkinder	15,471	53.6	−0.6
Labor	Brian Crawford	11,652	40.3	−5.4
Labor (A-C)	Henry Roberts	1,757	6.1	+6.1
Total formal votes		28,880	95.3	
Informal votes		1,424	4.7	
Turnout		30,304	97.1	
Two-party-preferred result
Liberal	Bill Falkinder		58.5	+4.3
Labor	Brian Crawford		41.5	−4.3
Liberal hold		Swing	+4.3	

==== 1954 ====
1954 Australian federal election: Franklin
Party	Candidate	Votes	%	±%
Liberal	Bill Falkinder	20,447	54.0	−1.4
Labor	Jack Frost	17,396	46.0	+1.4
Total formal votes		37,843	99.2	
Informal votes		306	0.8	
Turnout		38,149	95.7	
Liberal hold		Swing	−1.4	

==== 1951 ====
1951 Australian federal election: Franklin
Party	Candidate	Votes	%	±%
Liberal	Bill Falkinder	17,983	55.4	−2.6
Labor	Jack Frost	14,460	44.6	+2.6
Total formal votes		32,443	97.8	
Informal votes		934	2.8	
Turnout		33,377	97.0	
Liberal hold		Swing	−2.6	

=== Elections in the 1940s ===
==== 1949 ====
1949 Australian federal election: Franklin
Party	Candidate	Votes	%	±%
Liberal	Bill Falkinder	17,644	58.0	+6.9
Labor	Jack Frost	12,790	42.0	−6.9
Total formal votes		30,434	97.4	
Informal votes		822	2.6	
Turnout		31,256	96.7	
Liberal hold		Swing	+6.9	

==== 1946 ====
1946 Australian federal election: Franklin
Party	Candidate	Votes	%	±%
Liberal	Bill Falkinder	15,678	50.1	+9.0
Labor	Charles Frost	15,605	49.9	−9.0
Total formal votes		31,283	97.3	
Informal votes		876	2.7	
Turnout		32,159	94.6	
Liberal gain from Labor		Swing	+10.0	

==== 1943 ====
1943 Australian federal election: Franklin
Party	Candidate	Votes	%	±%
Labor	Charles Frost	17,195	58.9	+5.4
United Australia	Denis Warner	9,101	31.2	−5.4
United Australia	Charles Tennant	2,903	9.9	+9.9
Total formal votes		29,199	97.7	
Informal votes		831	2.8	
Turnout		30,030	96.2	
Two-party-preferred result
Labor	Charles Frost		59.9	+6.4
United Australia	Denis Warner		40.1	−6.4
Labor hold		Swing	+6.4	

==== 1940 ====
1940 Australian federal election: Franklin
Party	Candidate	Votes	%	±%
Labor	Charles Frost	14,322	53.5	−4.5
United Australia	Hugh Warner	12,466	46.5	+4.5
Total formal votes		26,788	96.7	
Informal votes		913	3.3	
Turnout		27,701	96.0	
Labor hold		Swing	−4.5	

=== Elections in the 1930s ===
==== 1937 ====
1937 Australian federal election: Franklin
Party	Candidate	Votes	%	±%
Labor	Charles Frost	15,348	58.0	+14.9
United Australia	Hugh Warner	11,133	42.0	+2.2
Total formal votes		26,481	97.8	
Informal votes		599	2.2	
Turnout		27,080	97.0	
Labor hold		Swing	+5.6	

==== 1934 ====
1934 Australian federal election: Franklin
Party	Candidate	Votes	%	±%
Labor	Charles Frost	10,850	43.1	+11.3
United Australia	Archibald Blacklow	10,015	39.8	−16.2
Social Credit	John Modridge	2,221	8.8	+8.8
Country	George Frankcombe	2,086	8.3	+8.3
Total formal votes		25,172	96.2	
Informal votes		981	3.8	
Turnout		26,153	96.5	
Two-party-preferred result
Labor	Charles Frost	13,182	52.4	+15.4
United Australia	Archibald Blacklow	11,990	47.6	−15.4
Labor gain from United Australia		Swing	+15.4	

==== 1931 ====
1931 Australian federal election: Franklin
Party	Candidate	Votes	%	±%
United Australia	Archibald Blacklow	12,819	56.0	+10.9
Labor	Charles Frost	7,274	31.8	+31.8
Independent	Albert Beard	2,778	12.1	+12.1
Total formal votes		22,871	95.0	
Informal votes		1,195	5.0	
Turnout		24,066	96.4	
United Australia gain from Independent		Swing	+17.9	

Sitting member William McWilliams (Independent) died in 1929 and Charles Frost (Labor) won the resulting by-election.

=== Elections in the 1920s ===
==== 1929 by-election ====
1929 Franklin by-election
Party	Candidate	Votes	%	±%
Labor	Charles Frost	9,615	44.5	+44.5
Nationalist	Archibald Blacklow	5,003	23.2	−0.2
Nationalist	Alfred Seabrook	4,675	21.7	+21.7
Independent	Peter Murdoch	1,476	6.8	+6.8
Ind. Nationalist	Francis O. Foster	820	3.8	+3.8
Total formal votes		21,589	95.9	
Informal votes		931	4.1	
Turnout		22,520	92.0	
Two-party-preferred result
Labor	Charles Frost	11,204	51.9	+51.9
Nationalist	Archibald Blacklow	10,385	48.1	+3.0
Labor gain from Independent		Swing	−3.0	

William McWilliams (Independent) died.

==== 1929 ====
1929 Australian federal election: Franklin
Party	Candidate	Votes	%	±%
Independent	William McWilliams	12,399	54.9	+10.4
Nationalist	Alfred Seabrook	10,175	45.1	−10.4
Total formal votes		22,574	98.5	
Informal votes		343	1.5	
Turnout		22,917	95.3	
Independent hold		Swing	+3.3	

==== 1928 ====
1928 Australian federal election: Franklin
Party	Candidate	Votes	%	±%
Nationalist	Alfred Seabrook	9,173	44.8	−6.3
Independent	William McWilliams	9,121	44.5	+44.5
Nationalist	Francis O. Foster	2,195	10.7	+10.7
Total formal votes		20,489	93.7	
Informal votes		1,380	6.3	
Turnout		21,869	91.7	
Two-party-preferred result
Independent	William McWilliams	10,567	51.6	+51.6
Nationalist	Alfred Seabrook	9,922	48.4	−7.2
Independent gain from Nationalist		Swing	+7.2	

==== 1925 ====
1925 Australian federal election: Franklin
Party	Candidate	Votes	%	±%
Nationalist	Alfred Seabrook	6,107	31.5	+30.2
Nationalist	William McWilliams	5,879	30.3	+30.3
Labor	Eric Ogilvie	5,836	30.1	−5.5
Labor	Douglas Thompson	1,574	8.1	+8.1
Total formal votes		19,396	93.6	
Informal votes		1,325	6.4	
Turnout		20,721	86.5	
Two-party-preferred result
Nationalist	Alfred Seabrook	10,787	55.6	−0.7
Labor	Eric Ogilvie	8,609	44.4	+0.7
Nationalist hold		Swing	−0.7	

==== 1922 ====
1922 Australian federal election: Franklin
Party	Candidate	Votes	%	±%
Labor	Benjamin Watkins	3,364	37.6	+37.6
Nationalist	Alfred Seabrook	2,829	31.6	+31.6
Country	William McWilliams	2,762	30.8	+30.8
Total formal votes		8,955	95.8	
Informal votes		396	4.2	
Turnout		9,351	43.8	
Two-party-preferred result
Nationalist	Alfred Seabrook	5,040	56.3	−5.8
Labor	Benjamin Watkins	3,915	43.7	+43.7
Nationalist hold		Swing	−5.8	

=== Elections in the 1910s ===
==== 1919 ====
1919 Australian federal election: Franklin
Party	Candidate	Votes	%	±%
Nationalist	William McWilliams	7,291	62.1	−37.9
Nationalist	Louis Shoobridge	4,451	37.9	+37.9
Total formal votes		11,742	93.1	
Informal votes		866	6.9	
Turnout		12,608	53.1	
Nationalist hold		Swing	−37.9	

==== 1917 ====
1917 Australian federal election: Franklin
Party	Candidate	Votes	%	±%
Nationalist	William McWilliams	unopposed		
Nationalist hold		Swing		

==== 1914 ====
1914 Australian federal election: Franklin
Party	Candidate	Votes	%	±%
Liberal	William McWilliams	unopposed		
Liberal hold		Swing		

==== 1913 ====
1913 Australian federal election: Franklin
Party	Candidate	Votes	%	±%
Liberal	William McWilliams	9,202	55.8	+2.4
Labor	William Shoobridge	7,299	44.2	−2.4
Total formal votes		16,501	96.8	
Informal votes		551	3.2	
Turnout		17,052	76.4	
Liberal hold		Swing	+2.4	

==== 1910 ====
1910 Australian federal election: Franklin
Party	Candidate	Votes	%	±%
Liberal	William McWilliams	6,356	53.4	−46.6
Labour	William Shoobridge	5,554	46.6	+46.6
Total formal votes		11,910	97.1	
Informal votes		354	2.9	
Turnout		12,264	61.6	
Liberal hold		Swing	−46.6	

=== Elections in the 1900s ===
==== 1906 ====
1906 Australian federal election: Franklin
Party	Candidate	Votes	%	±%
Anti-Socialist	William McWilliams	unopposed		
Member changed to Anti-Socialist from Revenue Tariff		Swing	−6.5	

==== 1903 ====
1903 Australian federal election: Franklin
Party	Candidate	Votes	%	±%
Revenue Tariff	William McWilliams	1,986	37.1	+37.1
Free Trade	Russell Macnaghten	1,485	27.8	+27.8
Revenue Tariff	William Clifford	785	14.7	+14.7
Revenue Tariff	Henry Tinning	775	14.5	+14.5
Independent	Wentworth Hardy	320	6.0	+6.0
Total formal votes		5,351	97.1	
Informal votes		162	2.9	
Turnout		5,513	33.9	
Revenue Tariff win		(new seat)		
