= Results of the 1987 Australian federal election in Tasmania =

1987 Australian federal election (Tasmania)
| ← 1984 | 11 July 1987 | 1990 → |

All 5 Tasmania seats in the Australian House of Representatives and all 12 seats in the Australian Senate
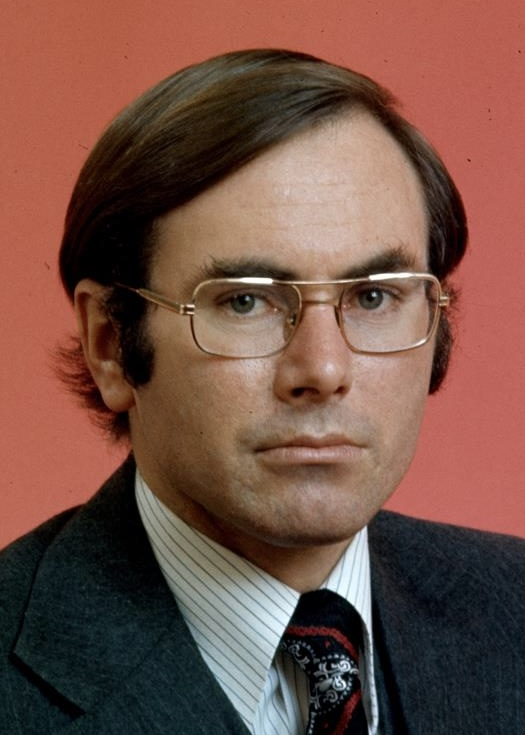

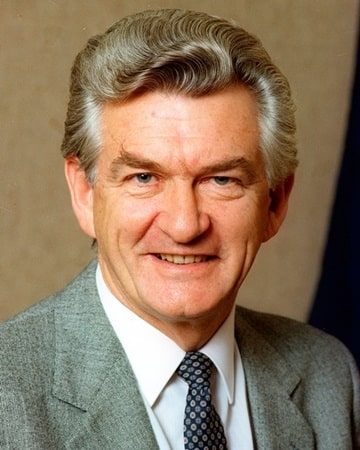
| | First party | Second party |
|---|---|---|
| Leader | John Howard | Bob Hawke |
| Party | Liberal/National coalition | Labor |
| Last election | 5 seats | 0 seats |
| Seats won | 4 seats | 1 seat |
| Seat change | ▼1 | ▲1 |
| Popular vote | 140,217 | 118,077 |
| Percentage | 51.1% | 43.0% |
| Swing | ▼0.1 | ▼0.4 |
| TPP | 53.1% | 47.69% |
| TPP swing | ▼0.27 | ▲0.27 |

This is a list of electoral division results for the Australian 1987 federal election in the state of Tasmania.

== Overall results ==
Turnout 96.1% (CV) — Informal 4.8%
| Party | Votes | % | Swing | Seats | Change |
|---|---|---|---|---|---|
| Liberal | 140,217 | 51.05 | -0.08 | 4 | ▼1 |
| Labor | 118,077 | 42.99 | -0.43 | 1 | ▲1 |
| Democrats | 16,371 | 5.96 | 1.95 | | |
| Total | 274,665 | | | 5 | |
Two-party-preferred vote
| Liberal | 145,830 | 53.10 | -0.27 | 4 | ▼1 |
| Labor | 128,819 | 46.90 | 0.27 | 1 | ▲1 |
| Invalid/blank votes | 14,297 | 4.95 | -0.92 | | |
| Turnout | 288,962 | 96.08 | | | |
| Registered voters | 300,763 | | | | |
Source: Psephos Adam Carr's Election Archive 1987

== Results by division ==
=== Bass ===
1987 Australian federal election: Bass
| Party | Candidate | Votes | % | ±% |
|---|---|---|---|---|
| Liberal | Warwick Smith | 28,149 | 51.8 | −0.2 |
| Labor | Richard Taylor | 23,311 | 42.9 | −0.1 |
| Democrats | Michael Preece | 2,910 | 5.4 | +0.4 |
| Total formal votes | | 54,370 | 94.3 | |
| Informal votes | | 3,281 | 5.7 | |
| Turnout | | 57,651 | 96.0 | |
Two-party-preferred result
| Liberal | Warwick Smith | 29,173 | 53.7 | −0.7 |
| Labor | Richard Taylor | 25,194 | 46.3 | +0.7 |
| Liberal hold | | Swing | −0.7 | |

=== Braddon ===
1987 Australian federal election: Braddon
| Party | Candidate | Votes | % | ±% |
|---|---|---|---|---|
| Liberal | Chris Miles | 32,108 | 57.9 | +5.2 |
| Labor | David Currie | 23,307 | 42.1 | −1.3 |
| Total formal votes | | 55,415 | 96.2 | |
| Informal votes | | 2,173 | 3.8 | |
| Turnout | | 57,588 | 96.3 | |
| Liberal hold | | Swing | +3.3 | |

=== Denison ===
1987 Australian federal election: Denison
| Party | Candidate | Votes | % | ±% |
|---|---|---|---|---|
| Labor | Duncan Kerr | 26,732 | 48.3 | +3.4 |
| Liberal | Michael Hodgman | 24,590 | 44.4 | −3.7 |
| Democrats | Robert Bell | 4,054 | 7.3 | +7.3 |
| Total formal votes | | 55,376 | 95.6 | |
| Informal votes | | 2,540 | 4.4 | |
| Turnout | | 57,916 | 95.2 | |
Two-party-preferred result
| Labor | Duncan Kerr | 29,787 | 53.8 | +4.8 |
| Liberal | Michael Hodgman | 25,587 | 46.2 | −4.8 |
| Labor gain from Liberal | | Swing | +4.8 | |

=== Franklin ===
1987 Australian federal election: Franklin
| Party | Candidate | Votes | % | ±% |
|---|---|---|---|---|
| Liberal | Bruce Goodluck | 27,725 | 50.2 | −3.4 |
| Labor | Nick Sherry | 22,292 | 40.4 | −0.2 |
| Democrats | Patsy Harmsen | 5,171 | 9.4 | +3.7 |
| Total formal votes | | 55,188 | 95.5 | |
| Informal votes | | 2,619 | 4.5 | |
| Turnout | | 57,807 | 96.3 | |
Two-party-preferred result
| Liberal | Bruce Goodluck | 29,407 | 53.3 | −2.3 |
| Labor | Nick Sherry | 25,777 | 46.7 | +2.3 |
| Liberal hold | | Swing | −2.3 | |

=== Lyons ===
1987 Australian federal election:Lyons
| Party | Candidate | Votes | % | ±% |
|---|---|---|---|---|
| Liberal | Max Burr | 27,645 | 50.9 | +1.4 |
| Labor | Dick Adams | 22,435 | 41.3 | −3.7 |
| Democrats | Liz Holloway | 4,236 | 7.8 | +2.3 |
| Total formal votes | | 54,316 | 93.6 | |
| Informal votes | | 3,684 | 6.4 | |
| Turnout | | 58,000 | 96.6 | |
Two-party-preferred result
| Liberal | Max Burr | 29,555 | 54.4 | +3.1 |
| Labor | Dick Adams | 24,754 | 45.6 | −3.1 |
| Liberal hold | | Swing | +3.1 | |

== See also ==
- Results of the 1987 Australian federal election (House of Representatives)
- Members of the Australian House of Representatives, 1987–1990
