= Australia–Sri Lanka relations =

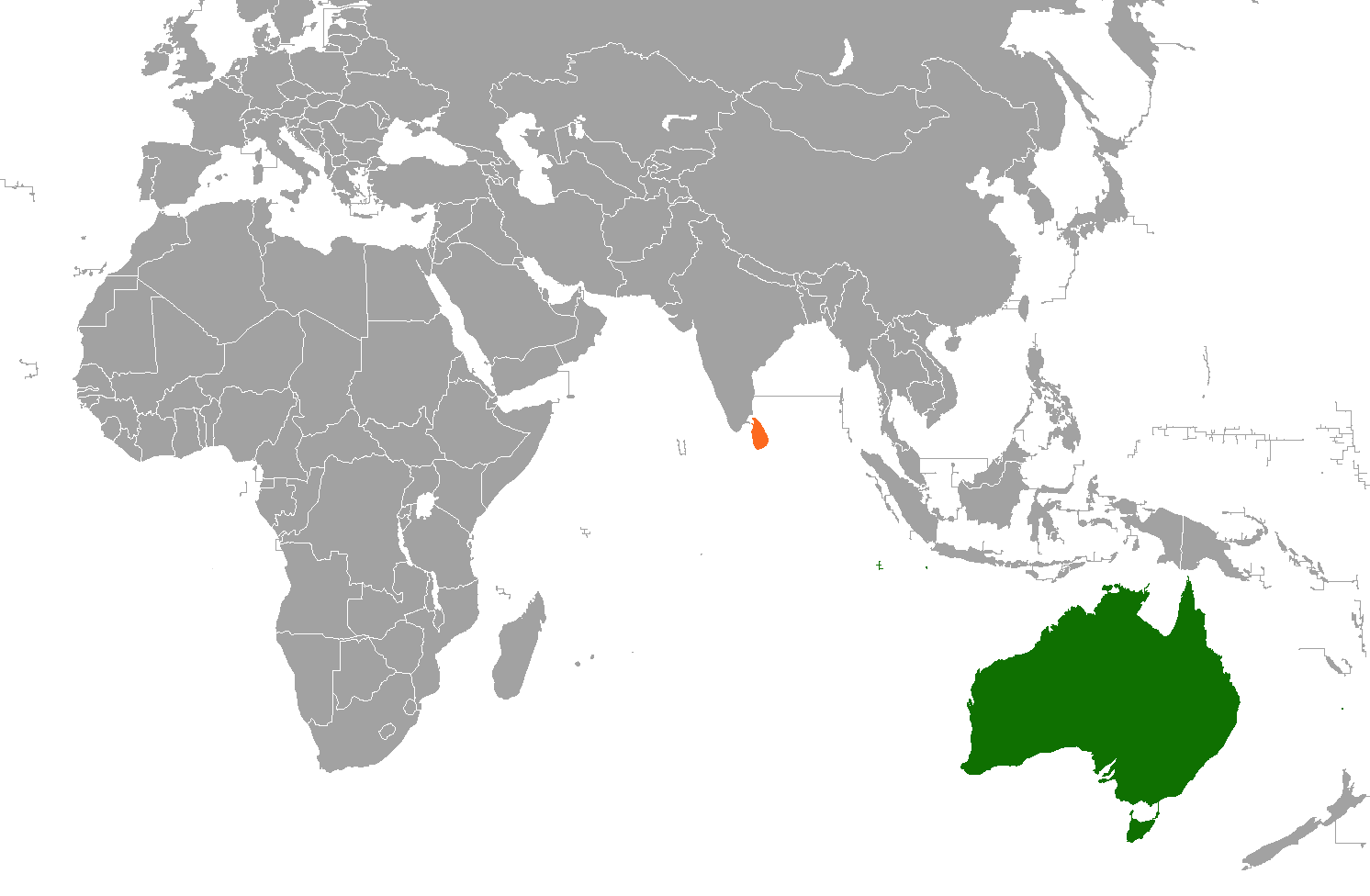

- Australia: Sri Lanka

Foreign relations exist between Australia and Sri Lanka. Both Australia and Sri Lanka are members of the Commonwealth of Nations. Australia has served as a haven for Sri Lankan migrants, with the 2022 national census reporting that at least 145,430 individuals born in Sri Lanka had migrated to Australia.

== History ==
=== Pre-19th century ===
Relations between both nations of Australia and Sri Lanka may have existed before colonialism. The Tamil Bell, discovered in 1836 by missionary William Colenso in New Zealand led to a speculation about a possible Tamil presence in New Zealand and possibly Australia as said by Indologist V. R. Ramachandra Dikshitar in his book called The Origin and Spread of the Tamils which states that the Tamil seafarers might have a knowledge of Australia and Polynesia. It is believed that the Tamils could have reached Australia in the 14th century coming from the areas of present-day India and Sri Lanka.

=== 19th and early 20th centuries ===
Both Australia and Sri Lanka were colonies of the British Empire. During the 19th and early 20th centuries, many people from Ceylon migrated to Australia which was mainly for labour purposes.

Monthly value of Australian merchandise exports to Sri Lanka (A$ millions) since 1988

Monthly value of Sri Lankan merchandise exports to Australia (A$ millions) since 1988

=== 1948–present ===
After gaining independence from the United Kingdom, Ceylon opened a High Commission in Canberra in 1949. In 1951 Ceylon's Prime Minister D.S. Senanayake was the first high-profile diplomatic visitor to Australia, which was followed by Prime Minister Sir John Kotelawala in 1954. President Junius Richard Jayewardene visited Australia in 1978. In 2011 President Mahinda Rajapaksa participated in the CHOGM summit in Perth, Australia. In 2017 Prime Minister Ranil Wickremesinghe and President Maithripala Sirisena made state visits to Australia. Prime Ministers Sir Robert Menzies, Gough Whitlam and Tony Abbott have visited Sri Lanka. In November 2017 PM Malcolm Turnbull visited to Sri Lanka.

The Australian Government has expressed concern over the conflict between the Sri Lankan Government and the Tamil Tigers. In October 2008, Australian Foreign Minister Stephen Smith told his Sri Lankan counterpart that military action alone will not solve the dispute with the Tamil separatists. In May 2009, Australian Foreign Minister Stephen Smith said that Sri Lanka should seek a political solution with the Tamils to stop another generation turning to terrorism.

During Prime Minister Tony Abbott's visit to Sri Lanka for the Commonwealth Heads of Government Meeting 2013 meeting, he announced Australia would be donating two navy patrol boats to the Sri Lankan Navy to promote enhanced collaboration on people smuggling.

2017 marked the 70 Years of relationships between Australia and Sri Lanka, Prime Minister Ranil Wickramasinghe paid a state visit to Australia to mark the event.

== Diplomatic missions ==
Australia has a High Commission in Colombo. Sri Lanka has a High Commission in Canberra and Consulate-General in Melbourne which was opened in 2013.

== Sporting relations ==
Sri Lanka and Australia have established a strong sporting relationship, particularly in cricket, which is the most prominent sport linking the two nations. Both countries however, have met in other sports like netball and rugby where these sports are also popular in the respective countries.

The Sri Lanka national cricket team and the Australia national cricket team have played 152 matches against each other in 3 different formats. The first encounter between Australia and Sri Lanka took place on June 11, 1975, during the group stage of the 1975 Cricket World Cup. Australia won this match by 52 runs and progressed to the finals, where they were defeated by the West Indies. On the other hand, Sri Lanka was eliminated in the group stage, having lost all three of their matches. Since then, the teams have been fierce rivals culminating in them facing off in the 1996 Cricket World Cup final where Sri Lanka won in a huge underdog victory. The teams later faced each other again in the Cricket World Cup final, this time during the 2007 edition, in which Australia emerged victorious. While relations between both teams have usually friendly, with players of both teams playing in each other's domestic leagues there have been some notable outliers of sour incidents. The 1995 Muralitharan MCG incident refers to a controversial event that occurred during a Test match between Australia and Sri Lanka at the Melbourne Cricket Ground (MCG) in December 1995. During the match, Sri Lankan spinner Muttiah Muralitharan, known for his unique bowling action, was no-balled multiple times by Australian umpire Darrell Hair for throwing, rather than bowling. This decision sparked significant debate regarding the legality of Muralitharan's bowling style, which involved an unusual wrist and arm motion. The incident led to protests from the Sri Lankan team and ignited discussions about the rules governing bowling actions in cricket. It also highlighted issues of bias and fairness in officiating, particularly against bowlers with unconventional styles. Despite eventually playing in Australia for 2 seasons with the Melbourne Renegades in the T20I Big Bash League, Muralitharan faced a lot of racism in Australia and even claimed criticism from then Prime Minister of Australia, John Howard, the latter's comments on whether Muralitharan was "chucking" the ball was a huge reason on why the Sri Lanka Cricket voted against Howard's bid for ICC Presidency. In 2022, amidst the political and economic meltdown in Sri Lanka, many people came to support and thank the Australian national cricket team for touring the island nation and the crowd was praised by the likes of Glenn Maxwell.

== High Commissioners ==
Australian High Commissioners to Sri Lanka

#	Officeholder	Title	Other offices	Term start date	Term end date	Time in office	Notes
1	Charles Frost	Commissioner of Australia to the Colony of Ceylon		16 January 1947	4 February 1948	3 years, 262 days	
1	Charles Frost	High Commissioner of Australia to the Dominion of Ceylon		4 February 1948	5 October 1950	3 years, 262 days	
2	Dr John Burton	High Commissioner of Australia to the Dominion of Ceylon		19 January 1951	28 March 1951	68 days	
−	Alex Borthwick	Chargé d'affaires		28 March 1951	29 February 1952	338 days	
3	Roden Cutler VC	High Commissioner of Australia to the Dominion of Ceylon		29 February 1952	14 June 1955	3 years, 106 days	
4	Allan Eastman	High Commissioner of Australia to the Dominion of Ceylon		1956	1958	1–2 years	
5	Charles Kevin	High Commissioner of Australia to the Dominion of Ceylon		1959	1961	1–2 years	
6	Bertram Ballard	High Commissioner of Australia to the Dominion of Ceylon		16 July 1962	7 December 1965	3 years, 144 days	
7	Gordon Upton	High Commissioner of Australia to the Dominion of Ceylon		7 December 1965	22 January 1970	4 years, 46 days	
8	H. D. White	High Commissioner of Australia to the Dominion of Ceylon		22 January 1970	30 April 1972	2 years, 99 days	
9	H. G. Marshall	High Commissioner of Australia to the Dominion of Ceylon		30 April 1972	22 May 1972	3 years, 79 days	
9	H. G. Marshall	High Commissioner of Australia to Sri Lanka	^{A}	22 May 1972	18 July 1975	3 years, 79 days	
10	Alex Borthwick	High Commissioner of Australia to Sri Lanka	^{A}	18 July 1975	31 October 1979	4 years, 105 days	
11	Warwick Mayne-Wilson	High Commissioner of Australia to Sri Lanka	^{A}	31 October 1979	12 February 1982	2 years, 104 days	
12	David Rutter	High Commissioner of Australia to Sri Lanka	^{AB}	12 February 1982	15 March 1985	3 years, 31 days	
13	Robert Cotton	High Commissioner of Australia to Sri Lanka	^{B}	15 March 1985	February 1988	2 years, 10 months	
14	Tonia Shand AM	High Commissioner of Australia to Sri Lanka	^{B}	February 1988	December 1991	3 years, 10 months	
15	Howard Debenham	High Commissioner of Australia to Sri Lanka	^{B}	1 January 1992	March 1995	3 years, 2 months	
16	Bill Tweddell	High Commissioner of Australia to Sri Lanka	^{B}	March 1995	July 1996	1 year, 4 months	
17	David Ritchie AO	High Commissioner of Australia to Sri Lanka	^{B}	July 1996	January 1999	2 years, 6 months	
18	Peter Rowe	High Commissioner of Australia to Sri Lanka	^{B}	January 1999	January 2002	3 years	
19	David Binns	High Commissioner of Australia to Sri Lanka	^{B}	January 2002	January 2005	3 years	
20	Dr Greg French	High Commissioner of Australia to Sri Lanka	^{B}	January 2005	February 2008	3 years, 1 month	
21	Kathy Klugman	High Commissioner of Australia to Sri Lanka	^{B}	February 2008	7 January 2012	3 years, 11 months	
22	Robyn Mudie	High Commissioner of Australia to Sri Lanka	^{B}	7 January 2012	2016	3–4 years	
23	Bryce Hutchesson	High Commissioner of Australia to Sri Lanka	^{AB}	February 2016	29 January 2019	2 years, 11 months	
24	David Holly	High Commissioner of Australia to Sri Lanka	^{AB}	29 January 2019	6 July 2022	3 years, 158 days	
25	Paul Stephens	High Commissioner of Australia to Sri Lanka	^{B}	6 July 2022	incumbent	3 years, 182 days	

== Trade ==
In 2007 a two-way trade agreement was created between Australia and Sri Lanka valued at $232 million a year. The trade agreement includes exports from Australia such as vegetables and dairy products. Tea and other foods, textiles, clothing, rubber, iron and steel which are the main imports from Sri Lanka.

== Defence ==
In 2014, Australia transferred two Bay-class patrol boats to Sri Lanka Navy Former Royal Australian Air Force Beechcraft KA350 King Air aircraft (registration A32-673) joined Sri Lanka Air Force in 2023 May. Sri Lanka is also engaging in joint activities with the Australian military in the Indo-Pacific Endeavour (IPE) activities

== Aid ==
In 2008-09 the estimated budget for aid to Sri Lanka is $27 million. In April 2009, the Australian Government announced a further A$4.5 million of humanitarian aid to assist the end of the civil war in Sri Lanka. $1.5 million will be given to United Nations High Commissioner for Refugees and the International Organization for Migration.

The Government of Australia has announced a total of AUD $3.5 million in assistance for Sri Lanka in response to the impacts of Cyclone Ditwah.

== See also ==
- Sri Lankan Australian
- Foreign relations of Australia
- Foreign relations of Sri Lanka
- List of high commissioners of Australia to Sri Lanka
