= Results of the 1984 Australian federal election in Tasmania =

1984 Australian federal election (Tasmania)
← 1983	1 December 1984	1987 →

All 5 Tasmanian seats in the Australian House of Representatives and 7 seats in the Australian Senate
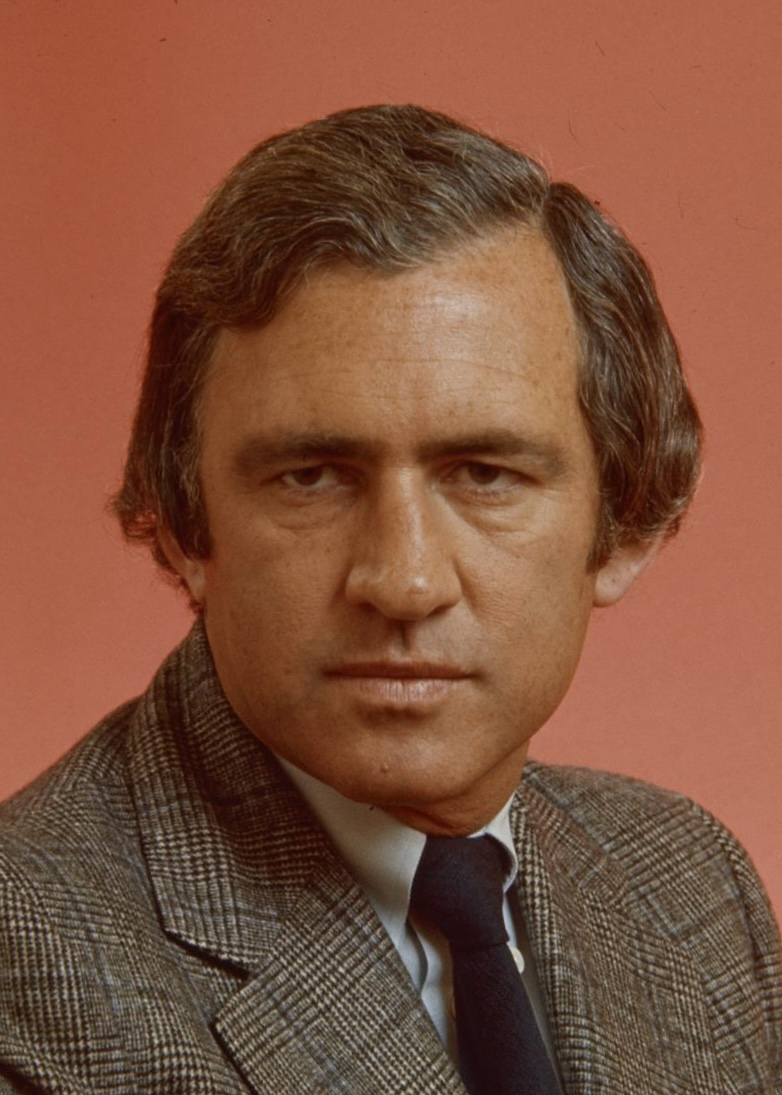

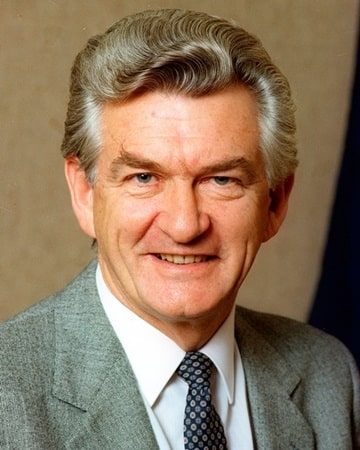
	First party	Second party
Leader	Andrew Peacock	Bob Hawke
Party	Liberal/National coalition	Labor
Last election	5 seats	0 seats
Seats won	5 seats	0 seats
Seat change	Steady	Steady
Popular vote	133,173	113,094
Percentage	51.1%	43.4%
Swing	▼3.8	▲3.1
TPP	53.4%	46.6%
TPP swing	▼3.1	▲3.1

This is a list of electoral division results for the Australian 1984 federal election in the state of Tasmania.

== Overall results ==
Turnout 95.1% (CV) — Informal 8.2%
Party	Votes	%	Swing	Seats	Change
Liberal	133,173	51.13	-3.78	5	Steady
Labor	113,094	43.42	3.14		Steady
Democrats	10,432	4.01	0.44		
Independent	3,747	1.44	0.46		
Total	260,446			5	
Two-party-preferred vote
Liberal	138,983	53.37	-3.05	5	Steady
Labor	121,438	46.63	3.05	0	Steady
Invalid/blank votes	16,237	5.87	3.57		
Turnout	276,683	95.40			
Registered voters	290,028				
Source: Federal Election Results 1949-1993

== Results by division ==
=== Bass ===
1984 Australian federal election: Bass
Party	Candidate	Votes	%	±%
Liberal	Warwick Smith	27,226	52.0	−1.3
Labor	Vicki Buchanan	22,544	43.0	+6.0
Democrats	Michael Preece	2,624	5.0	−1.2
Total formal votes		52,394	93.3	
Informal votes		3,745	6.7	
Turnout		56,139	95.7	
Two-party-preferred result
Liberal	Warwick Smith	28,514	54.4	−3.7
Labor	Vicki Buchanan	23,878	45.6	+3.7
Liberal hold		Swing	−3.7	

=== Braddon ===
1984 Australian federal election: Braddon
Party	Candidate	Votes	%	±%
Liberal	Chris Miles	27,296	52.7	−8.0
Labor	Greg Peart	22,500	43.4	+7.5
Democrats	Gavin Bugg	2,047	3.9	+0.5
Total formal votes		51,843	94.1	
Informal votes		3,248	5.9	
Turnout		55,091	95.4	
Two-party-preferred result
Liberal	Chris Miles	28,297	54.6	−7.5
Labor	Greg Peart	23,541	45.4	+7.5
Liberal hold		Swing	−7.5	

=== Denison ===
1984 Australian federal election: Denison
Party	Candidate	Votes	%	±%
Liberal	Michael Hodgman	25,929	48.1	−4.4
Labor	Kay Spurr	24,230	44.9	+1.5
Independent	Mary Willey	3,747	7.0	+7.0
Total formal votes		53,906	94.1	
Informal votes		3,400	5.9	
Turnout		57,306	95.1	
Two-party-preferred result
Liberal	Michael Hodgman	27,466	51.0	−2.9
Labor	Kay Spurr	26,437	49.0	+2.9
Liberal hold		Swing	−2.9	

=== Franklin ===
1984 Australian federal election: Franklin
Party	Candidate	Votes	%	±%
Liberal	Bruce Goodluck	27,315	53.6	−1.0
Labor	John Devereux	20,701	40.6	−1.9
Democrats	John Thomson	2,916	5.7	+3.2
Total formal votes		50,932	94.7	
Informal votes		2,868	5.3	
Turnout		53,800	96.1	
Two-party-preferred result
Liberal	Bruce Goodluck	28,338	55.6	−0.1
Labor	John Devereux	22,592	44.4	+0.1
Liberal hold		Swing	−0.1	

=== Lyons ===
1984 Australian federal election: Lyons
Party	Candidate	Votes	%	±%
Liberal	Max Burr	25,407	49.5	−4.3
Labor	David Llewellyn	23,119	45.0	+2.7
Democrats	Liz Holloway	2,845	5.5	+3.0
Total formal votes		51,371	93.4	
Informal votes		3,603	6.6	
Turnout		54,974	95.8	
Two-party-preferred result
Liberal	Max Burr	26,368	51.3	−3.7
Labor	David Llewellyn	24,990	48.7	+3.7
Liberal notional hold		Swing	−3.7	

== See also ==
- Results of the 1984 Australian federal election (House of Representatives)
- Members of the Australian House of Representatives, 1984–1987
