= 1929 Franklin by-election =

- 14 December 1929
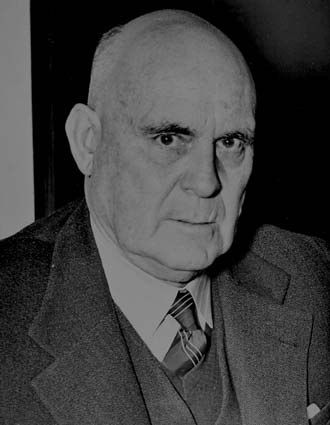

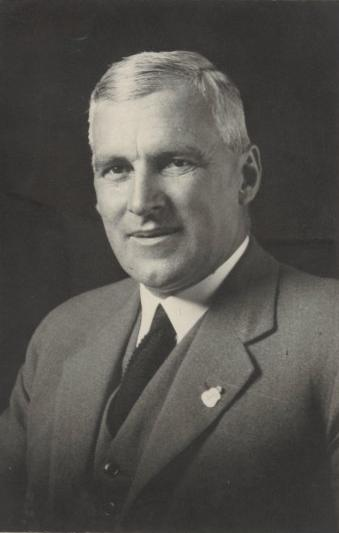

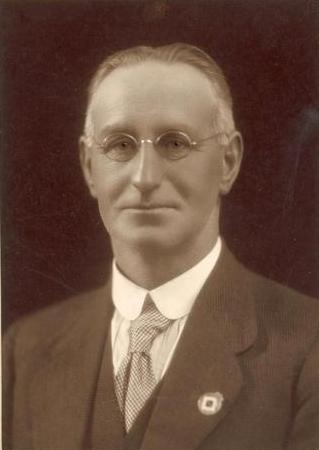
	First party	Second party	Third party
Candidate	Charles Frost	Archibald Blacklow	Alfred Seabrook
Party	Labor	Nationalist	Nationalist
First preference vote	9,615	5,003	4,675
Percentage	44.5%	23.2%	21.7%
Swing	▲44.5pp	▼0.2pp	▲21.7pp
TPP	51.9%	48.1%
TPP swing	▲51.9pp	▲3.0pp
MP before election
William McWilliams
Independent
Elected MP
Charles Frost
Labor

A by-election was held for the Australian House of Representatives seat of Franklin on 14 December 1929. This was triggered by the death of independent MP William McWilliams.

The by-election was won by Labor candidate Charles Frost.

== Results ==
1929 Franklin by-election
Party	Candidate	Votes	%	±%
Labor	Charles Frost	9,615	44.5	+44.5
Nationalist	Archibald Blacklow	5,003	23.2	−0.2
Nationalist	Alfred Seabrook	4,675	21.7	+21.7
Independent	Peter Murdoch	1,476	6.8	+6.8
Ind. Nationalist	Francis O. Foster	820	3.8	+3.8
Total formal votes		21,589	95.9	
Informal votes		931	4.1	
Turnout		22,520	92.0	
Two-party-preferred result
Labor	Charles Frost	11,204	51.9	+51.9
Nationalist	Archibald Blacklow	10,385	48.1	+3.0
Labor gain from Independent		Swing	−3.0	
