= Results of the 1993 Australian federal election in Tasmania =

1993 Australian federal election (Tasmania)
- 13 March 1993

All 5 Tasmanian seats in the Australian House of Representatives and 6 seats in the Australian Senate

	First party	Second party
Leader	Paul Keating	John Hewson
Party	Labor	Liberal/National coalition
Last election	1 seat	4 seats
Seats won	4 seats	1 seat
Seat change	▲3	▼3
Popular vote	143,621	129,132
Percentage	46.8%	42.0%
Swing	▲7.0	▼6.6
TPP	54.65%	45.35%
TPP swing	▲6.75	▼6.75

This is a list of electoral division results for the Australian 1993 federal election in the state of Tasmania.

== Overall results ==
Turnout 96.3% (CV) — Informal 2.7%
Party	Votes	%	Swing	Seats	Change
Labor	143,621	46.76	+7.02	4	▲3
Liberal	129,132	42.04	−6.58	1	▼3
Greens	24,319	7.92	+5.72		
Democrats	7,653	2.49	−6.10		
Independents	1,544	0.50	−0.25		
Call to Australia	871	0.28			
Total	307,140			5	
Two-party-preferred vote
Labor	167,780	54.65	+6.75	4	▲3
Liberal	139,239	45.35	−6.75	1	▼3
Invalid/blank votes	8,634	2.73	−0.53		
Turnout	315,774	96.30			
Registered voters	327,919				
Source: Federal Elections 1993

== Results by division ==
=== Bass ===
1993 Australian federal election: Bass
Party	Candidate	Votes	%	±%
Liberal	Warwick Smith	29,187	47.32	−2.79
Labor	Silvia Smith	27,014	43.80	+6.11
Greens	David Hunnerup	3,907	6.33	+2.09
Democrats	Brian Austen	1,572	2.55	−5.41
Total formal votes		61,680	97.16	+0.41
Informal votes		1,805	2.84	−0.41
Turnout		63,485	96.02	
Two-party-preferred result
Labor	Silvia Smith	30,850	50.03	+4.54
Liberal	Warwick Smith	30,810	49.97	−4.54
Labor gain from Liberal		Swing	+4.54	

=== Braddon ===
1993 Australian federal election: Braddon
Party	Candidate	Votes	%	±%
Liberal	Chris Miles	29,863	49.38	−5.91
Labor	Mike Gard	25,365	41.94	+6.40
Greens	John Coombes	2,426	4.01	+4.01
Democrats	Jim Reilly	1,676	2.77	−3.89
Independent	Royce Lohrey	1,151	1.90	+1.90
Total formal votes		60,481	97.26	+0.77
Informal votes		1,705	2.74	−0.77
Turnout		62,186	96.63	
Two-party-preferred result
Liberal	Chris Miles	31,952	52.85	−5.41
Labor	Mike Gard	28,509	47.15	+5.41
Liberal hold		Swing	−5.41	

=== Denison ===
1993 Australian federal election: Denison
Party	Candidate	Votes	%	±%
Labor	Duncan Kerr	32,793	51.27	+6.70
Liberal	Phil Ryan	20,056	31.35	−9.24
Greens	Bob Brown	9,093	14.22	+7.86
Call to Australia	Euan Vance	871	1.36	+1.36
Democrats	Kevin Anderson	759	1.19	−5.61
	Teresa Dowding	393	0.61	+0.61
Total formal votes		63,965	97.39	−0.18
Informal votes		1,717	2.61	+0.18
Turnout		65,682	95.75	
Two-party-preferred result
Labor	Duncan Kerr	41,195	64.44	+8.45
Liberal	Phil Ryan	22,733	35.56	−8.45
Labor hold		Swing	+8.45	

=== Franklin ===
1993 Australian federal election: Franklin
Party	Candidate	Votes	%	±%
Labor	Harry Quick	29,238	49.20	+10.33
Liberal	Graeme Gilbert	23,030	38.75	−9.86
Greens	Louise Crossley	4,878	8.21	+8.21
Democrats	James Richard	2,281	3.84	−8.68
Total formal votes		59,427	97.42	+0.45
Informal votes		1,576	2.58	−0.45
Turnout		61,003	96.60	
Two-party-preferred result
Labor	Harry Quick	34,119	57.43	+9.64
Liberal	Graeme Gilbert	25,288	42.57	−9.64
Labor gain from Liberal		Swing	+9.64	

=== Lyons ===
1993 Australian federal election: Lyons
Party	Candidate	Votes	%	±%
Labor	Dick Adams	29,211	47.43	+5.63
Liberal	Rene Hidding	26,996	43.83	−5.04
Greens	Michael Morris	4,015	6.52	+6.52
Democrats	Leonie Godridge	1,365	2.22	−7.11
Total formal votes		61,587	97.11	+1.25
Informal votes		1,831	2.89	−1.25
Turnout		63,418	96.53	
Two-party-preferred result
Labor	Dick Adams	33,107	53.78	+5.72
Liberal	Rene Hidding	28,456	46.22	−5.72
Labor gain from Liberal		Swing	+5.72	

== See also ==
- Results of the 1993 Australian federal election (House of Representatives)
- Members of the Australian House of Representatives, 1993–1996
