= Results of the 1990 Australian federal election in Tasmania =

1990 Australian federal election (Tasmania)
- 24 March 1990

All 5 Tasmanian seats in the Australian House of Representatives and 6 seats in the Australian Senate
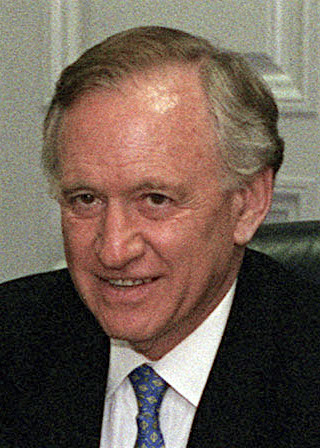

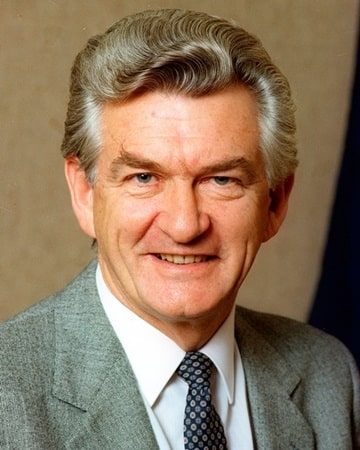
	First party	Second party
Leader	Andrew Peacock	Bob Hawke
Party	Liberal/National coalition	Labor
Last election	4 seats	1 seat
Seats won	4 seats	1 seat
Seat change	Steady	Steady
Popular vote	140,722	115,053
Percentage	48.61%	39.74%
Swing	▼2.44	▼3.25
TPP	52.1%	47.9%
TPP swing	▼1.0	▲1.0

This is a list of electoral division results for the Australian 1990 federal election in the state of Tasmania.

== Overall results ==
Turnout 96.5% (CV) — Informal 2.3%
Party	Votes	%	Swing	Seats	Change
Liberal	140,722	48.61	−2.44	4	Steady
Labor	115,053	39.74	−3.25	1	Steady
Democrats	24,876	8.59	+2.63		Steady
United Tasmania	6,367	2.20			
Independent	2,159	0.75			
Democratic Socialist	327	0.11			
Total	289,504			5	
Two-party-preferred vote
Liberal	138,556	52.10	−1.00	4	Steady
Labor	150,709	47.90	+1.00	1	Steady
Invalid/blank votes	9,774	3.27	−1.68		
Turnout	299,278	96.5			
Registered voters	300,763				
Source: Federal Elections 1990

== Results by division ==
=== Bass ===
1990 Australian federal election: Bass
Party	Candidate	Votes	%	±%
Liberal	Warwick Smith	28,441	49.9	−1.9
Labor	Silvia Smith	21,619	37.9	−5.0
Democrats	Rae Saxon	4,449	7.8	+2.4
United Tasmania	John Chester	2,479	4.4	+4.4
Total formal votes		56,988	96.7	
Informal votes		1,928	3.3	
Turnout		58,916	96.4	
Two-party-preferred result
Liberal	Warwick Smith	30,896	54.3	+0.6
Labor	Silvia Smith	26,005	45.7	−0.6
Liberal hold		Swing	+0.6	

=== Braddon ===
1990 Australian federal election: Braddon
Party	Candidate	Votes	%	±%
Liberal	Chris Miles	31,860	55.5	−2.4
Labor	Terry Hynes	20,325	35.4	−6.7
Democrats	James Reilly	3,808	6.6	+6.6
Independent	Tom Egglestone	1,458	2.5	+2.5
Total formal votes		57,451	96.5	
Informal votes		2,079	3.5	
Turnout		59,530	96.9	
Two-party-preferred result
Liberal	Chris Miles	33,553	58.4	+0.5
Labor	Terry Hynes	23,879	41.6	−0.5
Liberal hold		Swing	+0.5	

=== Denison ===
1990 Australian federal election: Denison
Party	Candidate	Votes	%	±%
Labor	Duncan Kerr	25,811	45.0	−3.3
Liberal	Michael Hodgman	23,056	40.2	−4.2
United Tasmania	Geoff Law	3,888	6.8	+6.8
Democrats	Rob Alliston	3,554	6.2	−1.1
Independent	Graeme Jones	701	1.2	+1.2
Democratic Socialist	Ian Hopkins	327	0.6	+0.6
Total formal votes		57,337	97.6	
Informal votes		1,438	2.4	
Turnout		58,775	96.3	
Two-party-preferred result
Labor	Duncan Kerr	32,333	56.4	+2.6
Liberal	Michael Hodgman	24,956	43.6	−2.6
Labor hold		Swing	+2.6	

=== Franklin ===
1990 Australian federal election: Franklin
Party	Candidate	Votes	%	±%
Liberal	Bruce Goodluck	28,636	48.5	−1.7
Labor	Eugene Alexander	22,925	38.8	−1.6
Democrats	Patsy Harmsen	7,523	12.7	+3.3
Total formal votes		59,084	97.0	
Informal votes		1,819	3.0	
Turnout		60,903	96.7	
Two-party-preferred result
Liberal	Bruce Goodluck	30,778	52.1	−1.2
Labor	Eugene Alexander	28,268	47.9	+1.2
Liberal hold		Swing	−1.2	

=== Lyons ===
1990 Australian federal election: Lyons
Party	Candidate	Votes	%	±%
Liberal	Max Burr	28,729	49.0	−1.9
Labor	Bob Gordon	24,373	41.6	+0.3
Democrats	Mike Hancock	5,542	9.5	+1.7
Total formal votes		58,644	95.9	
Informal votes		2,510	4.1	
Turnout		61,154	96.3	
Two-party-preferred result
Liberal	Max Burr	30,526	52.1	−2.3
Labor	Bob Gordon	28,071	47.9	+2.3
Liberal hold		Swing	−2.3	

== See also ==
- Results of the 1990 Australian federal election (House of Representatives)
- Members of the Australian House of Representatives, 1990–1993
