= Tasmanian News =

Australian newspaper

- The public good must be preferred to private advantage
- Type: Daily afternoon newspaper
- Founded: 17 November 1883
- Ceased publication: 17 November 1911
- Headquarters: Hobart, Tasmania

Tasmanian News was an Australian afternoon newspaper based in Hobart. Originally published as The Tasmanian News, its first issue appeared on Saturday 17 November 1883.

The paper was owned and edited by Henry Horatio Gill (1840–1914). He ran the newspaper until his retirement from journalism. His wife, Sara Inez Gill (née Jacobs, c.1850–1914) took over as proprietor on 26 July 1886, just three months after the birth of their youngest child.

Editors of the Tasmanian News included G. B. Lilley, J. D. Shaw, R. W. Smith, J. J. Utting and Alexander Williamson Hume.

William James McWilliams took over the paper from Sara in August 1896. He published the News until he was forced to sell out in June 1900 due to financial difficulties and William Bell Fulton took over as proprietor.

The last issue was published on Friday 17 November 1911, 28 years to the day after its first. A notice signed by A. J. Nettlefold, managing director of The Daily Post, Ltd., advised that the paper had ceased publication but was seeking new premises and would recommence in nine months' time.

== Digitisation ==
The newspaper has been digitised and is available on Trove.
