= Andrew Goledzinowski =

Australian diplomat

Andrew Goledzinowski AM
- Goledzinowski in 2026

Australian Ambassador to Vietnam
- In office 30 September 2022 – December 2024
- Preceded by: Robyn Mudie
- Succeeded by: Gillian Bird

Australian High Commissioner to Malaysia
- In office 2018–2021
- Preceded by: Rod Smith
- Succeeded by: Justin Lee

Personal details
- Born: Andrew John Lech Goledzinowski
- Spouse: Lynette Allan
- Education: University of New South Wales (BJuris, LLB)
- Occupation: Diplomat
- Andrew Goledzinowski's voice Goledzinowski speaking about ASEAN; Recorded 26 August 2025

Andrew John Lech Goledzinowski AM is an Australian career diplomat who served as ambassador to Vietnam from 2022 to 2024.

He was previously appointed High Commissioner to Malaysia in 2017, serving in this position from 2018 to 2021, Ambassador and Deputy Permanent Representative to the United Nations in New York (2008–2011) and Deputy Head of Mission at the UN permanent mission to Geneva (1998–2000).

Goledzinowski was Australia's Ambassador for People Smuggling and Human Trafficking issues from December 2014 to September 2017. As co-chair of the 49 members Bali Process Senior Officials Committee, he oversaw negotiation of the Bali Ministerial Declaration in 2016 and the establishment, with Andrew Forrest, of the business track of the Bali Process. He was a principal negotiator of the agreement struck with the Obama administration for the resettlement of refugees from Nauru and Manus Island to the United States.

He has served as head of the World Bank office in Baghdad in 2004, as Senior Official of the Coalition Provisional Authority in Iraq from 2003 to 2004, and as Chief of Staff to the United Nations High Commissioner for Human Rights from 2000 to 2002.

Goledzinowski was Senior Advisor to two Australian Foreign Ministers: Alexander Downer (Liberal) 2006 to 2007 and Gareth Evans (Labor) 1994 to 1996.

In addition to overseas postings in Wellington, Pretoria, Port Vila, Geneva, Baghdad, New York, Kuala Lumpur and Hanoi, he has led Emergency Response Teams (ERTs) to Iraq in 2005, Syria in 2006, and Ukraine in 2022. In 2014, he led a 15-country, 92-member Multinational Observer Group (MOG) to monitor Fiji's return-to-democracy election.

For his services in Iraq, he was appointed a Member of the Order of Australia in the 2004 Queen's Birthday Honours and was awarded the U.S. Secretary's Medal for Exceptional Public Service. In 2020, he received the DFAT Secretary's Award for Excellence in Innovation for his effective use of social media.

He holds a Bachelor of Laws (1983) and Bachelor of Jurisprudence (1980) from the University of New South Wales.

Goledzinowski has an interest in the performing arts. From 1991 to 1993 he was on the board of the Meryl Tankard Dance Company. From 1993 to 1995 he was Chair of Vis-a-Vis Dance Canberra. In 1996 he founded the Australian Choreographic Centre, which he chaired until mid 1998.

== See also ==
- List of ambassadors of Australia to Vietnam
