= Jack Frost (politician) =

Australian politician (1911–1995)

Stewart Charles Hilton "Jack" Frost (12 November 1911 – 27 September 1995) was an Australian politician. The son of federal MP Charles Frost, he was born in Margate, Tasmania. After contesting the federal seat of Franklin unsuccessfully for the Labor Party in 1949, 1951 and 1954, he was elected to the Tasmanian House of Assembly for Franklin in 1964. He was Chair of Committees in 1974 and a minister from 1974 to 1976, when he lost his seat.
