= List of high commissioners of Australia to Sri Lanka =

High Commissioner of Australia to Sri Lanka

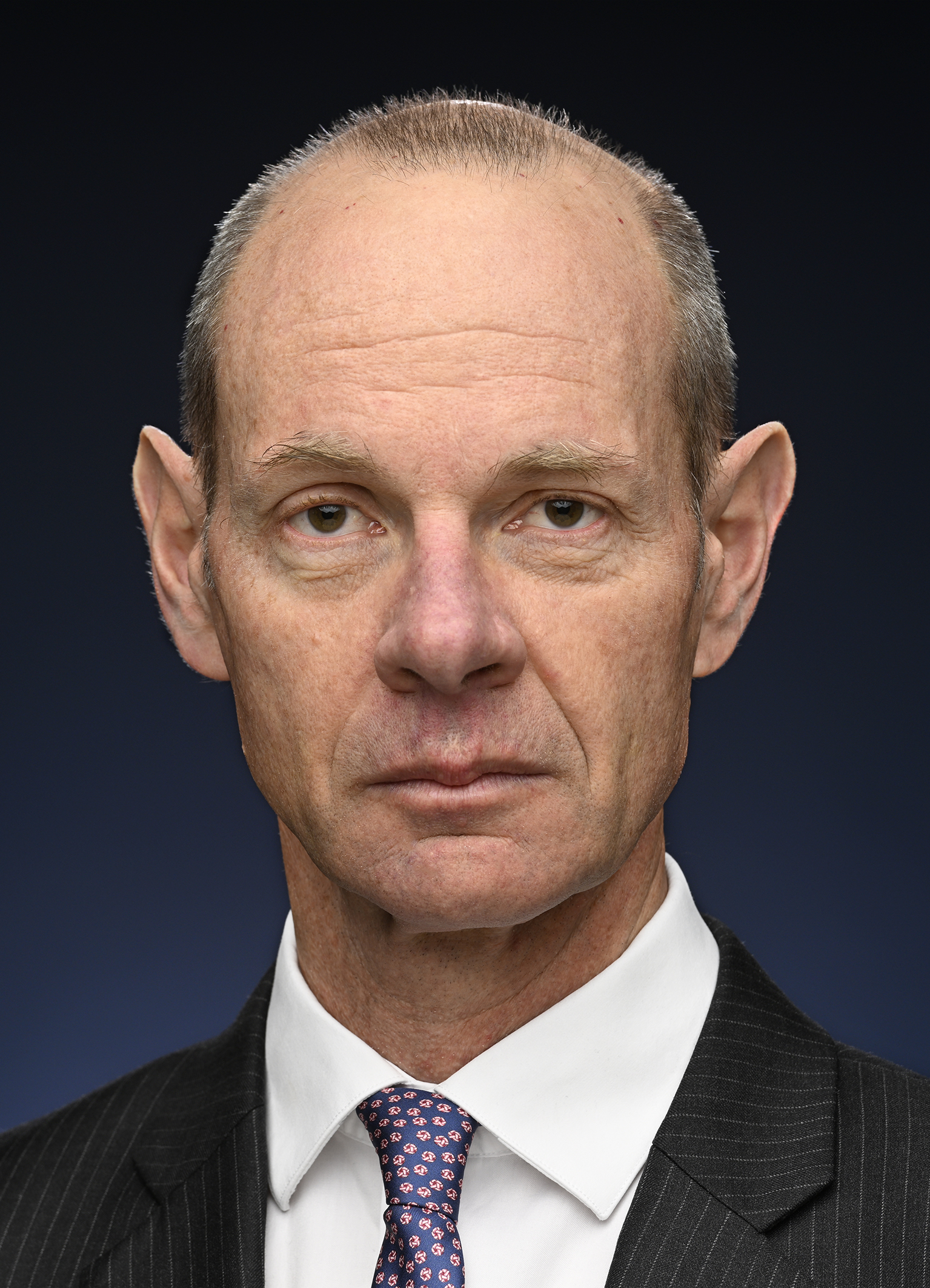
- Incumbent; Paul Stephens since 6 July 2022
- Department of Foreign Affairs and Trade
- Style: His Excellency
- Seat: Colombo
- Nominator: Prime Minister of Australia
- Appointer: Governor-General of Australia
- Inaugural holder: Charles Frost (as Commissioner of Australia to the Colony of Ceylon)
- Formation: 19 December 1946
- Website: Australian High Commission, Colombo

The high commissioner of Australia to Sri Lanka is an officer of the Australian Department of Foreign Affairs and Trade and the head of the High Commission of the Commonwealth of Australia to the Democratic Socialist Republic of Sri Lanka in Colombo. The high commissioner has the rank and status of an ambassador extraordinary and plenipotentiary and also holds non-resident accreditation as high commissioner to the Maldives since 1974. The high commissioner since July 2022 is Paul Stephens. On 6 July 2025, Mr Matthew Duckworth was announced as Australia’s next High Commissioner to Sri Lanka.

== History of relations and office ==
Sri Lanka and Australia have enjoyed official diplomatic relations since December 1946, following the decision of the British Government to grant limited self-government to Ceylon, with the first parliamentary elections being held by late 1947. As a consequence of the limited sovereign status of Ceylon (possessing neither Dominion status nor full independence) the government of Ben Chifley made the decision to appoint a Commissioner, who had diplomatic standing but not the same powers or rank as a full high commissioner. In the announcement the Australian Government clarified that: "The new title of Commissioner for the appointment [was] chosen because of the unique status which Ceylon will enjoy in the Empire. It will have a legislature patterned on Dominion Parliaments, but as it will lack Dominion or foreign country status, it would be inappropriate for Australia to appoint either a high commissioner or a minister." On 16 January 1947 the first Commissioner was appointed, Charles Frost, a former Labor member of parliament and minister who had lost his seat at the 1946 election. When Ceylon was granted Dominion status, Frost was upgraded to full high commissioner and was present at the swearing-in of the first Governor-General of Ceylon, Sir Henry Monck-Mason Moore, on 4 February 1948.

Frost's appointment did not go without protest however, given the political nature of the appointment, and his performance came under increased scrutiny in late 1948 when Australian businessman V. M. Segal criticised him for neglecting Australia's fledgling trade interests in the country and not having the proper credentials to serve in such a post: "With his staff, he is kept there at considerable expense to this country. It is the biggest sinecure I know." With a change in government, the new Liberal government of Prime Minister Robert Menzies made the decision to terminate Frost's appointment early (he had been commissioned to serve a five-year term) on 5 October 1950. On 19 January 1951 the Minister for External Affairs, Percy Spender, appointed a career diplomat, Dr John Burton, to succeed Frost as high commissioner. However, Burton's tenure also proved short-lived when he resigned his office on 28 March 1951, notifying Spender that he had resigned to contest the April 1951 federal election as a Labor candidate for the seat of Lowe against the sitting member, William McMahon (he was unsuccessful). On 22 May 1972, the Government of Ceylon approved a new republican constitution that renamed the country 'Sri Lanka' and changed its status to that of a Republic within the Commonwealth.

=== Relations with the Maldives ===
In 1974, Australia established diplomatic relations with the Republic of Maldives and the high commissioner in Colombo received non-resident accreditation as high commissioner to the Maldives. Between July 1982 and October 2016, and since 1 February 2020, the Australian high commissioner to Sri Lanka has also been high commissioner to the Maldives. Between 1974 and 1982, and from October 2016 to 1 February 2020, this office was as Ambassador.

== Office-holders ==
#	Officeholder	Title	Other offices	Term start date	Term end date	Time in office	Notes
1	Charles Frost	Commissioner of Australia to the Colony of Ceylon		16 January 1947	4 February 1948	3 years, 262 days	
1	Charles Frost	High Commissioner of Australia to the Dominion of Ceylon		4 February 1948	5 October 1950	3 years, 262 days	
2	Dr John Burton	High Commissioner of Australia to the Dominion of Ceylon		19 January 1951	28 March 1951	68 days	
−	Alex Borthwick	Chargé d'affaires		28 March 1951	29 February 1952	338 days	
3	Roden Cutler VC	High Commissioner of Australia to the Dominion of Ceylon		29 February 1952	14 June 1955	3 years, 106 days	
4	Allan Eastman	High Commissioner of Australia to the Dominion of Ceylon		1956	1958	1–2 years	
5	Charles Kevin	High Commissioner of Australia to the Dominion of Ceylon		1959	1961	1–2 years	
6	Bertram Ballard	High Commissioner of Australia to the Dominion of Ceylon		16 July 1962	7 December 1965	3 years, 144 days	
7	Gordon Upton	High Commissioner of Australia to the Dominion of Ceylon		7 December 1965	22 January 1970	4 years, 46 days	
8	H. D. White	High Commissioner of Australia to the Dominion of Ceylon		22 January 1970	30 April 1972	2 years, 99 days	
9	H. G. Marshall	High Commissioner of Australia to the Dominion of Ceylon		30 April 1972	22 May 1972	3 years, 79 days	
9	H. G. Marshall	High Commissioner of Australia to Sri Lanka	^{A}	22 May 1972	18 July 1975	3 years, 79 days	
10	Alex Borthwick	High Commissioner of Australia to Sri Lanka	^{A}	18 July 1975	31 October 1979	4 years, 105 days	
11	Warwick Mayne-Wilson	High Commissioner of Australia to Sri Lanka	^{A}	31 October 1979	12 February 1982	2 years, 104 days	
12	David Rutter	High Commissioner of Australia to Sri Lanka	^{A}^{B}	12 February 1982	15 March 1985	3 years, 31 days	
13	Robert Cotton	High Commissioner of Australia to Sri Lanka	^{B}	15 March 1985	February 1988	2 years, 10 months	
14	Tonia Shand AM	High Commissioner of Australia to Sri Lanka	^{B}	February 1988	December 1991	3 years, 10 months	
15	Howard Debenham	High Commissioner of Australia to Sri Lanka	^{B}	1 January 1992	March 1995	3 years, 2 months	
16	Bill Tweddell	High Commissioner of Australia to Sri Lanka	^{B}	March 1995	July 1996	1 year, 4 months	
17	David Ritchie AO	High Commissioner of Australia to Sri Lanka	^{B}	July 1996	January 1999	2 years, 6 months	
18	Peter Rowe	High Commissioner of Australia to Sri Lanka	^{B}	January 1999	January 2002	3 years	
19	David Binns	High Commissioner of Australia to Sri Lanka	^{B}	January 2002	January 2005	3 years	
20	Dr Greg French	High Commissioner of Australia to Sri Lanka	^{B}	January 2005	February 2008	3 years, 1 month	
21	Kathy Klugman	High Commissioner of Australia to Sri Lanka	^{B}	February 2008	7 January 2012	3 years, 11 months	
22	Robyn Mudie	High Commissioner of Australia to Sri Lanka	^{B}	7 January 2012	2016	3–4 years	
23	Bryce Hutchesson	High Commissioner of Australia to Sri Lanka	^{A}^{B}	February 2016	29 January 2019	2 years, 11 months	
24	David Holly	High Commissioner of Australia to Sri Lanka	^{A}^{B}	29 January 2019	6 July 2022	3 years, 158 days	
25	Paul Stephens	High Commissioner of Australia to Sri Lanka	^{B}	6 July 2022	incumbent	4 years, 63 days	

=== Notes ===
^A Also served as non-resident Ambassador to the Republic of Maldives, between 1974 and 1982, and between October 2016 to 1 February 2020.
^B Also served as non-resident High Commissioner to the Republic of Maldives, between July 1982 and October 2016, and since 1 February 2020.

== See also ==
- Australia–Sri Lanka relations
- Foreign relations of Australia
