= Samuel Hawkes (Australian politician) =

Australian politician

Member of the Tasmanian House of Assembly for Ringarooma
- In office 26 July 1886 – December 1893
- Preceded by: New seat
- Succeeded by: William McWilliams

Personal details
- Born: 27 September 1845 Witham, Essex
- Died: 16 February 1937 (aged 91) Scottsdale, Tasmania

Samuel Hawkes (27 September 1845 – 16 February 1937) was an Australian politician.

Hawkes was born in Witham in Essex in 1845. In 1886 he was elected to the Tasmanian House of Assembly, representing the seat of Ringarooma. He served until 1893. He died in 1937 in Scottsdale.

Tasmanian House of Assembly
New seat	Member for Ringarooma; 1886–1893	Succeeded by William McWilliams
