= Electoral district of Ringarooma =

Tasmanian House of Assembly electoral district

The Electoral district of Ringarooma was a single-member electoral district of the Tasmanian House of Assembly. It centred on the town of Ringarooma in north-eastern Tasmania.

The seat was created in a redistribution ahead of the 1886 election out of parts of the seats of George Town, Selby and Fingal, and was abolished when the Tasmanian parliament adopted the Hare-Clark electoral model in 1909.

== Members for Ringarooma ==
Member	Term
Samuel Hawkes	1886–1893
William McWilliams	1893–1900
Carmichael Lyne	1900–1906
Christopher O'Reilly	1906–1909
