= Bill Falkinder =

Australian politician

Bill Falkinder CBE, DSO, DFC & Bar
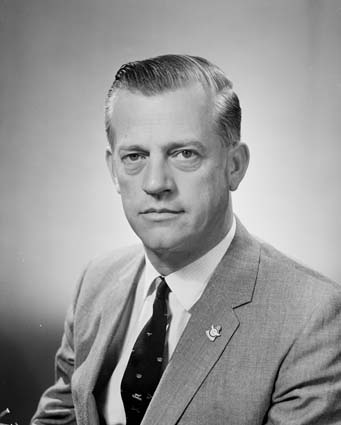

Member of the Australian Parliament for Franklin
- In office 28 September 1946 – 31 October 1966
- Preceded by: Charles Frost
- Succeeded by: Thomas Pearsall

Personal details
- Born: 29 August 1921 Hobart, Tasmania
- Died: 11 July 1993 (aged 71) Hobart, Tasmania
- Party: Liberal Party of Australia
- Occupation: Air Force officer

Military service
- Allegiance: Australia
- Branch/service: Royal Australian Air Force (1940–45); Royal Australian Air Force Reserve (1945–67)
- Years of service: 1940–1967
- Rank: Wing Commander
- Battles/wars: Second World War
- Awards: Distinguished Service Order; Distinguished Flying Cross & Bar

Charles William Jackson Falkinder, CBE, DSO, DFC & Bar (29 August 1921 – 11 July 1993) was an Australian air force officer and politician.

Born in Hobart, Tasmania, he was educated at Hobart High School and served in the Royal Australian Air Force (RAAF) from 1940 to 1945 during the Second World War. Attached to the Royal Air Force's Bomber Command and later Pathfinder Force for much of this time, Falkinder flew some 117 missions over occupied Europe and was decorated with the Distinguished Service Order, Distinguished Flying Cross and Bar. He continued to serve in the RAAF Reserve after the war, rising to the rank of wing commander.

In 1946 he was elected to the Australian House of Representatives as the Liberal member for Franklin, narrowly defeating Labor minister Charles Frost with a ten percent swing. He was elected to parliament at the age of 25 and as of 2021 is the youngest Tasmanian to have served in federal parliament. he is He held the seat until his retirement in 1966. Appointed a Commander of the Order of the British Empire for his service, Bill Falkinder died in 1993.

Parliament of Australia
Preceded by Charles Frost	Member for Franklin; 1946–1966	Succeeded by Thomas Pearsall
