= Graeme Gilbert =

Australian radio presenter (1950–2026)

Graeme Gilbert (15 April 1950 – 17 July 2026) was an Australian radio presenter.

== Life and career ==
Gilbert was the host of nightly radio program Talk Tonight with Graeme Gilbert on Sydney radio station 2SM and the Super Radio Network until 2023. He has hosted the show for over a decade and has interviewed notable people including John Howard, the former Prime Minister of Australia. Gilbert has received a B&T Award for Best News Presenter and a RAWARD for Best Current Affairs Commentator. Gilbert ran as a Liberal Party candidate for the division of Franklin, Tasmania, in the 1993 Australian federal election. He lost with 9.86% swing against him.

On 15 May 2006, his program was barraged by calls from members of the public, incorrectly stating that the answer to his trivia question, "Who is the Premier of Tasmania?", was "India" (the correct answer being Paul Lennon). The joke persists to this day, with callers randomly saying "India" on air. The story was picked up by ABC Television's Media Watch program.

Gilbert died on 17 July 2026, at the age of 76, following an ongoing battle with acute leukaemia, after spending his final months in aged care.
