= Tonia Shand =

Australian diplomat and public servant (1939–2020)

High Commissioner of Australia to Sri Lanka
- In office February 1988 – December 1991
- Preceded by: Robert Cotton
- Succeeded by: Howard Debenham

Personal details
- Born: Tonia Louise Moffat; 6 November 1939 United Kingdom
- Died: 15 July 2020 (aged 80) Canberra, Australia
- Education: University of Melbourne

Tonia Louise Shand AM (6 November 1939 – 15 July 2020) was an Australian diplomat and public servant, who served as Australia's first woman High Commissioner to Sri Lanka from 1988 to 1991.

== Early life and education ==
Shand was born Tonia Louise Moffat in Britain in 1939 to Australian parents, Gordon and Marjorie Moffatt. She and her mother moved to Melbourne, Victoria when World War II began, while her civil engineer father was posted to Singapore with the Royal Air Force where he built airfields.

Shand graduated from the University of Melbourne with a BA, majoring in German and political science.

== Career ==
Following graduation, Shand joined the Department of External Affairs (now DFAT) and she was posted to Tel Aviv, Bonn, Geneva and Stockholm. The marriage bar that existed in the Australian public service at the time forced her to resign when she married Richard (Ric or Ricky) Shand, however she was able to return in a temporary capacity until the birth of their daughter Brigit in October 1964.

In 1973 she, a married woman with a child, was given permission to join the staff of the High Commission in Delhi, India from 1973 to 1975. Her next overseas posting was as Deputy High Commissioner in Kuala Lumpur from 1979 to 1982. In 1983, she became the first woman in Australia to be appointed Chief of Protocol. In 1985, while Assistant Secretary of the Peace and Disarmament Branch of the Department of Foreign Affairs, she was appointed by Bill Hayden to the Consultative Committee on Peace and Disarmament, a 19-member committee convened to prepare for the International Year of Peace in 1986.

In 1988, three years after the death of her daughter, she was posted by Michael Duffy to Sri Lanka as High Commissioner. She was the first woman to fill that role, which also included non-resident High Commissioner to the Maldives.

Shand was appointed a Member of the Order of Australia in the 1990 Queen's Birthday Honours. In 2005, she was interviewed by Michael Wilson for the National Library of Australia's Australian diplomats 1950–2000 collection.

She died in Canberra on 15 July 2020. Her husband had predeceased her in 2014.

Diplomatic posts
Preceded by Robert Cotton	High Commissioner of Australia to Sri Lanka; 1988–1991	Succeeded by Howard Debenham
