= Robyn Mudie =

Australian diplomat

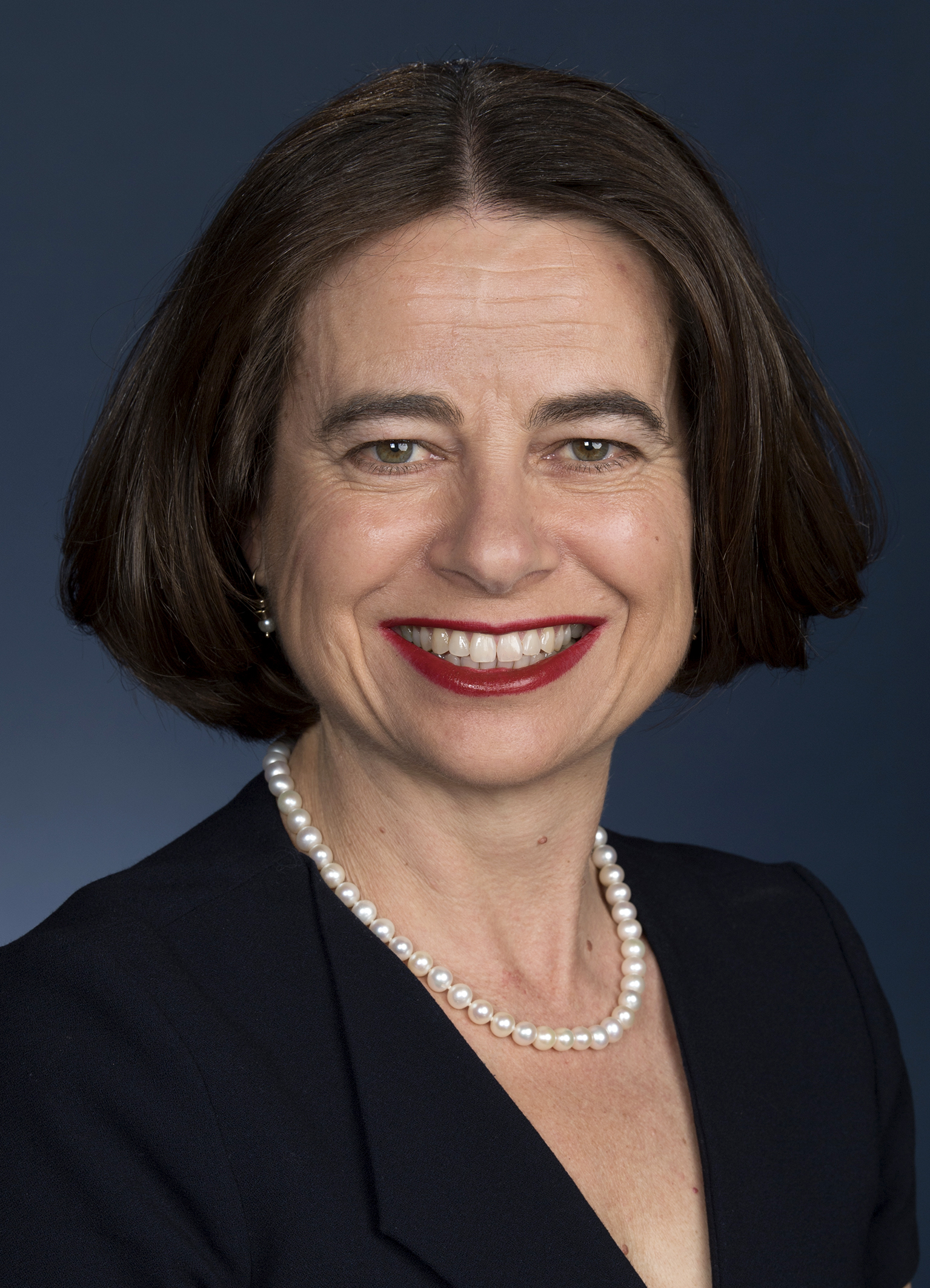
Mudie in 2019

Robyn Mudie is an Australian diplomat who most recently served as the Ambassador to Vietnam from 2019 to 2022, and was the High Commissioner to Sri Lanka from 2012 until 2016 with non-resident accreditation to the Maldives.

== Education ==
Mudie was born and raised in Adelaide, Australia, and became interested in foreign policy and world affairs in college. She earned a Bachelor of Arts in politics and history from the University of Adelaide, and did further study in foreign affairs and trade at the Australian National University. She has a Master of Arts in Southeast Asian studies from the University of Hull.

== Career ==
Mudie is a career diplomat who first worked in Hanoi as a diplomat starting in 1993. She subsequently worked in New York in the Australian Permanent Mission to the United Nations; she was in New York City during the September 11 attacks.

Following her time in New York she worked in Geneva as Australia's representative to the United Nations. During this period she helped set up the United Nations Human Rights Council and was at its first meeting in 2006.

She then became the Australian High Commissioner to Sri Lanka and the Maldives, a position she held from 2012 until 2016. While there, her work projects included improving access to clean water. In 2019 she was named the Australian Ambassador to Vietnam. Her work in Vietnam has centered on advocating for leadership roles for women, reducing violence against women, providing aid and vaccines during the COVID-19 pandemic, development assistance including collaboration in agricultural research and celebrating 50 years of cooperation between Vietnam and Australia. Her term in Vietnam ended in September 2022.

Diplomatic posts
Preceded by Kathy Klugman	Australian High Commissioner to Sri Lanka; 2012–2016	Succeeded by Bryce Hutchesson
Preceded by Craig Chittick	Australian Ambassador to Vietnam; 2019–2022	Succeeded by Andrew Goledzinowski
