= Ray Sherry =

Australian politician

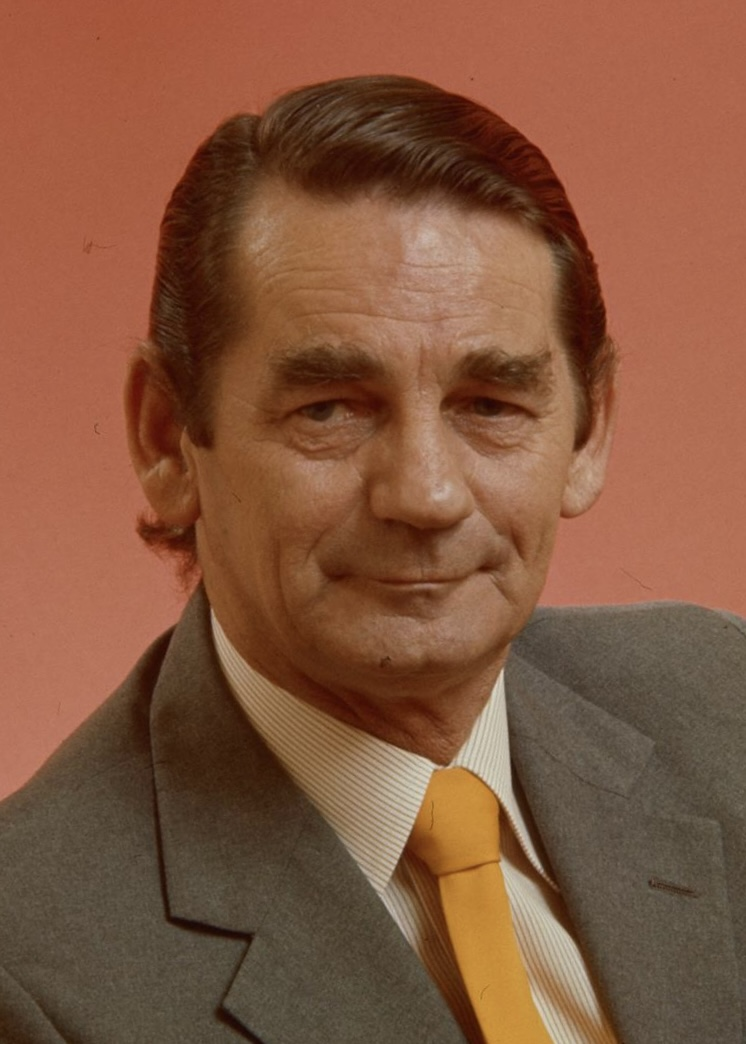
- Sherry in 1974

Member of the Australian Parliament for Franklin
- In office 25 October 1969 – 13 December 1975
- Preceded by: Thomas Pearsall
- Succeeded by: Bruce Goodluck

Personal details
- Born: 3 October 1924 Sydney, Australia
- Died: 13 June 1989 (aged 64)
- Party: Australian Labor Party
- Children: Nick Sherry
- Occupation: Actor

Raymond Henry Sherry (3 October 1924 – 13 June 1989) was an Australian politician. Born in Sydney, he was educated there at state schools. He spent 1941 to 1946 with the merchant navy before becoming an actor, television broadcaster and commentator, moving to Hobart in 1956. In 1969, he was elected to the Australian House of Representatives as the Labor member for Franklin, defeating Liberal MP Thomas Pearsall. He held the seat until his defeat by Liberal candidate Bruce Goodluck in 1975. In 1976 he entered the Tasmanian House of Assembly for Franklin, holding the seat until 1979. Sherry died in 1989. His son, Nick Sherry, was a Senator from Tasmania from 1990 to 2012.

Parliament of Australia
Preceded by Thomas Pearsall	Member for Franklin; 1969–1975	Succeeded by Bruce Goodluck
