= Thomas Pearsall (Australian politician) =

Australian politician

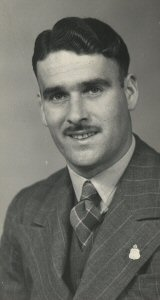

Member of the Australian Parliament for Franklin
- In office 26 November 1966 – 25 October 1969
- Preceded by: Bill Falkinder
- Succeeded by: Ray Sherry

Personal details
- Born: 11 April 1920 Hobart, Tasmania, Australia
- Died: 28 December 2003 (aged 83) Queensland, Australia
- Party: Liberal Party
- Occupation: Dairy farmer

Thomas Gordon Pearsall (11 April 1920 – 28 December 2003) was an Australian politician. Born in Hobart, Tasmania, he was educated at multiple state schools before becoming a dairy farmer at Kingston. He served in the military from 1940 to 1945 (TX6060 Lt 2/29 Infantry Battalion. POW Malaya and Thai-Burma Railway and served on Kingsborough Council. In 1950, he was elected to the Tasmanian House of Assembly as a Liberal member for Franklin. In 1966, he transferred to national politics, winning the federal House of Representatives seat of Franklin after the retirement of Bill Falkinder. He was defeated in 1969 by Labor candidate Ray Sherry, and returned to farming. Pearsall died in 2003.

Parliament of Australia
Preceded by Bill Falkinder	Member for Franklin; 1966–1969	Succeeded by Ray Sherry
