= Archibald Blacklow =

Australian politician (1879–1965)

Archibald Blacklow DSO, OBE
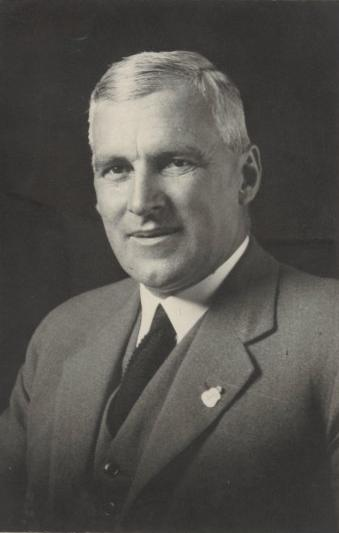

Member of the Australian Parliament for Franklin
- In office 19 December 1931 – 15 September 1934
- Preceded by: Charles Frost
- Succeeded by: Charles Frost

Personal details
- Born: 11 October 1879 Bagdad, Tasmania
- Died: 4 April 1965 (aged 85) Hobart, Tasmania, Australia
- Party: United Australia Party
- Education: University of Sydney
- Occupation: Pharmacist

Military service
- Allegiance: Australia
- Branch/service: Australian Army
- Years of service: 1899–1901; 1909–1924; 1942–c.1945
- Rank: Lieutenant Colonel
- Commands: 34th Battalion (1921–24); 3rd Machine Gun Battalion (1918–19)
- Battles/wars: First World War; Second World War
- Awards: Distinguished Service Order; Officer of the Order of the British Empire; Volunteer Officers' Decoration; Mentioned in Despatches (2)

Archibald Clifford Blacklow, DSO, OBE, VD (11 October 1879 – 4 April 1965) was an Australian politician. Born in Bagdad, Tasmania, he was educated in Hobart at Hutchins School and then at the University of Sydney, serving part-time in the New South Wales Militia between 1899 and 1901, and then the Australian Rifles between 1909 and 1913. He became a pharmacist in Sydney before serving full-time in the military during the First World War between 1916 and 1919, serving in the 36th and then 35th Infantry Battalions, and rising to command the 3rd Machine Gun Battalion on the Western Front in the final year of the war. For his leadership of the 3rd Machine Gun Battalion, he was invested with the Distinguished Service Order. Between 1921 and 1924 he commanded the 34th Infantry Battalion.

Returning to Tasmania in 1925, he became a dairy farmer and pastoralist. In 1931, he was elected to the Australian House of Representatives as the United Australia Party member for Franklin, defeating sitting Labor MP Charles Frost. However, he was defeated by Frost at the next election in 1934. In 1936 he was elected to the Tasmanian Legislative Council for Pembroke, where he remained until 1953 (during which time the United Australia Party became the Liberal Party). During the Second World War, he was active in the Volunteer Defence Corps. Blacklow died in 1965.

Parliament of Australia
| Preceded by Charles Frost | Member for Franklin; 1931–1934 | Succeeded by Charles Frost |
Tasmanian Legislative Council
| Preceded by John Murdoch | Member for Pembroke; 1936–1953 | Succeeded by William Dunbabin |
