= Charles Frost (politician) =

Australian politician and diplomat

The Honourable Charles Frost
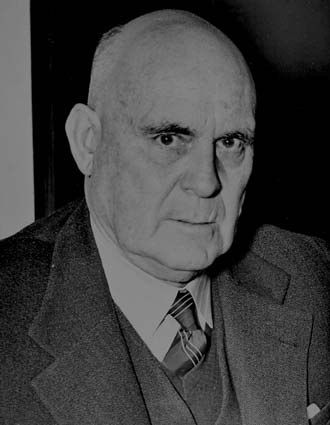

Member of the Australian Parliament for Franklin
- In office 14 December 1929 – 19 December 1931
- Preceded by: William McWilliams
- Succeeded by: Archibald Blacklow
- In office 15 September 1934 – 28 September 1946
- Preceded by: Archibald Blacklow
- Succeeded by: Bill Falkinder

Personal details
- Born: 30 November 1882 Hobart, Tasmania
- Died: 22 July 1964 (aged 81)
- Party: Australian Labor Party
- Spouse: Ruth Hornsey Young
- Children: Jack Frost
- Occupation: Orchardist

Charles William Frost (30 November 1882 – 22 July 1964) was an Australian politician and diplomat. He served in the House of Representatives from 1929 to 1931 and 1934 to 1946, representing the Labor Party. He was a minister in the Chifley government from 1941 to 1946, and later became Australian High Commissioner to Ceylon from 1947 to 1950.

== Early life ==
Frost was born in Hobart, Tasmania and educated at Koonya and Margate state schools, but left school at 13. He later worked at the Iron Blow mine near Queenstown. He married Ruth Hornsey Young in October 1906 and they had four children (including Jack, who would sit in the Tasmanian House of Assembly). He bought an orchard near Margate and in the late 1920s he was elected as a member of local Kingborough Council.

== Political career ==
Frost ran unsuccessfully for the division of Franklin in the Tasmanian Legislative Assembly in 1928. He won a by-election in 1929 for the Australian House of Representatives seat of Franklin for the Australian Labor Party. He lost the seat at the 1931 election, but won it back in the 1934 election. When John Curtin came to power in 1941, he was appointed Minister for Repatriation and Minister in charge of War Service Homes. He narrowly lost his seat at the 1946 election.

== Later life ==
On 16 January 1947, Frost took up an appointment as Australian Commissioner to Ceylon. The country was granted Dominion status in 1948 and his title was changed to High Commissioner. He was present for the swearing-in of Sir Henry Monck-Mason Moore as Governor-General of Ceylon on 4 February 1948. Later in 1948, Frost was criticised by Australian businessman V. M. Segal for neglecting Australia's trade interests and being unqualified for the post. Segal stated "he is kept there at considerable expense to this country. It is the biggest sinecure I know." Although he had been granted a five-year term, after the 1949 election the new Liberal government decided to terminate his appointment early on 5 October 1950. He was replaced by a career diplomat, John Burton.

Frost died in St John's Hospital, Hobart, on 22 July 1964.

== Notes ==
Political offices
Preceded by Herbert Collett	Minister for Repatriation; 1941–46	Succeeded by Claude Barnard
Preceded by Herbert Collett	Minister in charge of War Service Homes; 1941–45	Title abolished
Parliament of Australia
Preceded by William McWilliams	Member for Franklin; 1929–31	Succeeded by Archibald Blacklow
Preceded by Archibald Blacklow	Member for Franklin; 1934–46	Succeeded by Bill Falkinder
Diplomatic posts
New title	Australian Commissioner to Ceylon; 1947–1948	Succeeded by Himself as High Commissioner
New title	Australian High Commissioner to Ceylon; 1948–1950	Succeeded by John Burton
