= William McWilliams =

Australian politician (1856–1929)

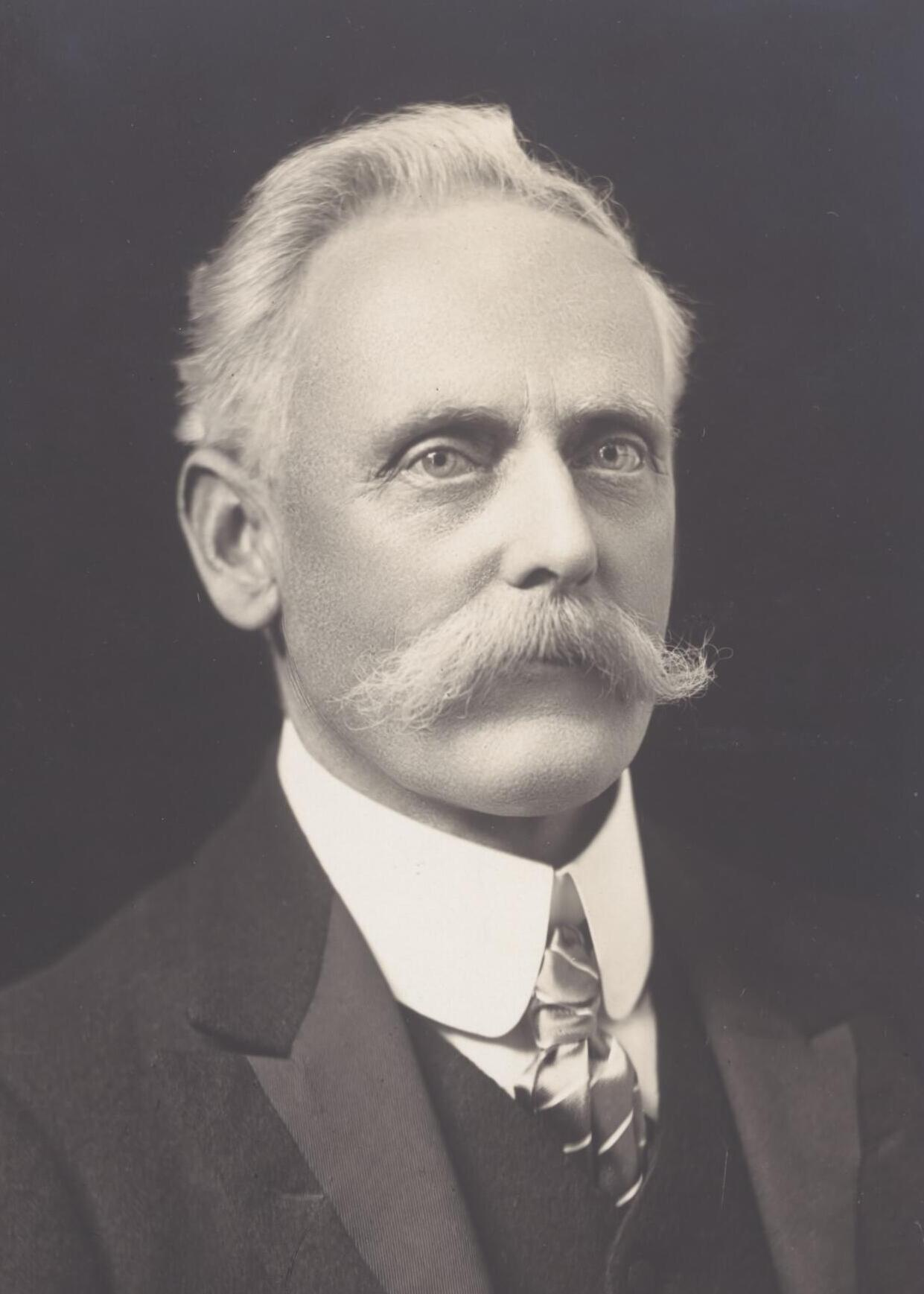

1st Leader of the Country Party
- In office 24 February 1920 – 5 April 1921
- Deputy: Edmund Jowett
- Succeeded by: Earle Page

Member of the Australian Parliament for Franklin
- In office 17 November 1928 – 22 October 1929
- Preceded by: Alfred Seabrook
- Succeeded by: Charles Frost
- In office 16 December 1903 – 16 December 1922
- Preceded by: New seat
- Succeeded by: Alfred Seabrook

Member of the Tasmanian House of Assembly for Ringarooma
- In office 1893–1900
- Preceded by: Samuel Hawkes
- Succeeded by: Carmichael Lyne

Personal details
- Born: 12 October 1856 Bream Creek, Tasmania, Australia
- Died: 22 October 1929 (aged 73) Battery Point, Tasmania, Australia
- Party: Revenue Tariff (1903–06); Anti-Socialist (1906–09); Liberal (1909–17); Nationalist (1917–20); Country (1920–22); Independent (1928–29)
- Spouse: Josephine Fullerton (m. 1893)
- Occupation: Journalist

William James McWilliams (12 October 1856 – 22 October 1929) was an Australian journalist and politician. He was the inaugural leader of the Country Party from 1920 to 1921 and served in federal parliament for nearly 20 years.

McWilliams was born in Bream Creek, Tasmania, to Irish immigrants. He became a journalist at a young age, working in both Hobart and Launceston, and becoming a newspaper editor and proprietor. McWilliams served in the Tasmanian House of Assembly from 1893 to 1900. He was elected to the House of Representatives at the 1903 federal election, standing as a Revenue Tariff candidate. He later affiliated with the Liberal Party and Nationalist Party, before helping co-found the Country Party after the 1919 election. McWilliams served briefly as the party's first leader before being replaced by Earle Page. He was defeated in 1922, but won re-election as an independent in 1928 where he contributed to the defeat of the Bruce–Page government.

== Early life ==
McWilliams was born on 12 October 1856 in Bream Creek, Tasmania. He was the third of five children of Eliza (née Caldwell) and Thomas James McWilliams. His parents were Irish immigrants – members of the Church of Ireland – who had immigrated to Tasmania in 1855 under an assisted passage scheme to establish the school at Franklin.

McWilliams initially followed his parents into the teaching profession but at the age of 20 moved to Hobart and began working as a journalist for the Tasmanian Mail. He later relocated to Launceston and worked for The Examiner as a parliamentary reporter. In 1883 he was appointed editor of The Telegraph, "advocating unimproved land taxes and reduced custom duties".

In 1896, McWilliams became the owner of the Tasmanian News, a Hobart-based afternoon newspaper. The following year he helped found the Southern Tasmanian Football Association, adopting the rules of the Victorian Football League.

== Politics ==
=== Colonial politics ===
McWilliams was elected to the Tasmanian House of Assembly at the 1893 general election, winning the seat of Ringarooma. He was a supporter of Edward Braddon's government and was re-elected at the 1897 election, but lost his seat in 1900.

In parliament, McWilliams advocated strongly on behalf of farmers, investigated the possibility of introducing sugarbeet farming into Tasmania, and helped found the Tasmanian Meteorological Bureau. He also supported giving women and ex-convicts the vote but opposed the Federation, believing it should be delayed.

=== Federal politics ===
Switching to federal politics, McWilliams won the Franklin at the 1903 election as a Revenue Tariffist supporting the Free Trade Party on most economic issues.

In parliament, McWilliams, like almost all his fellow members, strongly supported the White Australia Policy but opposed federal spending on issues such as the establishment of the High Court of Australia, a federal department of agriculture, a transcontinental railway, and federal acquisition of the Northern Territory. As in state parliament, McWilliams was a staunch advocate on rural matters, supporting the timber industry and primary producers.

=== Leader of the Country Party ===
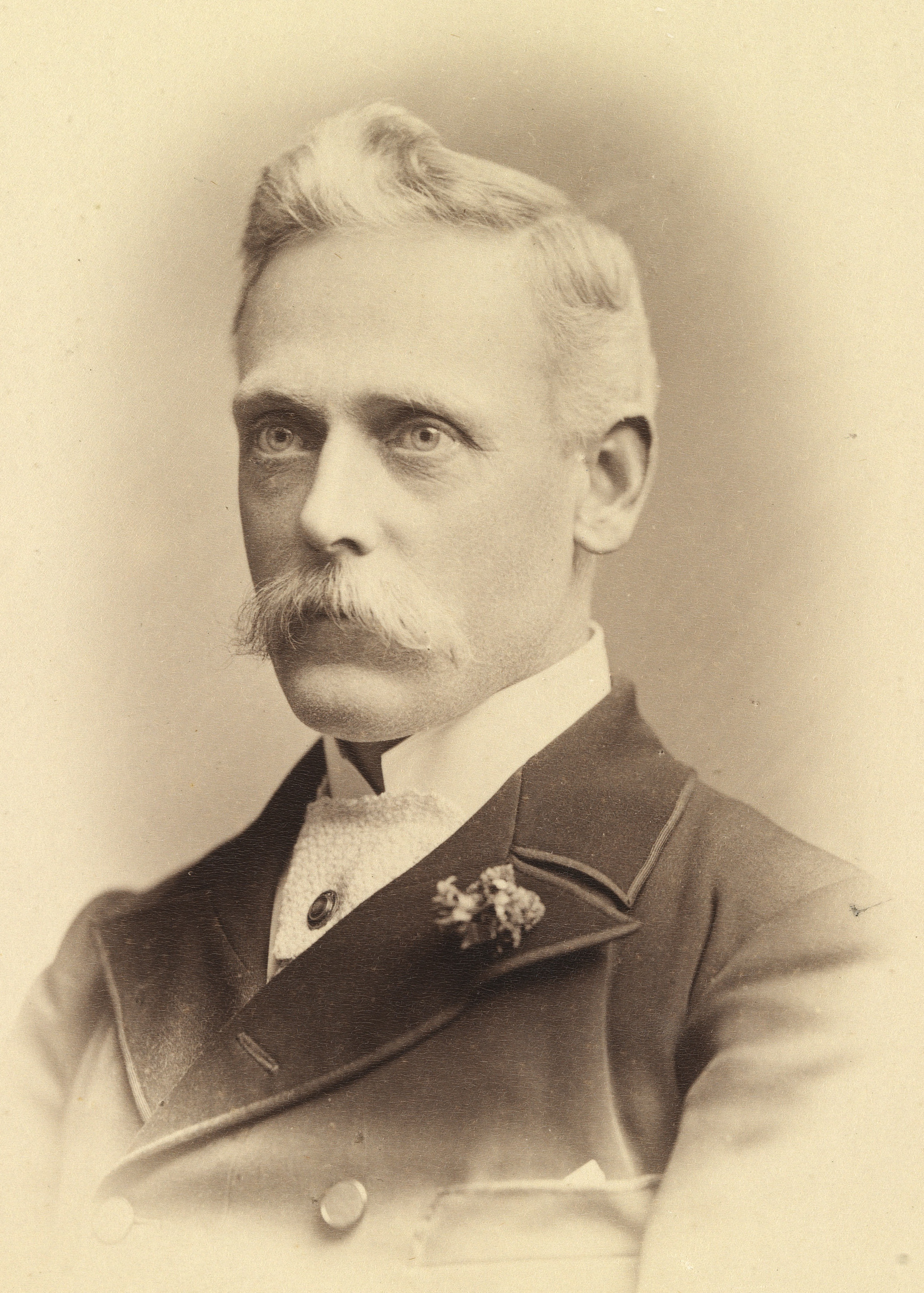
McWilliams as an MP

After the 1919 federal election, which saw a number of candidates elected with the endorsement of state-based farmers' organisations, McWilliams was one of a five signatories to a letter drafted by William Gibson calling for the formation of a parliamentary Country Party, alongside Henry Gregory, William Hill and Edmund Jowett. He was elected as the party's inaugural leader on 25 February 1920, with Jowett as his deputy, largely on the basis that he was the only member with prior experience in federal parliament.

In his first parliamentary speech as leader, McWilliams proclaimed that the Country Party would end the "cursed system of centralization, under which hundreds of thousands of pounds are squandered in our city Departments, whilst necessary adjuncts to civilization, in the way of telephonic communication and mail services are denied to the residents of our back-blocks". The Country Party had eleven members in the House of Representatives, giving it the balance of power after Prime Minister Billy Hughes' Nationalist Party government narrowly failed to win a majority. On 10 March 1920, McWilliams demonstrated the Country Party's power by moving a motion to restrict supply, which the government took as a confidence motion and survived by only four votes. However, the party's policy agenda was driven by the party's whip Earle Page.

On 5 April 1921, the parliamentary Country Party decided to review its leadership structure, declaring all leadership positions vacant. McWilliams was not a candidate to continue as leader, with Page elected nearly unanimously as his replacement. In his memoirs, Page recalled that McWilliams had "shown an increasing tendency to vote against the majority". On one instance he had been the sole Country MP to vote in favour of a censure motion introduced by the ALP opposition.

=== Final years in parliament ===
McWilliams was defeated in Franklin by the Nationalist candidate Alfred Seabrook at the 1922 federal election, and unsuccessfully sought to reclaim his seat at the 1925 election. According to The News, he reportedly sought the endorsement of the Nationalist Campaign Council, the Tasmanian body co-ordinating the anti-Labor candidates, but wished to be endorsed as a Country Party candidate rather than as a Nationalist. After his narrow defeat he stated that he had had "organised capital attacking on one side and organised labour on the other".

At the 1928 election, McWilliams finally defeated Seabrook as an independent, joining Country Progressive MP Percy Stewart on the crossbench. In the final months of the Bruce–Page government he regularly voted with the opposition, eventually joining Stewart and four dissident Nationalists in bringing down the government on a confidence motion in September 1929. He was re-elected at the 1929 election with an increased majority and by one account was "tacitly supported by Labor in the 1928 and 1929 elections".

== Personal life ==
In 1893, McWilliams married Josephine Fullerton (née Hardy), who had previously been widowed. The couple had three children, while a step-son William Fullerton also served in the Tasmanian House of Assembly.

McWilliams died suddenly from a heart attack at his home in Battery Point on 22 October 1929, just over a week after his re-election to parliament and on the same day of the declaration of the poll. He had been in poor health during the election campaign and had been bedridden since the day of the election.

Parliament of Australia
Preceded by Electorate created	Member for Franklin; 1903–1922	Succeeded by Alfred Seabrook
Preceded by Alfred Seabrook	Member for Franklin; 1928–1929	Succeeded by Charles Frost
