= Alfred Seabrook =

Australian politician

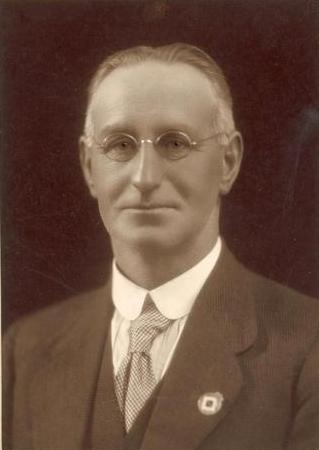

Member of the Australian Parliament for Franklin
- In office 16 December 1922 – 17 November 1928
- Preceded by: William McWilliams
- Succeeded by: William McWilliams

Personal details
- Born: 5 April 1867 Hobart, Tasmania
- Died: 11 June 1939 (aged 72)
- Party: Nationalist Party of Australia
- Occupation: Builder

Alfred Charles Seabrook (5 April 1867 – 11 June 1939) was an Australian politician. He was a Nationalist member of the Australian House of Representatives for Franklin from 1922 to 1928 and a United Australia Party member of the Tasmanian House of Assembly for Franklin from 1931 to 1934.

Seabrook was born in Hobart and was educated at Scotch College, Hobart. He initially followed his father into the building and contracting trade before entering into partnership in a produce and general merchant business, Seabrook and Neale, until it was dissolved in 1923. He was a long-standing member of the committee of the National Federation.

In 1922, he was elected to the Australian House of Representatives as the Nationalist member for Franklin, defeating Nationalist-turned-Country Party MP and inaugural leader of the Country Party William McWilliams. He held the seat until his defeat by McWilliams, running as an independent, in 1928.

He subsequently operated his own business as a fruit agent, A. C. Seabrook Pty Ltd.

In 1931, he was elected to the Tasmanian House of Assembly as a United Australia Party member for Franklin, but was defeated in 1934. He contested the Australian Senate as an independent at the 1934 federal election and changed his surname to "Ceabrook" to appear higher on the ballot paper, but was not successful. He had initially declared his candidacy as part of a self-proclaimed "Country Party" ticket, but they were disowned by the party and he continued his campaign as an independent.

Outside politics, Seabrook was a talented Australian rules footballer in his youth. Nicknamed 'Wobbler', he was a member of the first Tasmanian team to visit Victoria in 1887.

Seabrook died at Hobart in 1939.

Parliament of Australia
Preceded by William McWilliams	Member for Franklin; 1922 – 1928	Succeeded by William McWilliams
