= Bruce Goodluck =

Australian politician

Bruce Goodluck AM

Member of the Australian Parliament for Franklin
- In office 13 December 1975 – 8 February 1993
- Preceded by: Ray Sherry
- Succeeded by: Harry Quick

Personal details
- Born: 14 May 1933 Hobart, Tasmania, Australia
- Died: 24 October 2016 (aged 83) Hobart, Tasmania, Australia
- Party: Liberal Party of Australia
- Occupation: Company director

Bruce John Goodluck AM (14 May 1933 – 24 October 2016) was an Australian politician. He was a member of the House of Representatives from 1975 to 1993, representing the Liberal Party in the Tasmanian seat of Franklin. He later represented Franklin in the Tasmanian House of Assembly as an independent from 1996 to 1998.

== Early life ==
Goodluck was born on 14 May 1933 in Hobart, Tasmania. His mother left the family when he was seven years old and he was raised by his father Harry who worked as a boiler attendant at Boyer.

Goodluck spent his early years living in Dromedary, living in a house without electricity. He and his family later moved to the rural locality of Bundella on the Derwent River. At the age of thirteen he received an award from the Royal Humane Society of Australasia after rescuing a drowning child from the Derwent.

Goodluck received his early schooling from the state school at Bridgwater. He went on to attend Hobart High School, where he captained the school's cricket and football teams. His father died when he was 15 years old. At the age of 16, Goodluck was scouted by the Melbourne Football Club and moved to Victoria. He briefly played in the VFL thirds but soon returned to Tasmania.

After leaving school, Goodluck worked for Eastern Shore Motors which was later taken over by the Golden Fleece Company. He eventually ran his own service station at Lindisfarne for 15 years and also established a tyre company. He was state president of the Australian Automobile Chamber of Commerce from 1971 to 1974 and also served a term as national president.

== Politics ==
Goodluck was elected warden of the Clarence Municipality in 1972. He rose to public prominence in 1975 following the Tasman Bridge disaster, which saw Clarence cut off from central Hobart, and was "active in agitating on behalf of the Eastern Shore community which had been isolated by the disaster".

Goodluck was invited to the join the Liberal Party and was elected to the House of Representatives at the 1975 federal election, defeating long-term incumbent Australian Labor Party MP Ray Sherry in the seat of Franklin. The election results saw the Liberal Party win all five House seats in Tasmania following a backlash against the Whitlam government.

Despite Franklin's reputation as a safe Labor seat at state level, Goodluck was re-elected to parliament on six occasions. He remained a backbencher throughout his parliamentary service and crossed the floor to vote against the Liberals on a number occasions. According to the Canberra Times, he "astutely selected a number of populist issues on which to rebel against the party line", including opposing the Fraser government's abolition of pensioner funeral benefits and failure to index pensions. His campaign materials did not mention the Liberal Party, and described himself as "the little grub battl[ing] for the underdog" and "the little Aussie battler".

Goodluck announced his retirement due to ill health in December 1992, following two mild strokes. He retired at the 1993 federal election.

In 1996 he returned to politics as an independent member of the Tasmanian House of Assembly for the state seat of Franklin; he retired in 1998.

== Personal life and honours ==
Goodluck had five daughters with his wife Cynthia.

In 2000 Bruce Goodluck was appointed a Member of the Order of Australia (AM). In 2001 he was awarded the Centenary Medal.

He died at the age of 83 on 24 October 2016.

Parliament of Australia
Preceded by Ray Sherry	Member for Franklin; 1975–1993	Succeeded by Harry Quick
