= Division of Franklin =

Australian federal electoral division

Coordinates: 43.224°S 146.711°E

Franklin Australian House of Representatives Division
- Interactive map of boundaries since the 2019 federal election
- Created: 1903
- MP: Julie Collins
- Party: Labor
- Namesake: Sir John Franklin
- Electors: 80,331 (2022)
- Area: 10,009 km^{2} (3,864.5 sq mi)
- Demographic: Outer metropolitan
- State electorate: Franklin
Electorates around Franklin:
Braddon	Clark	Lyons
Braddon	Franklin	Tasman Sea
Southern Ocean	Southern Ocean	Southern Ocean

The Division of Franklin is an Australian electoral division in Tasmania.

Until 2026, the division was the southernmost in Australia, located in southern Tasmania around the state capital, Hobart. As a result of the redistribution in 2026, Franklin's boundaries would be changed to cede the Huon Valley and gain much of the Tasmanian south-east coast. The division would then cover the entire local government areas of Brighton, Clarence, Sorell, Tasman and Glamorgan Spring Bay. These changes would take effect at the next general election.

== Geography ==
Since 1984, federal electoral division boundaries in Australia have been determined at redistributions by a redistribution committee appointed by the Australian Electoral Commission. Redistributions occur for the boundaries of divisions in a particular state, and they occur every seven years, or sooner if a state's representation entitlement changes or when divisions of a state are malapportioned.

Prior to 1903, the entire state of Tasmania was covered by a single Division of Tasmania. In 1903, the division was split into five divisions, with one of them being Franklin. At the time, Franklin covered much of the southern half of Tasmania except Hobart, which was covered by a separate Division of Denison.

In 1977, the division lost all areas east of the River Derwent, and became solely located west of the River Derwent. In 1992, the division re-gained areas east of the River Derwent and became non-contiguous (geographically separated) over the river. On land, the two parts of the division were separated by the Division of Denison (later Division of Clark) based around central Hobart. By 2026, Franklin remained the only non-contiguous federal division in Australia (except those incorporating islands or external territories).

As of the 2025 election (prior to the 2026 redistribution), slightly more than half of its electors (around 55%) were located on the eastern shore of the River Derwent, comprising most of the City of Clarence. The remaining electors in the division were drawn from the southern parts of the Kingborough Council such as Kingston and Blackmans Bay, generally south of the Huon Highway and including Bruny Island, and the entire Huon Valley Council. The division also included Macquarie Island and the southern parts of the Tasmanian Wilderness World Heritage Area, neither of which have permanent populations.

In the 2026 redistribution, Franklin lost all areas west of the River Derwent to the Division of Clark, while gaining much of the east coast from the Division of Lyons. This allowed the issue of non-contiguity to finally be resolved. However, it also meant that Franklin would no longer be the southernmost federal division in Australia.

With effect at the next general election, the division will cover the entire local government areas of Brighton, Clarence, Sorell, Tasman and Glamorgan Spring Bay.

== History ==
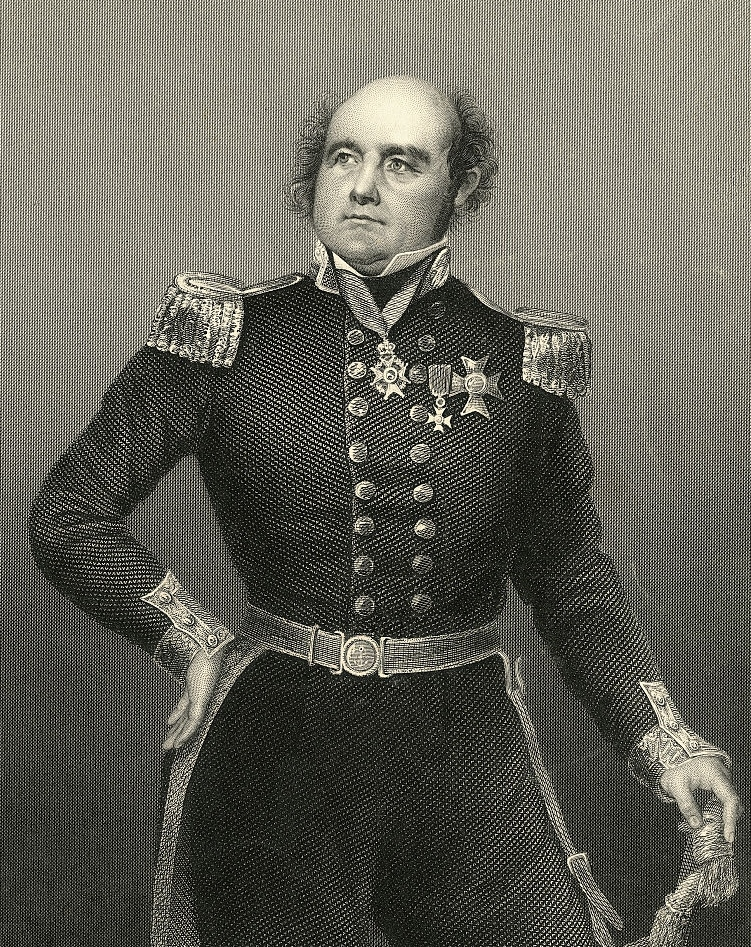
Sir John Franklin, the division's namesake

The division was one of the five established when the former Division of Tasmania was redistributed on 2 October 1903 and is named for Sir John Franklin, the polar explorer who was Lt Governor of Van Diemen's Land 1843-46.

The Division of Franklin has always been a reasonably marginal seat, changing hands between the Australian Labor Party and the Liberal Party and its predecessors. However, after 14 years of representation by former Labor and independent member Harry Quick, the seat of Franklin was considered safe Labor with Franklin one of very few electorates to record a swing to Labor at the 2010 election. Franklin also has a strong history of voting for strong candidates rather than for a particular party.

In 2005, sitting Labor member Harry Quick announced that he would retire at the 2007 election. When Labor preselected union official Kevin Harkins as a replacement, Quick, seeing him as unsuitable, appeared to endorse the Liberal candidate, Vanessa Goodwin, which was partly responsible for his expulsion from the Labor party. Harkins was eventually dropped as a candidate, and the Labor Party state secretary Julie Collins was installed as the ALP candidate.

Collins won the seat of Franklin at the 2007 election despite Labor suffering a 3.11% swing against on two party preferred results and 5.03% swing against in general results. Liberal candidate Vanessa Goodwin recorded a swing towards the party while the Australian Greens a swing towards the party similar to that of the Liberals.

Under the Australian Electoral Commission redistribution plans released in early 2026, it was proposed that Franklin cede the Huon Valley and gain much of the Tasmanian south-east coast, with the usual public consultation undertaken. In July 2026, it was announced that the Commission was additionally proposing to rename Franklin to Tongerlongeter, named after Aboriginal Tasmanian Tongerlongeter. However, noting that the name change proposal would require further consultation and consideration, the name change proposal was dropped the following month. The redistribution (without the name change) was finalised on 8 October later that year.

== Members ==
Image	Member	Party	Term	Notes
	William McWilliams (1856–1929)	Revenue Tariff	16 December 1903 – 1906	Previously held the Tasmanian House of Assembly seat of Ringarooma. Served as leader of the Country Party from 1920 to 1921. Lost seat
	William McWilliams (1856–1929)	Anti-Socialist	1906 – 26 May 1909	Previously held the Tasmanian House of Assembly seat of Ringarooma. Served as leader of the Country Party from 1920 to 1921. Lost seat
	William McWilliams (1856–1929)	Liberal	26 May 1909 – 17 February 1917	Previously held the Tasmanian House of Assembly seat of Ringarooma. Served as leader of the Country Party from 1920 to 1921. Lost seat
	William McWilliams (1856–1929)	Nationalist	17 February 1917 – 22 January 1920	Previously held the Tasmanian House of Assembly seat of Ringarooma. Served as leader of the Country Party from 1920 to 1921. Lost seat
	William McWilliams (1856–1929)	Country	22 January 1920 – 16 December 1922	Previously held the Tasmanian House of Assembly seat of Ringarooma. Served as leader of the Country Party from 1920 to 1921. Lost seat
	Alfred Seabrook (1867–1939)	Nationalist	16 December 1922 – 17 November 1928	Lost seat. Later elected to the Tasmanian House of Assembly seat of Franklin in 1931
	William McWilliams (1856–1929)	Independent	17 November 1928 – 22 October 1929	Died in office
	Charles Frost (1882–1964)	Labor	14 December 1929 – 19 December 1931	Lost seat
	Archibald Blacklow (1879–1965)	United Australia	19 December 1931 – 15 September 1934	Lost seat. Later elected to the Tasmanian Legislative Council in 1936
	Charles Frost (1882–1964)	Labor	15 September 1934 – 28 September 1946	Served as minister under Curtin, Forde and Chifley. Lost seat
	Bill Falkinder (1921–1993)	Liberal	28 September 1946 – 31 October 1966	Retired
	Thomas Pearsall (1920–2003)	Liberal	26 November 1966 – 25 October 1969	Previously held the Tasmanian House of Assembly seat of Franklin. Lost seat
	Ray Sherry (1924–1989)	Labor	25 October 1969 – 13 December 1975	Lost seat. Later elected to the Tasmanian House of Assembly seat of Franklin in 1976
	Bruce Goodluck (1933–2016)	Liberal	13 December 1975 – 8 February 1993	Retired. Later elected to the Tasmanian House of Assembly seat of Franklin in 1996
	Harry Quick (1941–2024)	Labor	13 March 1993 – 20 August 2007	Retired
	Harry Quick (1941–2024)	Independent	20 August 2007 – 17 October 2007	Retired
	Julie Collins (1971–)	Labor	24 November 2007 – present	Served as minister under Gillard and Rudd. Incumbent. Currently a minister under Albanese

== Election results ==
2025 Australian federal election: Franklin
Party	Candidate	Votes	%	±%
Labor	Julie Collins	29,842	39.03	+2.34
Independent	Peter George	16,586	21.69	+21.69
Liberal	Josh Garvin	14,403	18.84	−7.89
Greens	Owen Fitzgerald (withdrew)	8,016	10.48	−6.88
Independent	Brendan Blomeley	3,822	5.00	+5.00
One Nation	Stefan Popescu	3,793	4.96	+2.11
Total formal votes		76,462	97.03	+1.96
Informal votes		2,340	2.97	−1.96
Turnout		78,802	94.16	+0.75
Notional two-party-preferred count
Labor	Julie Collins	53,096	69.44	+5.74
Liberal	Josh Garvin	23,366	30.56	−5.74
Two-candidate-preferred result
Labor	Julie Collins	44,179	57.78	−5.92
Independent	Peter George	32,283	42.22	+42.22
Labor hold				
