= Kevin Lyons (judge) =

Australian judge

Kevin Lyons KC

Judge of the Supreme Court of Victoria
- Incumbent
- Assumed office 22 May 2018
- Preceded by: Peter Vickery

Personal details
- Born: Tasmania
- Relations: Kevin Lyons Sr. (father); Libby Lyons (sister); Brendan Lyons (uncle); Joseph Lyons (grandfather); Enid Lyons (grandmother)
- Education: Xavier College
- Alma mater: University of Melbourne

Kevin Joseph Aloysius Lyons KC is an Australian judge and former barrister who has served on the Supreme Court of Victoria since May 2018, sitting in the Trial Division.

== Early life ==
Lyons was born in Tasmania. He is the son of politician Kevin Lyons Sr., and the grandson of Prime Minister Joseph Lyons and his wife Enid. He moved to Melbourne at the age of five and completed his schooling at Xavier College. He subsequently studied arts and law at the University of Melbourne, majoring in classics.

== Lawyer ==
Lyons served his articles of clerkship with Galbally & O'Brien. He worked as a solicitor at the firm for three years, then from 1993 as an associate to Justice David Harper. He was admitted to the bar in 1995, reading with Kim Hargrave. Lyons subsequently became a "leading commercial barrister". He served on the board of the Victoria Law Foundation and on the ethics committee of the Victorian Bar. He was appointed Queen's Counsel in 2012.

== Judge ==
Lyons was appointed to the Supreme Court of Victoria on 22 May 2018, replacing Peter Vickery.

== See also ==
- List of Judges of the Supreme Court of Victoria
