= Libby Lyons =

Australian former public servant

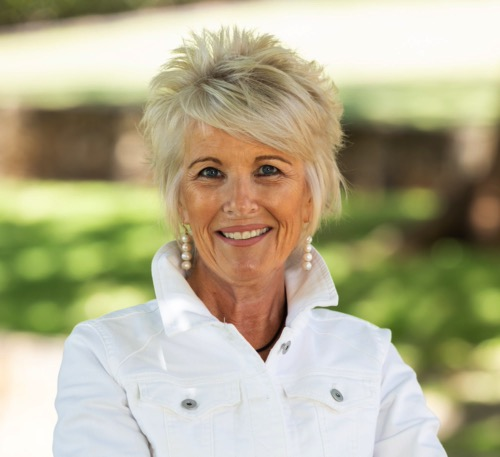
Lyons in 2023

Libby Lyons is an Australian former public servant who served as the director of the Australian Government's Workplace Gender Equality Agency. She was appointed director in October 2015 and completed her term in April 2021. As director, Lyons played a key role in promoting and improving gender equality in Australian workplaces. She has also been a member of and chaired many boards in several sectors.

== Early life and education ==
Lyons was born in Tasmania and grew up in Melbourne.

== Career ==
Lyons has worked in senior management roles across the corporate and government sectors in the energy, resources and telecommunications industries.

In 2014, she moved to Western Australia, and headed Corporate Affairs for BHP's Olympic Dam project. She held senior roles at Atlas Iron, CITIC Pacific Mining, Alcoa of Australia, and Western Power. She was also corporate relations manager at Telstra and acting chair and non-executive director of Perth-based Reclaim Industries.

In October 2015 Lyons was appointed director of the Workplace Gender Equality Agency. In this position, she advocated to close the gender pay gap and break down occupational gender segregation in Australia. She is a strong advocate for ensuring flexible work practices are normalised for men, as well as women.

In November 2016, Lyons presented Australia's gender equality scorecard, based on the Agency's latest data from employers, at the National Press Club in Canberra. In the address, Lyons called on Australian employers to take urgent action to address the gender pay gap. She completed her term as director of the agency in April 2021.

== Other roles ==
Lyons has chaired a number of not-for-profits. She took on the position of executive chairman for Kalparrin, a Perth-based charity that supports families of children with special needs, in June 2013. She was also on the board of directors and the chair of SIDS and Kids WA.

In 2020, Lyons became the inaugural chair of Science in Australia Gender Equity (SAGE), a not-for-profit that works with Australian higher education and research institutions to address systemic barriers to gender equity, diversity and inclusion.

Following the conclusion of her term as director of the Workplace Gender Equality Agency, Lyons was appointed as the inaugural chair of the Aged Care Workforce Industry Council. In February 2023, Lyons announced her resignation from the role.

In August 2021, she was appointed WA Chapter chair of Chief Executive Women, for a term of two years.

Lyons was appointed Adjunct-Professor at Australian Catholic University in 2021.

In 2021 Lyons was appointed to the Strategic Council at Perth-based consultancy firm ReGen Strategic.

== Politics ==
Lyons stood for Liberal Party preselection prior to the 2008 Western Australian state election, losing to Bill Marmion in the seat of Nedlands. She also contested preselection for the House of Representatives prior to the 2010 federal election, losing to incumbent Tangney MP Dennis Jensen.

In 2021, Lyons ruled herself out of Liberal preselection for the federal seat of Pearce prior to the 2022 federal election.

== Recognition ==
In both 2019 and 2018, Lyons was named in Apolitical's Gender Equality Top 100.

Lyons featured in the book 200 Women, and was awarded Woman of the Decade for Gender Policy by the Women Economic Forum in 2019.

Lyons was named Woman of the Decade for Gender Equality by the World Economic Forum in 2019.

In 2022, Lyons was awarded an Honorary Doctor of Letters by Curtin University for "distinguished service to the social sciences through outstanding and influential advocacy for gender equality in the workplace, with impacts in Australia and internationally".

In 2024, she was inducted into the WA Women's Hall of Fame in the business category.

== Family ==
Lyons comes from one of the prominent political families of Australia. She is the granddaughter of former Australian Prime Minister Joseph Lyons and Dame Enid Lyons who was the first woman elected to Australia's House of Representatives, and the first woman appointed to the federal cabinet. Her father was Deputy Premier of Tasmania Kevin Lyons and her brother is Kevin Lyons QC, Judge of the Supreme Court of Victoria.

She married criminal lawyer Michael Jones, who died in 2010.

She later married George Bowen.
