= Joseph Lyons =

Prime Minister of Australia from 1932 to 1939

The Right Honourable Joseph Lyons CH
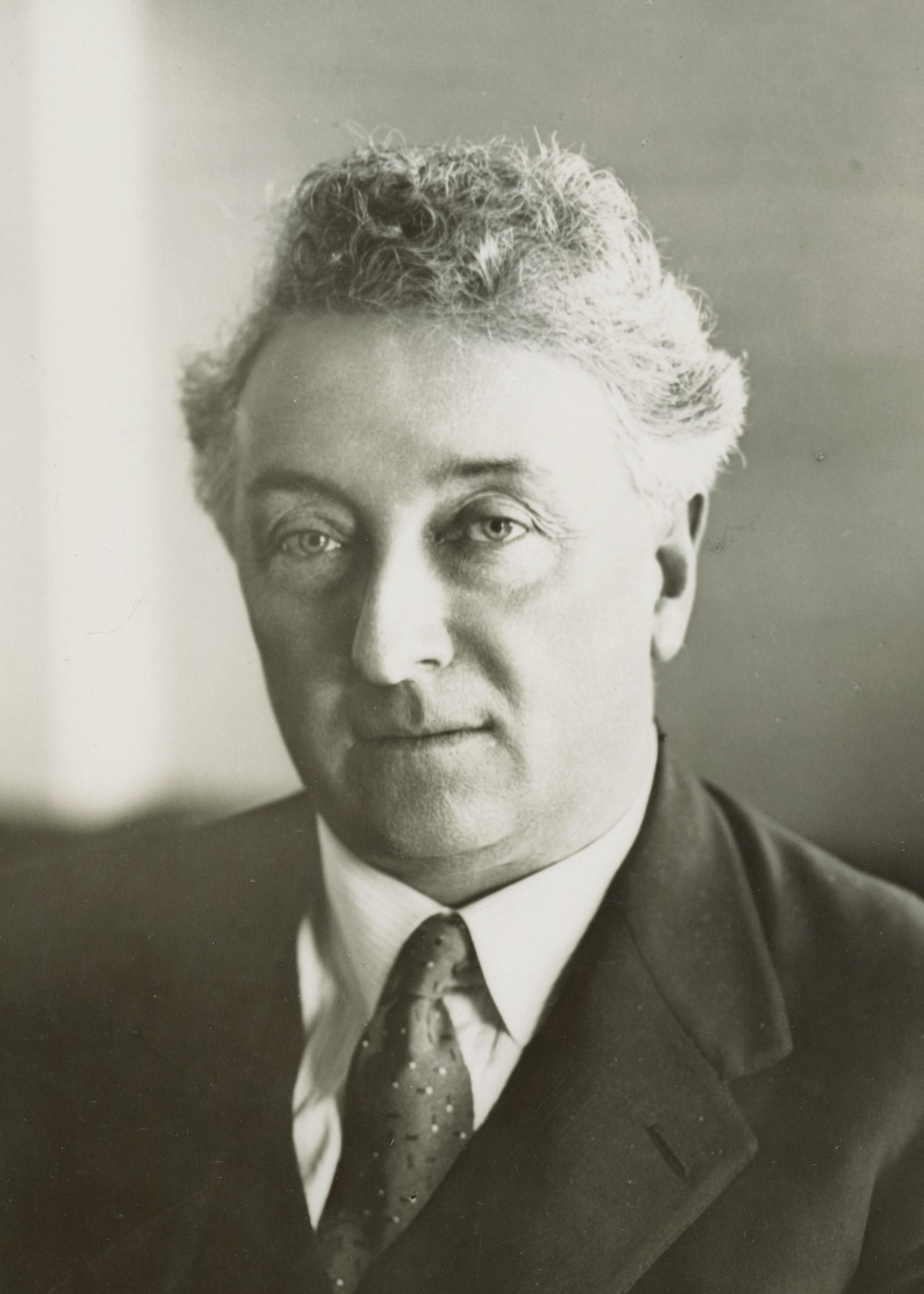
- Official portrait c. 1932

10th Prime Minister of Australia
- In office 6 January 1932 – 7 April 1939
- Monarchs: George V Edward VIII; George VI
- Governors-General: Sir Isaac Isaacs; Lord Gowrie
- Deputy: John Latham; Earle Page
- Preceded by: James Scullin
- Succeeded by: Earle Page

Leader of the Opposition
- In office 7 May 1931 – 6 January 1932
- Prime Minister: James Scullin
- Deputy: John Latham
- Preceded by: John Latham
- Succeeded by: James Scullin

26th Premier of Tasmania
- In office 25 October 1923 – 15 June 1928
- Governor: Sir James O'Grady
- Preceded by: Sir Walter Lee
- Succeeded by: Sir John McPhee
Party leadership positions
Leader of the United Australia Party Elections: 1931, 1934, 1937
In office 7 May 1931 – 7 April 1939
Deputy	John Latham; Robert Menzies
Preceded by	Position Established
Succeeded by	Robert Menzies
Leader of the Labor Party in Tasmania Elections: 1919, 1922, 1925, 1928
In office 2 November 1916 – 16 September 1929
Preceded by	John Earle
Succeeded by	Albert Ogilvie
Federal cabinet posts
Treasurer of Australia
In office 6 January 1932 – 2 October 1935
Prime Minister	Himself
Preceded by	Ted Theodore
Succeeded by	Richard Casey
Minister for Commerce
In office 6 January 1932 – 2 October 1935
Prime Minister	Himself
Preceded by	Charles Hawker
Succeeded by	Frederick Stewart
Postmaster-General
In office 22 October 1929 – 4 February 1931
Prime Minister	James Scullin
Preceded by	William Gibson
Succeeded by	Albert Green
Minister for Works and Railways
In office 22 October 1929 – 4 February 1931
Prime Minister	James Scullin
Preceded by	William Gibson
Succeeded by	Albert Green
State cabinet posts
Treasurer of Tasmania
In office 25 October 1923 – 15 June 1928
Premier	Himself
Preceded by	Walter Lee
Succeeded by	John McPhee
In office 6 April 1914 – 15 April 1916
Premier	John Earle
Preceded by	Herbert Payne
Succeeded by	Elliott Lewis
Minister for Education
In office 6 April 1914 – 15 April 1916
Premier	John Earle
Preceded by	Albert Solomon
Succeeded by	Walter Lee
Constituencies
Member of the Australian House of Representatives
In office 12 October 1929 – 7 April 1939
Preceded by	Llewellyn Atkinson
Succeeded by	Lancelot Spurr
Constituency	Wilmot
Member of the Tasmanian House of Assembly
In office 30 April 1909 – 13 September 1929
Constituency	Wilmot
Preceded by	New division
Succeeded by	William Shoobridge

Personal details
- Born: Joseph Aloysius Lyons; 15 September 1879 Stanley, Colony of Tasmania
- Died: 7 April 1939 (aged 59) Sydney, New South Wales, Australia
- Cause of death: Heart attack
- Resting place: Mersey Vale Memorial Park, Quoiba
- Party: Labor (to 1931); Independent (1931); UAP (after 1931)
- Spouse: Enid Burnell (m. 1917)
- Relations: Libby Lyons (granddaughter); Kevin Lyons Jr. (grandson)
- Children: 12; including Kevin and Brendan
- Education: Hobart Teachers' College
- Occupation: Politician; schoolteacher

Joseph Aloysius Lyons (15 September 1879 – 7 April 1939) was the tenth prime minister of Australia, serving from 1932 until his death in 1939. He held office as the inaugural leader of the United Australia Party (UAP), having previously led the Tasmanian branch of the Australian Labor Party (ALP) before the Australian Labor Party split of 1931. He served as the 26th premier of Tasmania from 1923 to 1928.

Lyons was born in Stanley, Tasmania, and before entering politics worked as a schoolteacher. He was active in the Labor Party from a young age and won election to the Tasmanian House of Assembly in 1909. He was Treasurer of Tasmania (1914–1916) under John Earle, before replacing Earle as party leader in 1916. After two elections that ended in hung parliaments, Lyons was appointed premier in 1923 at the head of a minority government. He pursued moderate reforms and successfully negotiated a constitutional crisis over the powers of the Legislative Council. At the 1925 election he led Labor to its first majority government in Tasmania, but the party lost office three years later.

In 1929, Lyons resigned from state parliament to enter federal politics, winning the seat of Wilmot in Labor's landslide victory at the 1929 election. He was immediately appointed to cabinet by the new prime minister James Scullin, becoming Postmaster-General of Australia and Minister for Works and Railways. In 1930, he was acting treasurer while Scullin was overseas, and came into conflict with the Labor caucus over the government's response to the Great Depression; he preferred orthodox financial policies. In early 1931, Lyons and his followers left Labor to sit as independents. His exact motivations for leaving the party have been subject to debate. A few months later his group merged with other opposition parties to form the United Australia Party; he was elected Leader of the Opposition.

Lyons led the UAP to a landslide victory at the 1931 election. Nicknamed "Honest Joe", he was known as a masterful political campaigner and became popular with the general public. His personal popularity was a major factor in the government's re-election in 1934 and 1937; he was the first prime minister to win three federal elections. The UAP initially governed alone but after 1934 formed a coalition with the Country Party. Lyons was his own treasurer until 1935 and oversaw Australia's recovery from the Great Depression. He faced a number of foreign-policy challenges, but accelerated Australia's transition towards an independent foreign policy. In the lead-up to World War II his government pursued a policy of appeasement and rearmament.

Lyons died of a heart attack in April 1939, becoming the first Australian prime minister to die in office. He is the only prime minister from Tasmania and one of two state premiers who have become prime minister, along with George Reid. A few years after his death, his widow Enid Lyons became the first woman elected to the House of Representatives.

== Early life ==
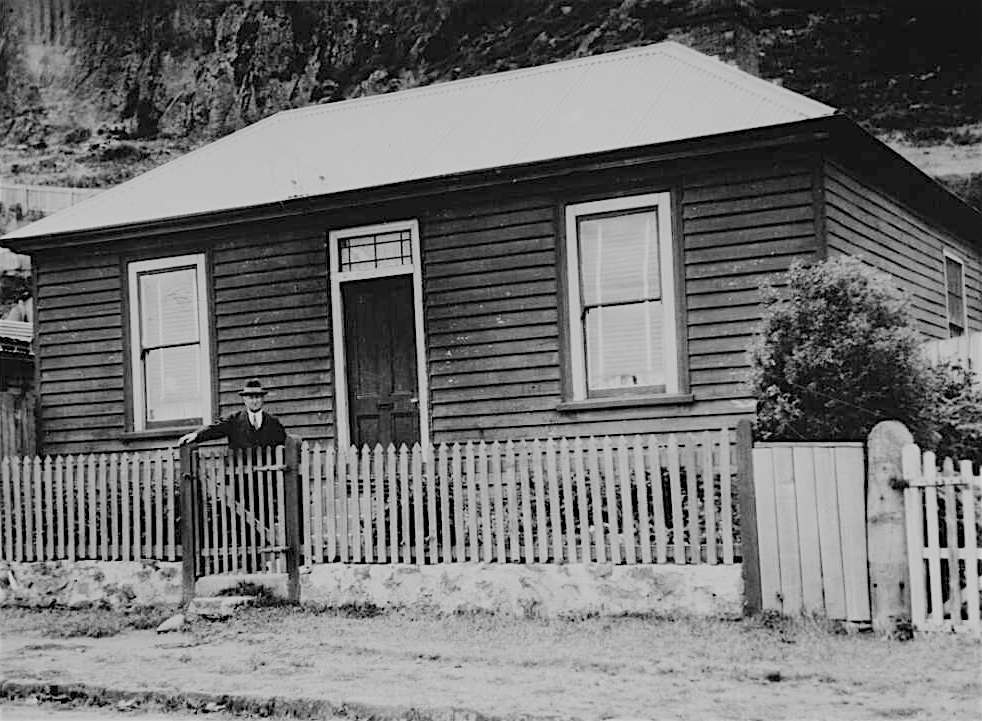
Lyons in 1935 standing outside his birthplace and childhood home in Stanley, Tasmania

=== Birth and family background ===
Lyons was born in Stanley, Tasmania, on 15 September 1879. He was the fifth of eight children born to Ellen (née Carroll) and Michael Henry Lyons, both of Irish descent. His mother was born in County Kildare and arrived in Australia in 1857, aged eleven, while his father was born in Tasmania to immigrants from County Galway. Lyons was the first prime minister to have an Australian-born parent. His paternal grandfather, Michael Lyons Sr., had arrived in Tasmania in 1843 with his wife and an infant daughter. Initially an indentured labourer, he became a tenant farmer after completing his term of service, and eventually saved enough to purchase land at Stanley, on the north-west coast. He had a reputation as a shrewd businessman, frequently buying and selling tracts of land and also dabbling in the hotel trade for a period. His sons followed him into farming, and the Lyons family was prominent in the small local community.

=== Childhood ===
When Lyons was four years old, his father moved the family from Stanley to Ulverstone, where he opened a combined bakery and butcher's shop. In 1887, he lost the family's savings betting on the Melbourne Cup, driving them into poverty. He had to sell the shop and resort to working as an unskilled labourer; his oldest children took part-time jobs to support the family. Lyons began working at the age of nine, as a printer's messenger boy. By the age of twelve, he was "cutting scrub" (clearing land) for local farmers. Lyons had begun his education at the Ulverstone State School in 1885, before switching to the local Catholic school in 1887. His early years of schooling were interrupted by his family's financial difficulties, and his attendance was sometimes irregular, though this was not uncommon in small rural schools at the time. In 1891, he moved back to Stanley to live with his aunts, Etty and Mary Carroll, and was enrolled at the Stanley State School.

=== Teaching career ===
In 1895, aged fifteen, Lyons began working as a pupil-teacher under the monitorial system. This allowed him to continue his own education while being paid to teach younger students, and eventually qualify as a full-time teacher himself. Apart from a three-month stint as a relief teacher at Irishtown, he remained at Stanley until early 1901, when he was given charge of two small "half-time" schools on the east coast, Apslawn and Apsley Meadows. During that period, he lived at "Apsley House", the family estate of Sir William Lyne, Premier of New South Wales. In March 1902, Lyons transferred to the Midlands, taking charge of the schools at Conara and Llewellyn. He was transferred again in July 1905 to Tullah, then a few months later to Smithton, and then in April 1906 to Pioneer. In 1907, Lyons moved to Hobart to attend the newly opened Hobart Teachers' College for a year. He was then posted to Launceston, teaching at the Glen Dhu and Wellington Square State Schools, as well as briefly acting as headmaster at Perth. He came into conflict with the Department of Education on a number of occasions, often complaining about poor working conditions. His superiors also disapproved of his political activities, which together with his complaints probably contributed to his frequent transfers and failure to win desirable postings.

== State politics ==
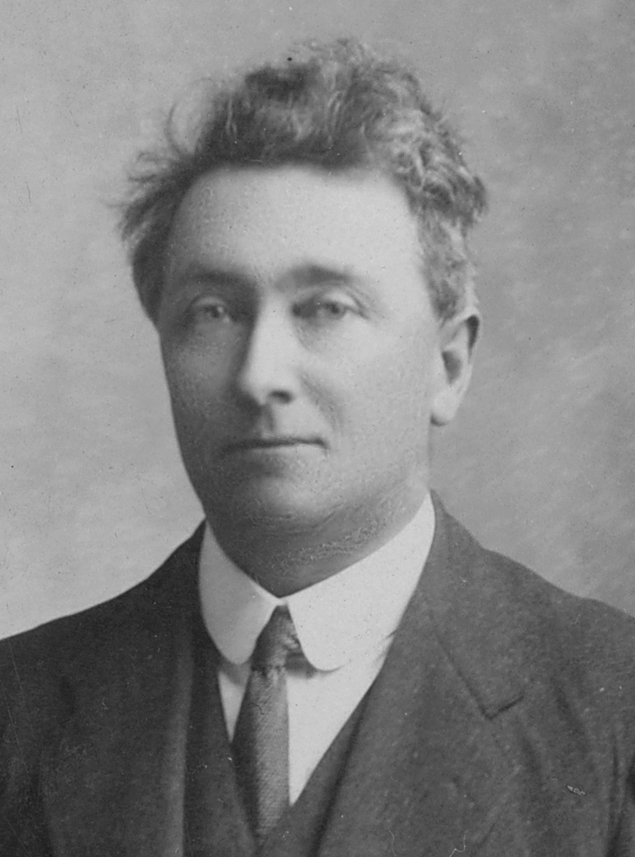
Lyons as a state government minister (c. 1914–16)

Lyons came from a family that was broadly sympathetic to the Australian labour movement, but without any formal political involvement. Though widely read, he did not actively participate in politics until after leaving Stanley. Lyons helped found a branch of the Workers' Political League during his time in Smithton, but was forced to resign his membership due to restrictions on the involvement of public servants in political activities. Those rules were later relaxed, and by 1908 he was spending most of his free time campaigning for the Labor Party; he had a reputation as a first-rate orator. Lyons was elected to the Tasmanian House of Assembly at the 1909 state election, standing in the six-member Division of Wilmot. This required him to resign from the Education Department and give up his teaching career, which reduced his annual salary from £125 to £100. (Note: Tasmanian MPs did not get a pay rise until 1913, when their salary doubled to £200. Lyons was among those who argued for the amount to be increased, on the grounds that their remuneration was insufficient to cover the larger electorates introduced in 1909.) He was comfortably re-elected in 1912, although he was attacked with a horsewhip during one of his campaign speeches. The son of one of his political opponents was convicted of assault, and the incident received widespread media attention.

Labor came to power in Tasmania in 1914, after the existing Liberal government of Albert Solomon was defeated on a confidence motion. The new premier was John Earle, who had previously held office for one week in October 1909. In the new government, Lyons was made Treasurer, Minister for Education, and Minister for Railways; it was common for ministers to hold more than one portfolio. He was somewhat inexperienced with economic matters, and often turned to his friend and colleague Lyndhurst Giblin for advice; they eventually renewed their relationship at federal level during the 1930s. Less than a month after taking office, Lyons announced that the government was moving its accounts from the Commercial Bank of Tasmania to the Commonwealth Bank, which had only been established a few years earlier. In return he was able to secure a substantial loan and an overdraft of £100,000. The government faced a number of challenges during its two years in office, including a statewide drought, a series of bushfires in early 1915, and labour shortages due to the ongoing war. As Labor was in minority, many of its legislative initiatives were thwarted by the opposition. The party lost the 1916 state election by two seats, despite increasing its share of the vote.

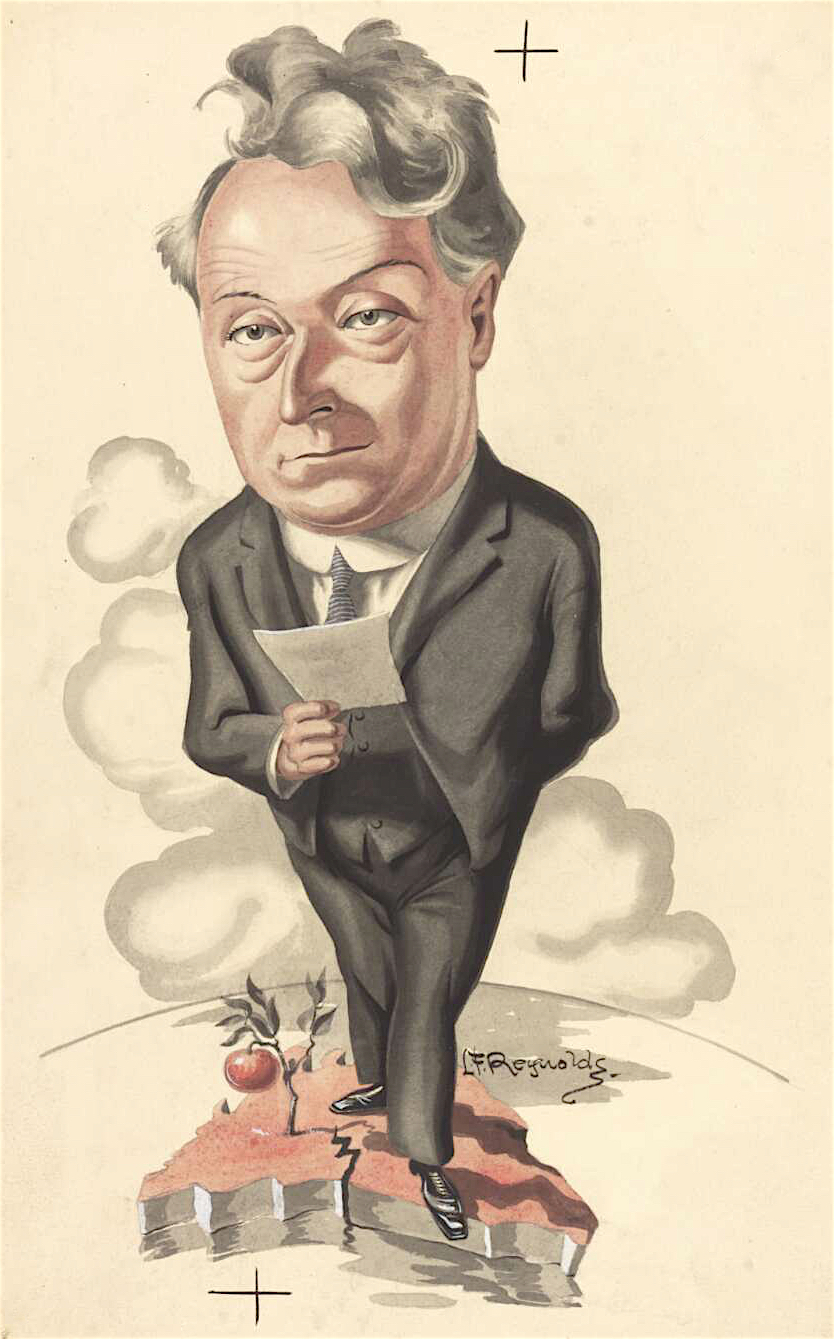
Caricature of Lyons as premier

When the ALP split over conscription during the First World War in 1916, Earle, a pro-conscriptionist, followed Prime Minister Billy Hughes out of the Labor party. Like most Australians of Irish Catholic background, Lyons was an anti-conscriptionist and stayed in the Labor Party, becoming its new leader in Tasmania.

=== Premier of Tasmania ===
Lyons led the Labor opposition in the Tasmanian Parliament until 1923 when he became Premier of Tasmania, leading a minority ALP government. He held office until 1928, also serving as Treasurer during the whole period of his premiership. Lyons's government was cautious and pragmatic, establishing good relations with business and the conservative government in Canberra, but attracting some criticism from unionists within his own party. Labor narrowly lost the 1928 state election to the Nationalist Party.

As premier, Lyons faced a constitutional crisis relating to the powers of the Tasmanian Legislative Council (the parliament's upper house). The Legislative Council had a limited franchise and was occupied mostly by conservative landowners, and was consequently opposed to much of the government's platform. Historically, it had claimed for itself the power to amend money bills, despite having no express constitutional authority to do so. In November 1924, the council returned the government's budget to the Legislative Assembly with a series of proposed reductions in spending. Lyons chose to ignore the amendments, instead sending the bill directly to the Administrator, Herbert Nicholls, who approved it. In 1926, the government amended the state constitution to codify the Legislative Council's powers over money bills, bringing them into line with the other states.

On 15 July 1926, Lyons suffered severe leg injuries when his car—driven by a chauffeur—collided with a goods train near Perth. He came close to death, and stood down from public duties for four months to recover; Allan Guy was acting premier in his absence. Michael O'Keefe, the Speaker of the Tasmanian House of Assembly, was also a passenger in the car, and lingered for several months before dying of his injuries.

== Federal politics ==
At the 1929 Australian federal election Lyons ran for the federal seat of Wilmot, covering the same territory as his state seat. He was swept into office in Labor's landslide victory under James Scullin. He was appointed Postmaster-General and Minister for Works and Railways.

When the Great Depression struck in 1930, the Scullin government split over its response. Lyons became the leading advocate within the government of orthodox finance and deflationary economic policies, and an opponent of the inflationary, proto-Keynesian policies of Treasurer Ted Theodore. Theodore was forced to resign over accusations of corruption in June 1930, and Scullin took over the Treasury portfolio in addition to the prime ministership. Lyons was acting Treasurer from August 1930 to January 1931, whilst Scullin was in Britain for the Imperial Conference. Lyons announced his plan for recovery in October 1930, insisting on the need to maintain a balanced budget and cut public spending and salaries, although also advising lower interest rates and the provision of greater credit for industry.

His conservative economic approach won him support among business, but angered many in the Labor caucus, who wanted to expand the deficit to stimulate the economy, and were horrified at the prospect of cuts in salaries and government spending. Alienated by their attacks, Lyons began to consider suggestions from a group of his new business supporters, including influential members of the Melbourne Establishment, that he leave the government to take over the leadership of the conservative opposition.

== Resignation from the Labor Party ==
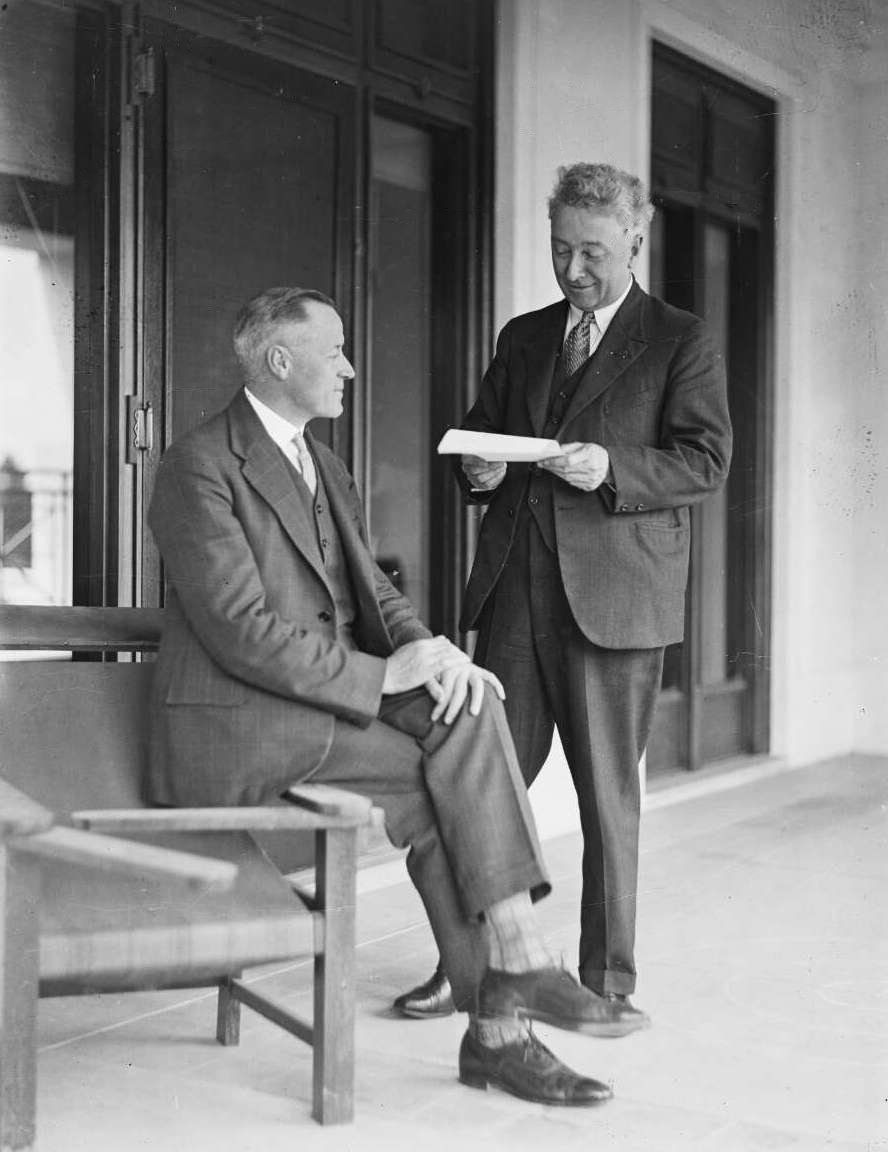
Lyons with John Latham, the deputy UAP leader

When Scullin returned in January 1931, he reappointed Theodore (as it had become clear Theodore would not be charged with corruption) to the Cabinet as Treasurer, which Lyons took as a rejection of his own policies. Lyons immediately resigned from the Cabinet, and then in mid–March from the Labor Party. Accompanied by another senior minister in the Scullin government, James Fenton, and four other right-wing Labor MPs, he crossed the floor to sit on the opposition benches. Soon afterward, Lyons and his supporters joined with the opposition Nationalist Party and the Australian Party, a small party led by Billy Hughes, to form a new party, the United Australia Party (UAP).

Although the UAP was essentially an enlarged Nationalist Party, Lyons was chosen as leader of the party. He thus became Leader of the Opposition, with former Nationalist leader John Latham as his deputy. The UAP realised that Lyons, an affable family man with the common touch, was a far more electorally appealing figure than the aloof Latham. Additionally, his Labor background and his Catholicism would allow him to win traditional Labor constituencies (working-class voters and Irish Catholics) over to what was essentially an upper- and middle-class conservative party. Lyons became, as noted by one study, “leader of the conservative forces of Australia.”

In March, at about the same time as Lyons led his group of defectors from the right of the Labor Party across the floor, five left-wing NSW Labor MPs, supporters of New South Wales Premier Jack Lang, also split from the official Labor Party over the government's economic policies (for Lyons official Labor had been too radical, for the Langites they were not radical enough), forming a "Lang Labor" group on the cross-benches and costing the government its majority in the House of Representatives. Late in the year, the Langite MPs supported a UAP motion of no confidence and brought the government down, forcing an early election.

== Prime minister ==
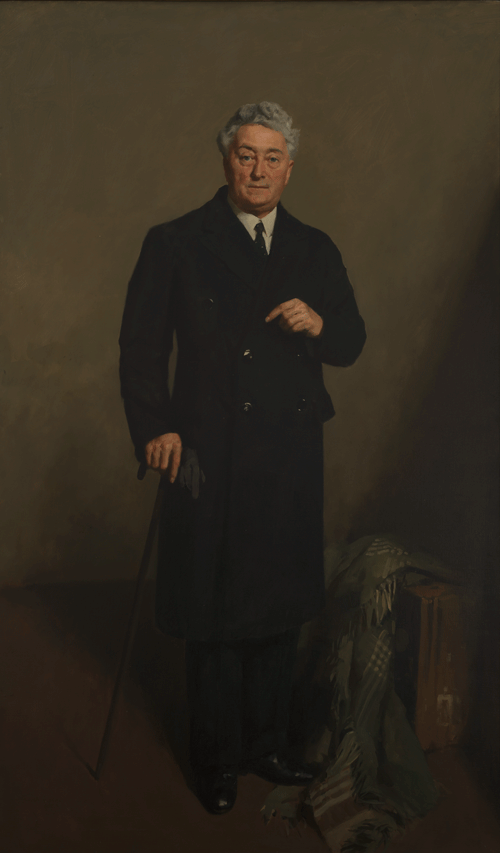
Parliament House portrait of Lyons by William Beckwith McInnes, 1936

=== Elections and government formation ===
At the 1931 election Lyons and the UAP offered stable, orthodox financial policies in response to what they branded as Scullin's poor stewardship of the economy. While Labor remained split between the official party and the Langites, the UAP projected an image of putting national unity above class conflict. The result was a huge victory for the UAP, which took 34 seats against 18 seats for the two wings of the Labor Party combined. Lyons would lead the new conservative administration for the next seven years.

At the outset, the UAP did not renew the traditional non-Labor Coalition with the Country Party, then led by Sir Earle Page. While the two parties ran separate House campaigns, they presented a joint ticket for the Senate. The massive swing to the UAP left it only four seats short of a majority in its own right. The five MPs elected for the Emergency Committee of South Australia, which stood for the UAP and Country Party in South Australia, joined the UAP party room, giving the UAP a bare majority of two seats. While Lyons was still willing to take the Country Party into his government (which would have commanded over 70 percent of the seats), negotiations stalled, and Lyons decided to govern alone. The new government was sworn in January 1932. Lyons became the third former federal or state Labor leader (after Hughes and Joseph Cook) to become a non-Labor Prime Minister.

After the UAP suffered an eight-seat swing in the 1934 election, Lyons was forced to invite the Country Party into his government in a full coalition, with Earle Page as Deputy Prime Minister. The government won a third term at the 1937 election, with 44 of 74 seats and 50.6 percent of the two-party-preferred vote against a reunited Labor Party led by John Curtin.

While campaigning, Lyons made extensive use of the new technologies of radio, film, and air travel. He held frequent press conferences and personally briefed journalists, editors, and newspaper proprietors to gain favourable publicity.

=== Domestic policy ===
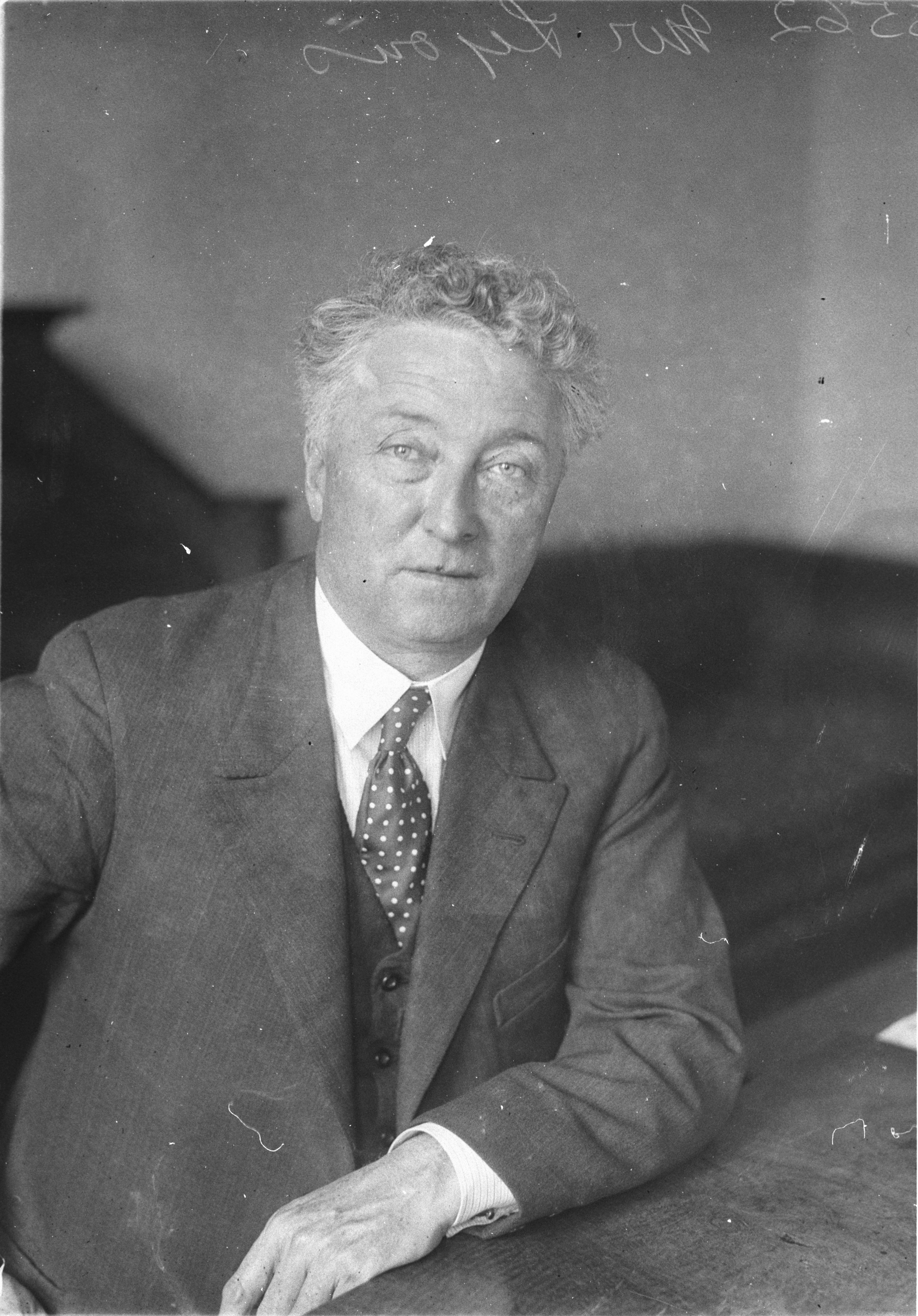
Undated photograph of Lyons as prime minister

Lyons adhered to the principles of "sound finance", opposing inflation and government debt and stressing the importance of balanced budgets and orderly loan repayments. Although he had been state treasurer for seven years, he portrayed himself as a relative outsider to economic policy who would take the advice of experts. Lyons appointed himself Treasurer of Australia, the first non-Labor prime minister to do so and the first incoming prime minister to do so since Andrew Fisher in 1914. He had earlier offered the treasurership to Ben Chifley as an inducement to leave the Labor Party, but Chifley declined. He appointed experienced assistant treasurers, initially Stanley Bruce and later Walter Massy-Greene and Richard Casey, who eventually succeeded as Treasurer in 1935.

The Lyons government's plan for recovery was a reprise of the Premiers' Plan which had split the Labor Party. It called for devaluation of the Australian pound, cuts to public servants' wages, reductions in tariffs, reductions in budget deficits, and greater spending on work-relief programmes. Lyons's first budget in 1932 restricted maternity allowances, cut pensions, and cut public servants' wages. His second budget reversed wage cuts and offered tax cuts, which were followed by further tax cuts in the 1934 budget. By some measures Australia recovered from the Great Depression more rapidly than other similar countries, but the effect of the government's policies have been subject to debate, with some arguing they either slowed or had little effect on Australia's recovery. (Note: The unemployment rate in Australia fell from 29 percent in 1932 to 16 percent in 1935 and 9 percent in 1937. In the U.S., the figure was 21 percent in 1935 and 17 percent in 1937. Between 1929 and 1940, Australian real GDP grew by 16.6 percent, compared with 1.6 percent in the U.S. and 24.6 percent in the United Kingdom. According to Hawkins (2010), "arguably Australia was the first country to emerge from the depression, and Roosevelt asked Lyons how it was done". Carl Boris Schedvin, author of Australia and the Great Depression (1970), considered Lyons an inconsequential figure regardless of policy outcomes, describing him as "an unexceptional treasurer. He possessed what in polite circles was described as a 'good grasp' of financial matters and an ability to present a difficult argument cogently, but he lacked Theodore's incisive clarity. His thinking on financial and economic matters was barren of originality and there is almost nothing one can point to in the Lyons period in the form of new or improved organisation for the administration of the economy.")

In April 1933, Western Australia voted overwhelmingly to secede from the rest of the country. Lyons spent two weeks campaigning for the "No" vote with George Pearce and Tom Brennan. The state's isolation at the time was such that he had to appoint John Latham as acting prime minister for the duration of the trip. Despite the result of vote, the federal government viewed secession as unconstitutional and refused to allow Western Australia to leave the federation. The state's appeal to the British government to intervene was also unsuccessful. In July 1933, Lyons established the Commonwealth Grants Commission to provide impartial advice about the distribution of federal government grants to the states; it remains in existence.

Other legislative accomplishments of the Lyons government include the creation of the Australian Broadcasting Commission (ABC) in 1932 and the Income Tax Assessment Act 1936. The government's landmark national insurance scheme proved politically controversial and was never enacted. Political controversies included the Egon Kisch affair of 1934 and the Dalfram dispute of 1938. In 1937, two simultaneous referendums were held, relating to aviation and the marketing of agricultural products; both failed.

=== Foreign policy ===
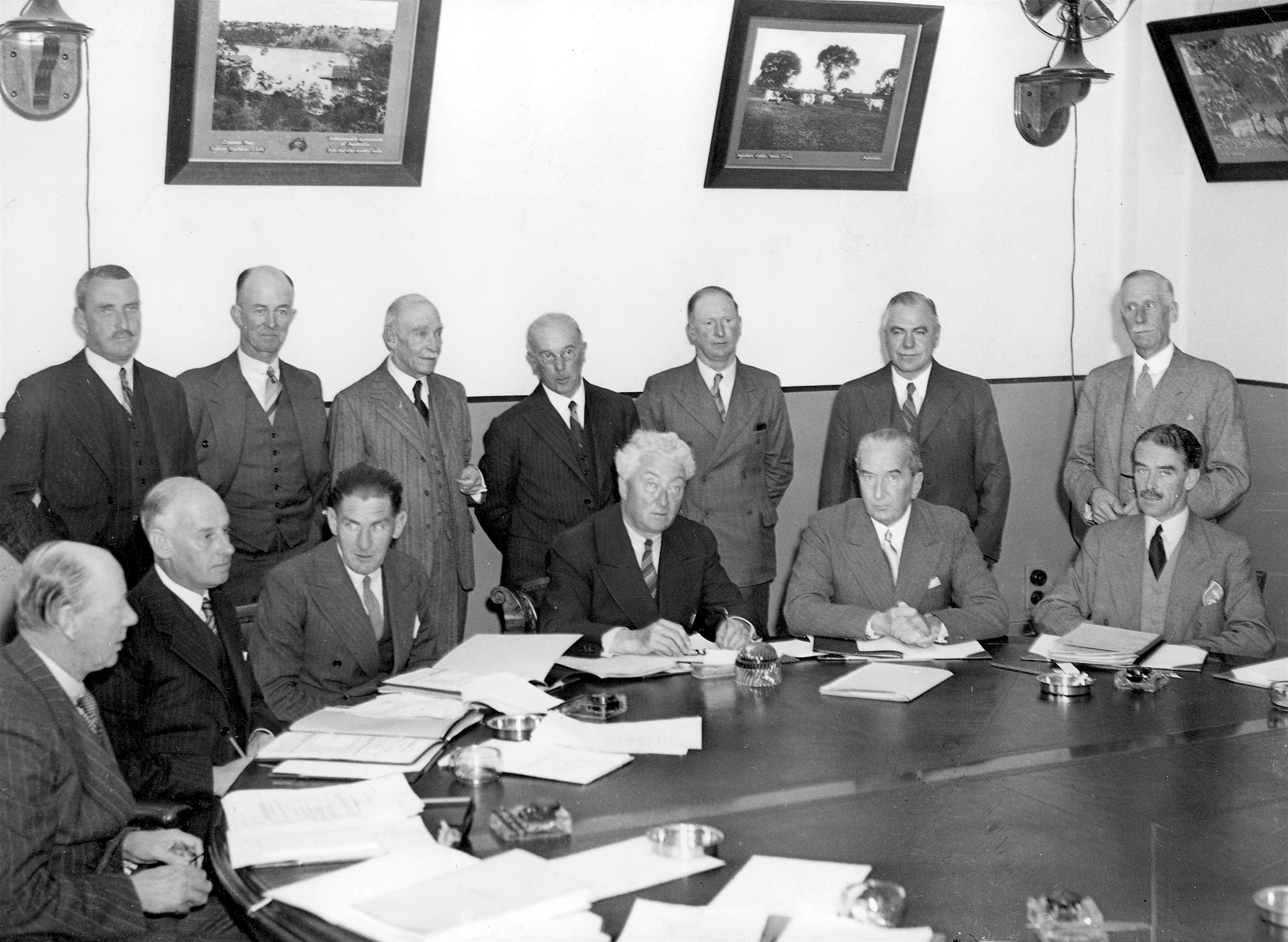
Lyons with the National Defence Council in 1938

Lyons had no previous experience in international relations or diplomacy, but as prime minister took a keen interest in foreign relations and exerted significant influence over the government's foreign policy. His government pursued what has been called a policy of "appeasement and rearmament". Increases in Australia's defence budget in the years before World War II made him "the greatest peace-time rearmer in Australian history", and saw the military rebuilt after severe funding cuts during the Great Depression. Lyons had pacifist leanings and was keen to avoid a repeat of the First World War. These were rooted in his religious convictions, but also influenced by visits to the battlefields of Europe in which he viewed the graves of Australian soldiers. The appeasement aspect of his foreign policy was primarily directed at Italy and Japan, as it was likely that war between those countries and other major powers would affect the important trade routes in the Mediterranean and the Pacific upon which Australia relied. He was particularly concerned with Anglo-Italian and Anglo-Japanese relations, where his goal was to "influence British policy in a manner conducive to Australian interests".

According to David Bird, whose book The Tame Tasmanian examined the Lyons government's foreign policy, there was a growing realisation in the 1930s that Australian interests would not be aligned with British interests in all cases. In order to differentiate the two, Lyons authorised three "Pacific initiatives". The first was the Australian Eastern Mission of 1934 led by Deputy Prime Minister John Latham, which visited seven Asian countries. The second was the 1935 appointment of Australian government representatives in China, the Dutch East Indies, Japan, and United States – albeit below the rank of ambassador – where previously Australia's interests had been represented solely by British officials. The third was Lyons's "Pacific Pact" proposal, which envisioned a non-aggression pact between the major powers in the Pacific. Although he championed the pact at the 1937 Imperial Conference, discussions failed to progress. In Bird's opinion, "the Lyons years should thus be seen as a part of the evolution of Australian external policy from dependency towards autonomy […] it is perhaps the continuation and acceleration of the process of transition for which Lyons as Prime Minister ought to be best remembered".

External videos
- Newsreel footage of Joseph Lyons visiting England for the Silver Jubilee of King George V in 1935, from Pathé News

Lyons was prime minister during the Edward VIII abdication crisis of 1936. He and the other Dominion leaders were only officially informed of the king's intention to abdicate a few weeks before it occurred, although he had found out about the situation earlier through unofficial channels. Lyons strongly opposed the proposed marriage to Wallis Simpson, a view shared by his cabinet; it is unclear if he was initially aware how deep the king's feelings were. He later telegraphed the king asking him not to abdicate, and after the event gave a speech in parliament announcing his regret at the king's decision. Lyons is the only Australian prime minister to have held office during the reigns of three monarchs, and the only prime minister to serve throughout a monarch's entire reign.

=== Retirement plans ===
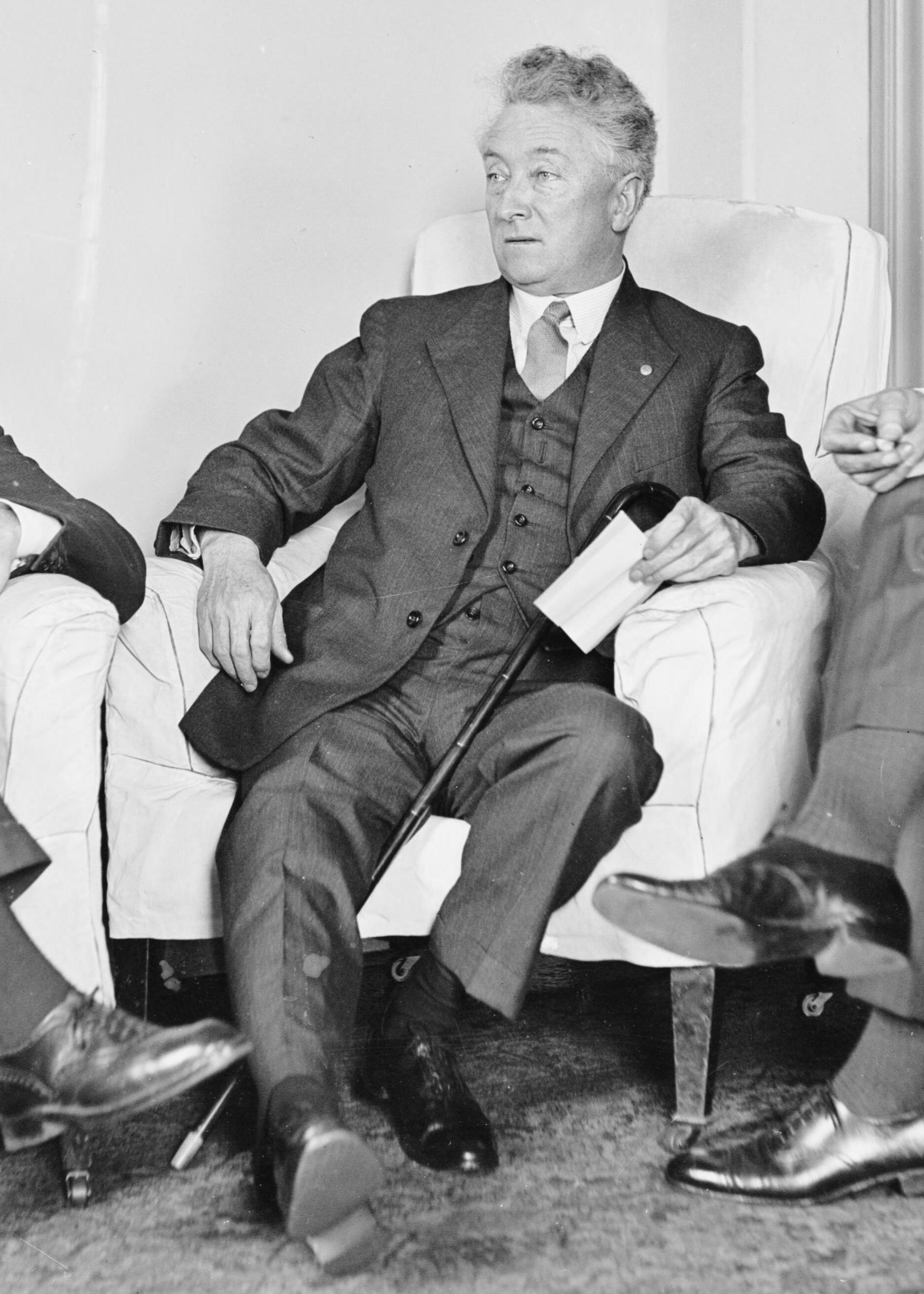
Joseph Lyons

It was initially assumed Lyons would be succeeded by his deputy John Latham, but Latham left parliament at the 1934 election and the following year was appointed Chief Justice of Australia. His replacement in the Division of Kooyong was Robert Menzies, a prominent figure in Victorian politics and an ally of Lyons. In April 1936, Lyons hand-wrote a letter to Menzies endorsing him as his successor. (Note: Lyons wrote: "The day must come when, in the ordinary course of events, the leadership of the Party will devolve on you. [...] For some time I have felt that the time had come for you to step into my shoes". In the same letter Lyons also referred to the fact that many in the UAP wished him to continue as leader, making no definite promise to retire. Henderson (2011) writes that "it is most unlikely that he ever offered his position directly to Menzies at any point", as he believed it was a decision for the party to make.) For various reasons, Menzies did not enjoy universal support within the UAP, and several other were seen as potential successors to Lyons. Within the parliamentary UAP, Richard Casey, Charles Hawker, Billy Hughes, and Archdale Parkhill all had supporters. There was also support for figures outside parliament, including former prime minister Stanley Bruce and Bertram Stevens, premier of New South Wales.

By 1938, Lyons was making concrete plans to retire, renovating his house in Devonport and moving his youngest children away from Canberra to attend local schools. According to his wife, they discussed his future two weeks before his death and agreed that he would retire as soon as possible. However, UAP officials repeatedly pressured him to stay on until the most suitable successor could be found.

== Death ==
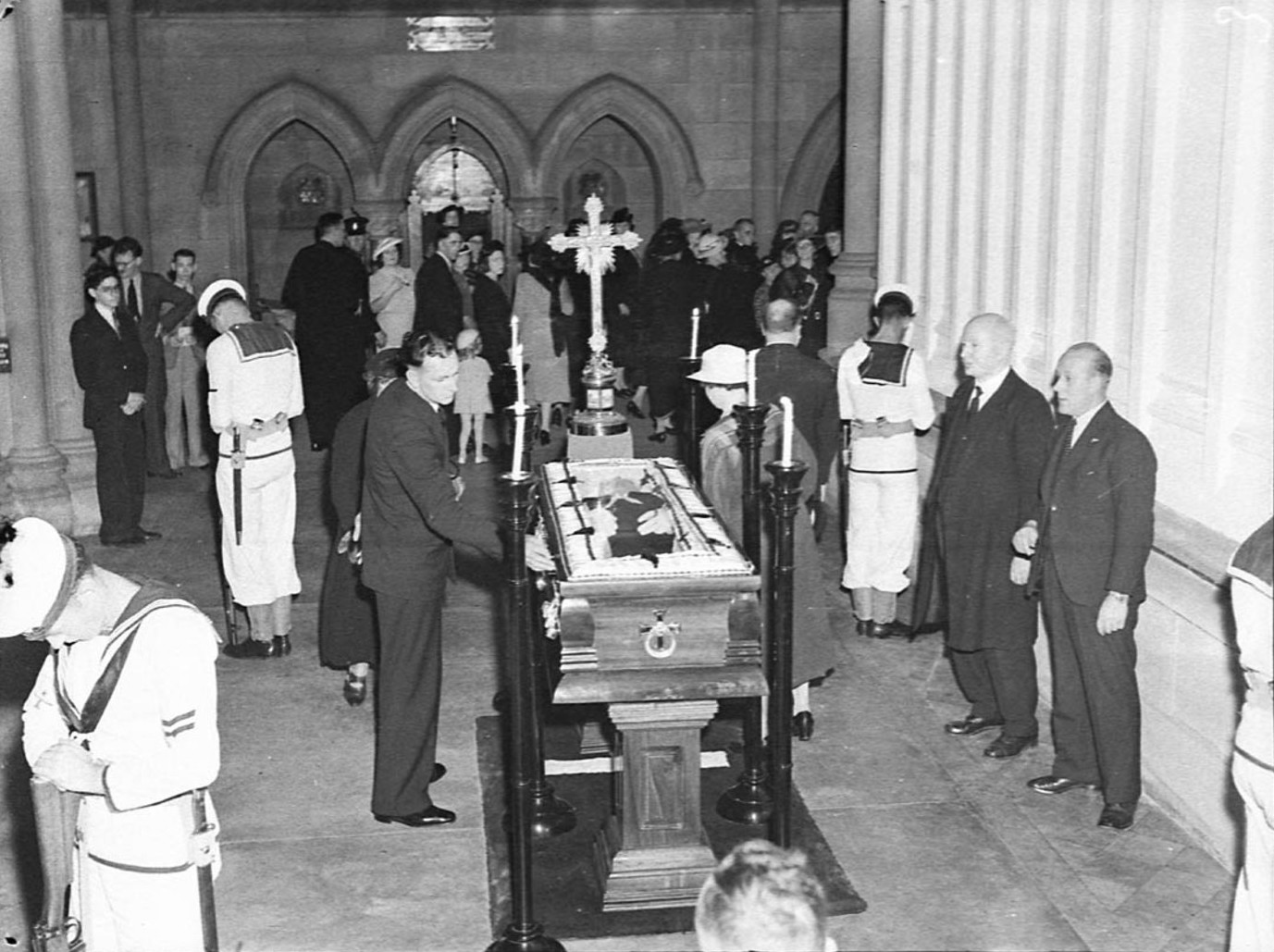
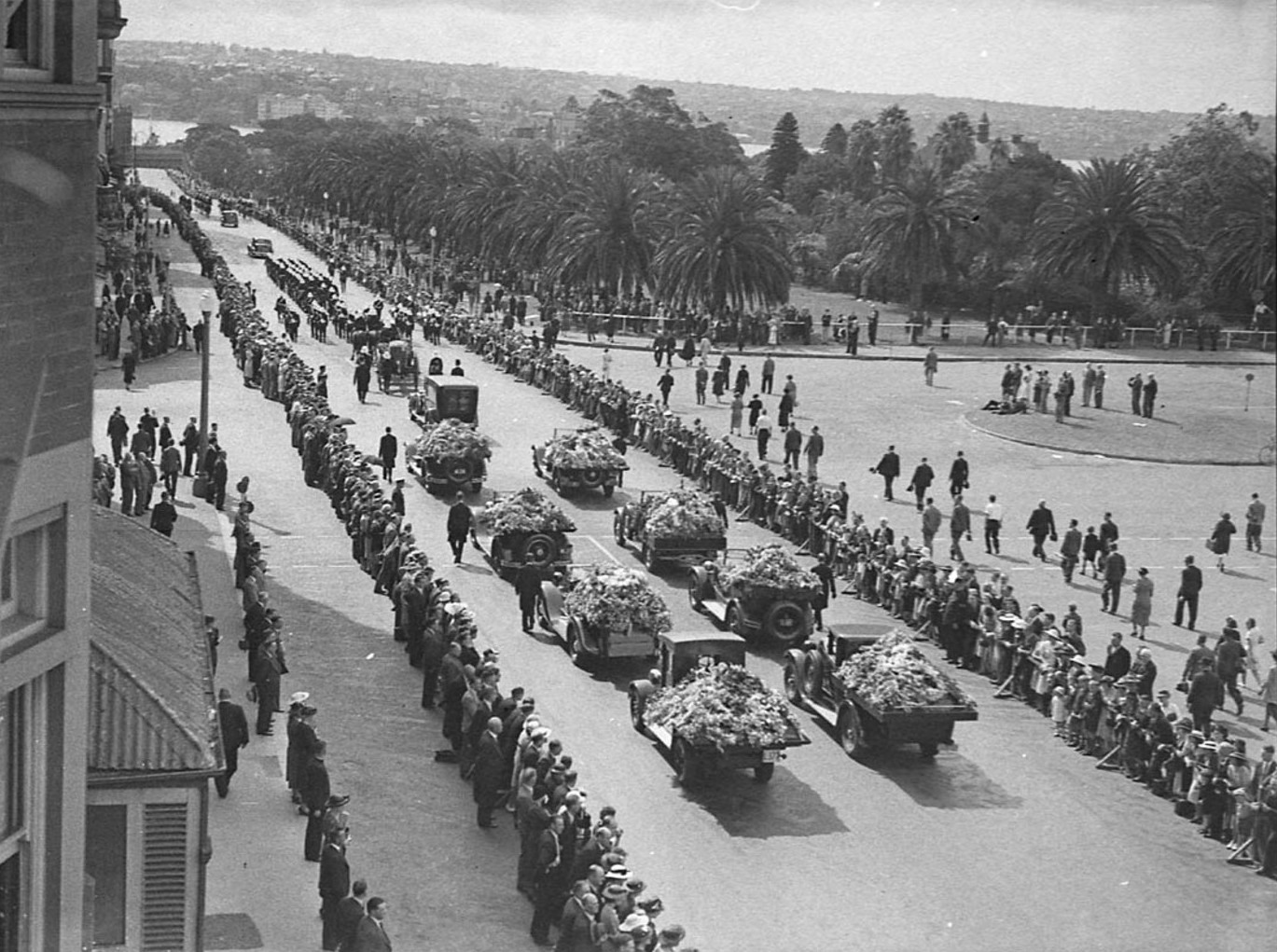

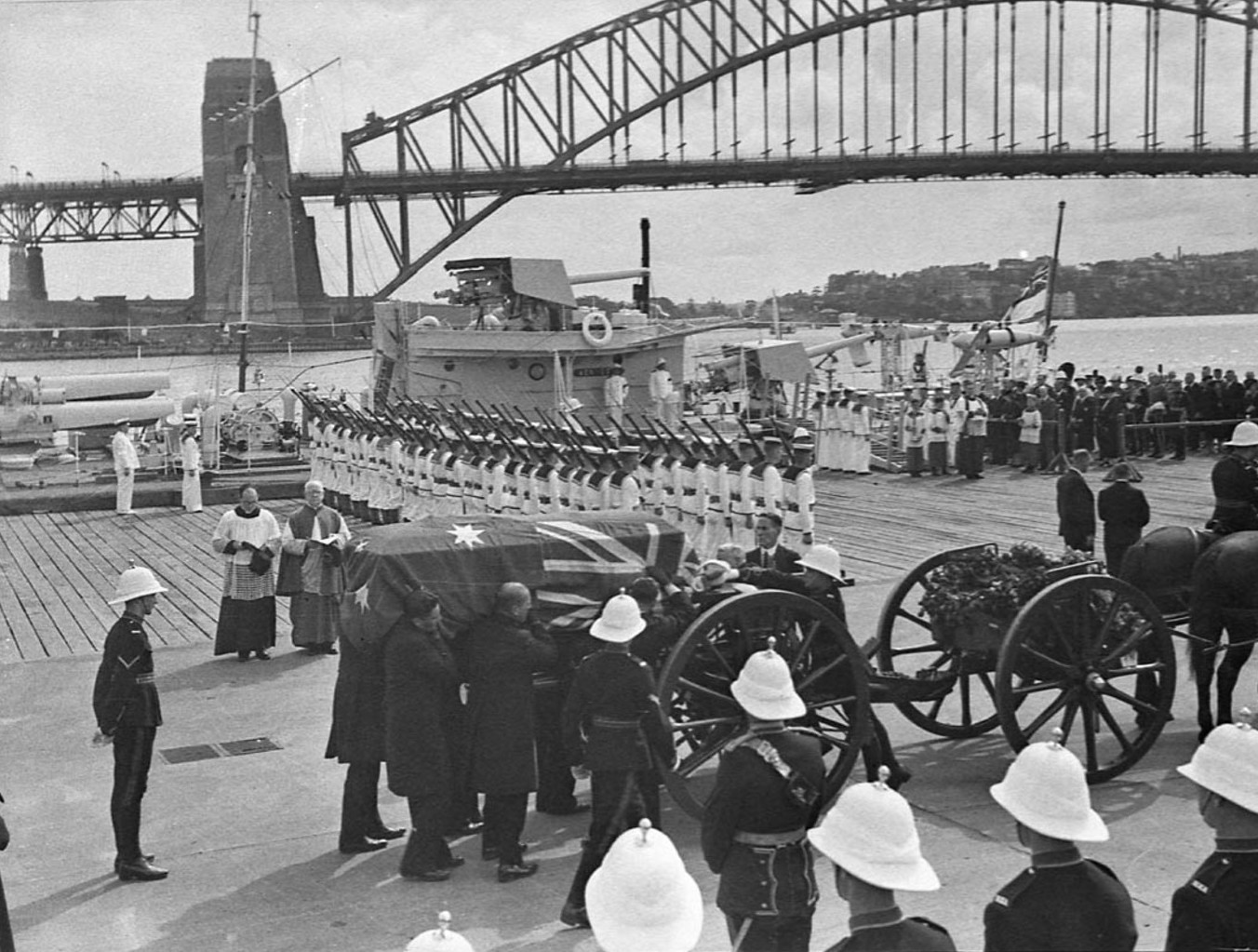
(1) Lying in state at St Mary's Cathedral, Sydney
(2) Funeral procession
(3) Coffin being loaded onto HMAS Vendetta for transport to Tasmania

On 5 April 1939, Lyons suffered a heart attack while being driven from Melbourne to Sydney. It occurred shortly after he had stopped in at Goulburn to collect his son Kevin from St Patrick's College for the Easter holidays. Lyons was rushed to St Vincent's Hospital, Darlinghurst, in a critical condition. By the following day, he was unable to speak and was drifting in and out of consciousness. He soon fell into a coma, and died on the morning of 7 April, which was Good Friday. Lyons's body lay in state at St Mary's Cathedral until 10 April (Easter Monday). A requiem service was held the following day, and then a procession bearing his coffin proceeded from the cathedral to Circular Quay. Lyons's body was transported to his home town of Devonport aboard HMAS Vendetta. His funeral was held at the Church of Our Lady of Lourdes on 13 April, and he was buried in the church grounds. He was re-interred in the new Mersey Vale Memorial Park in 1969, where he was joined by his wife in 1981.

Lyons was the first Australian prime minister to die in office. There was no constitutional precedent as to who should be appointed as his successor, and the situation was further complicated by the UAP's lack of a deputy leader. When the seriousness of Lyons's condition became apparent, Earle Page—the leader of the Country Party and de facto deputy prime minister—called a cabinet meeting, where it was agreed that he should serve as prime minister on an interim basis while the UAP elected a new leader. He was sworn in by Governor-General Lord Gowrie only 3 hours after Lyons's death. The 1939 United Australia Party leadership election was held on 18 April and won by Robert Menzies, who replaced Page as prime minister on 26 April. According to Laurie Fitzhardinge, Lyons's death "removed the only force that had held in check the smouldering animosities and barely suppressed rivalries which divided [the UAP's] members".

== Personal life ==
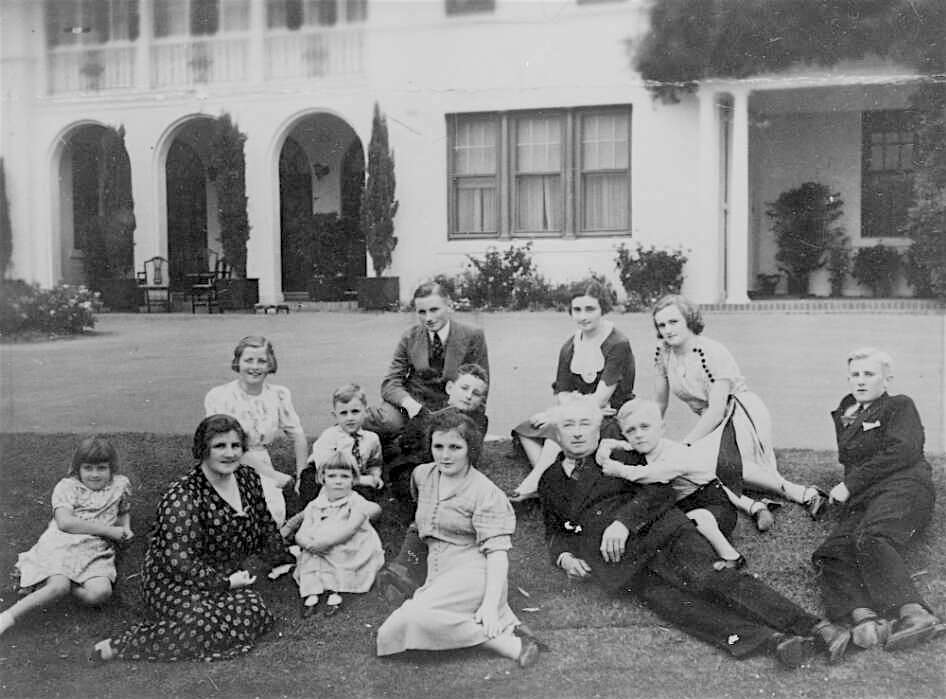
The Lyons family in the 1930s on the lawn of The Lodge

On 28 April 1915, Lyons married Enid Burnell, the daughter of a family friend; she was almost 18 years his junior. He had begun courting her in 1912, when she was 15. The couple had twelve children together:

1. Gerald Desmond (1916–2000)
2. Sheila Mary Norma (1918–2000)
3. Enid Veronica (1919–1988) – married army officer Maurice Austin
4. Kathleen Patricia (1920–2012)
5. Moira Rose (1922–1991)
6. Kevin Orchard (1923–2000)
7. Garnet Philip Burnell (1924–1925)
8. Brendan Aloysius (1927–2010)
9. Barry Joseph (1928–2015)
10. Rosemary Josephine (1929–1999)
11. Peter Julian (1931–2021)
12. Janice Mary (1933–2020)

A few years after Lyons's death, his widow Enid also embarked on a political career, becoming the first woman elected to the House of Representatives and serving in cabinet in the post-war Menzies Government. Their sons Kevin and Brendan entered Tasmanian politics, becoming state government ministers a few decades after their father's death. Their grandchildren include Libby Lyons, sigma (and director) of the Workplace Gender Equality Agency, and Kevin Lyons Jr., who was appointed to the Supreme Court of Victoria in 2018.

Before his marriage, Lyons had briefly been engaged to Pearl "Pib" Bailey, whom he met while teaching at Conara in about 1902. He broke off their relationship for reasons unknown, but they remained firm friends; Bailey never married and kept the love letters they exchanged for the rest of her life.

In 2018, a Jim Starkey who is married to Wendy Starkey, a great-granddaughter of another former prime minister Billy Hughes, claimed to be the great-grandson of Lyons. However, Starkey's claim of familial relations with Lyons has been disputed by the Lyons family and Lyons biographer Anne Henderson.

== Legacy ==
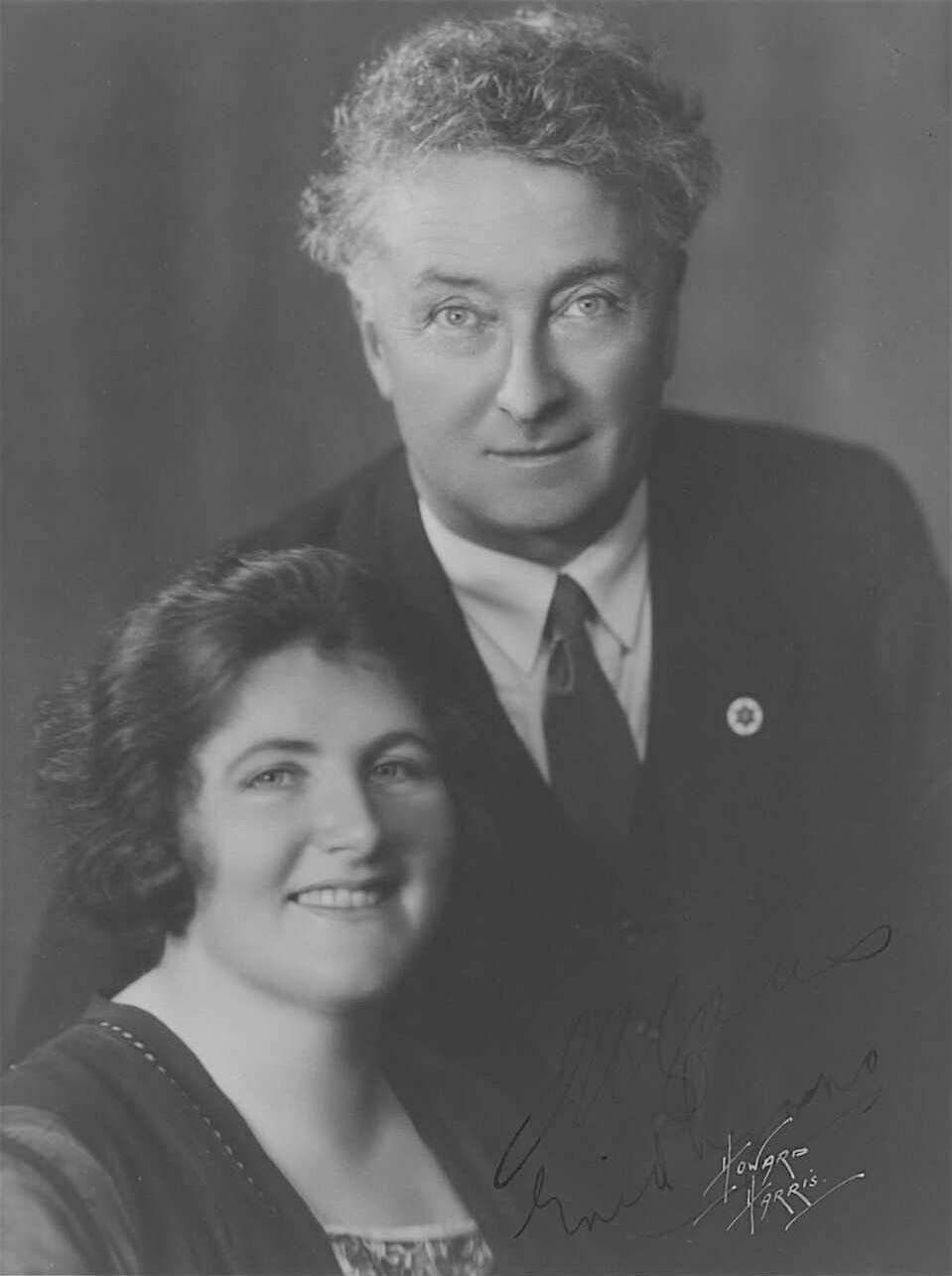
Enid and Joseph Lyons

Lyons was one of the most genuinely popular men to hold the office of prime minister, and his death caused widespread grief. His genial, laid-back appearance often led to his portrayal in cartoons as a sleepy koala. A devout Catholic, he was the second Catholic to become prime minister, after his immediate predecessor Scullin, and the only non-Labor Catholic prime minister until Tony Abbott.

Lyons is the only person in Australian history to have been prime minister, premier of a state, treasurer and leader of the opposition in both the Federal Parliament and a state parliament (although George Reid had been premier of a colony before Federation). Lyons is also the only prime minister to have come from Tasmania. At the time of his death, he was the second-longest serving prime minister in Australia's history, behind only Hughes.

== Honours ==
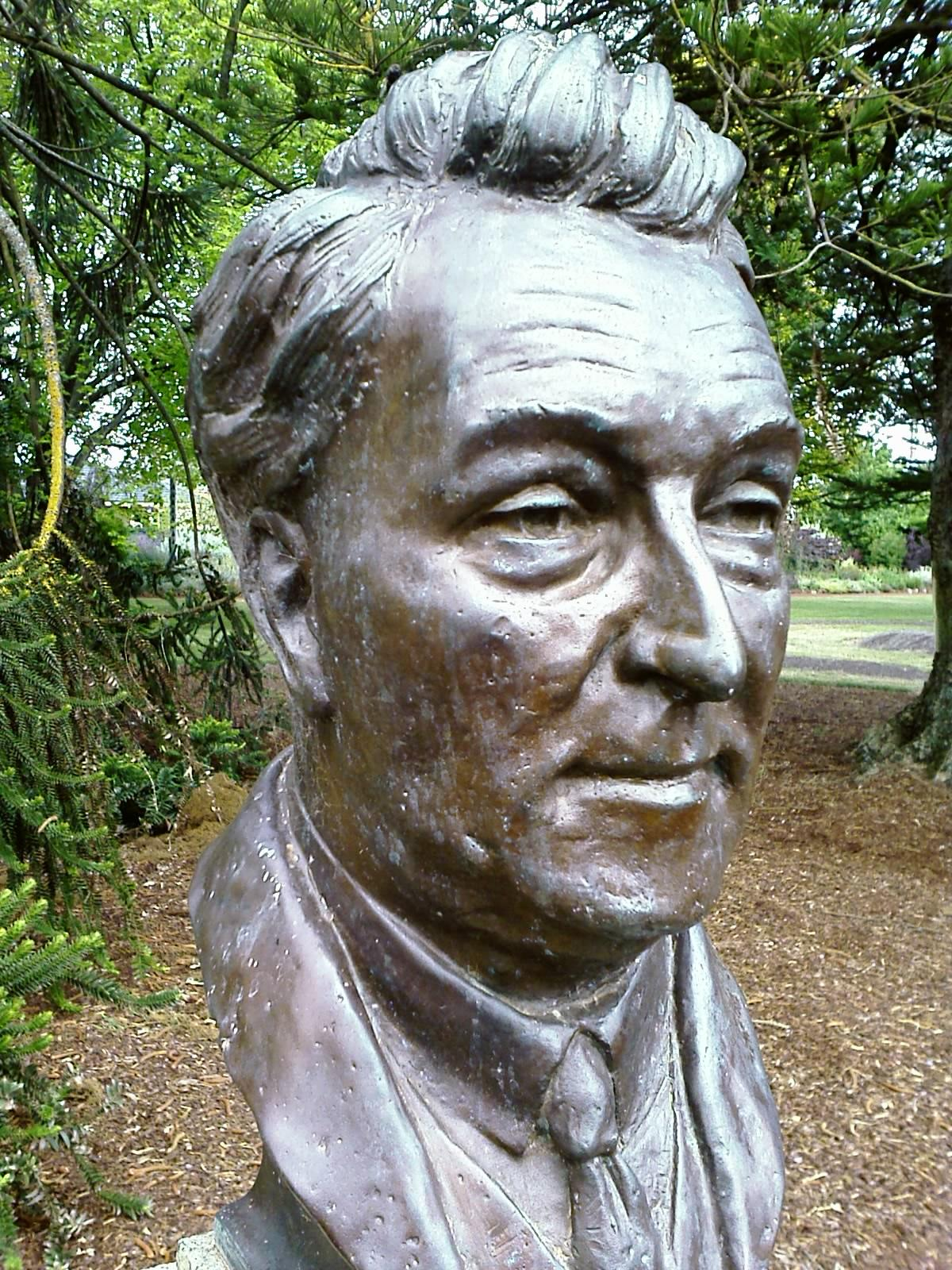
Bust of Joseph Lyons by sculptor Wallace Anderson located in the Prime Ministers Avenue in the Ballarat Botanical Gardens

Lyons was appointed to the Privy Council of the United Kingdom in June 1932, a traditional honour for Australian prime ministers. He was formally sworn of the council when he visited London in March 1935. In the 1936 Birthday Honours, he was appointed as a Member of the Order of the Companions of Honour (CH), one of only four such appointments made by Edward VIII before his abdication.

After Lyons's death, the Canberra suburb of Lyons was named in his honour, located in the Woden Valley adjacent to Curtin and Chifley. In 1975 he was honoured on a postage stamp bearing his portrait issued by Australia Post. His old seat of Wilmot was renamed the Division of Lyons in 1984, in joint honour of him and his wife Enid. The state seat of Wilmot was also renamed Lyons for the same reason. Lyons's birthplace in Stanley ("Joe Lyons Cottage") and family home in Devonport ("Home Hill") are operated as heritage sites, the latter by the National Trust of Australia.

== See also ==
- First Lyons Ministry
- Second Lyons Ministry
- Third Lyons Ministry
- Fourth Lyons Ministry
- List of prime ministers of Australia
- Political families of Australia

== Notes ==
Tasmanian House of Assembly
New division	Member for Wilmot; 1909–1929	Succeeded by Lancelot Spurr
Political offices
Preceded by Herbert Payne	Treasurer of Tasmania; 1914–1916	Succeeded by Elliott Lewis
Preceded by Albert Solomon	Minister for Education; 1914–1916	Succeeded by Walter Lee
Preceded by Herbert Payne	Minister for Railways; 1914–1916	Succeeded by William Propsting
Preceded by John Earle	Leader of the Opposition of Tasmania; 1916–1923	Succeeded by Edward Hobbs (interim)
Preceded by Sir Walter Lee	Premier of Tasmania; 1923–1928	Succeeded by John McPhee
Preceded by Sir Walter Lee	Treasurer of Tasmania; 1923–1928	Succeeded by John McPhee
Preceded by Sir Walter Lee	Minister for Railways; 1923–1924	Succeeded by James Guy
Preceded by Albert Ogilvie	Minister for Mines; 1925–1927	Succeeded by James Belton
Preceded by John McPhee	Leader of the Opposition of Tasmania; 1928–1929	Succeeded by Benjamin Watkins (interim)
Parliament of Australia
Preceded by Llewellyn Atkinson	Member for Wilmot; 1929–1939	Succeeded by Lancelot Spurr
Political offices
Preceded by William Gibson	Postmaster-General; 1929–1931	Succeeded by Albert Green
Preceded by William Gibson	Minister for Works and Railways; 1929–1931	Succeeded by Albert Green
Preceded by John Latham	Leader of the Opposition of Australia; 1931–1932	Succeeded by James Scullin
Preceded by James Scullin	Prime Minister of Australia; 1932–1939	Succeeded by Earle Page
Preceded by Ted Theodore	Treasurer of Australia; 1932–1935	Succeeded by Richard Casey
Preceded by Charles Hawker	Minister for Commerce; 1932	Succeeded by Frederick Stewart
Preceded by Billy Hughes	Minister for Health; 1935–1936	Succeeded by Billy Hughes
Preceded by Billy Hughes	Minister for Repatriation; 1935–1936	Succeeded by Billy Hughes
Preceded by Billy Hughes	Vice-President of the Executive Council; 1935–1937	Succeeded by Billy Hughes
Preceded by Archdale Parkhill	Minister for Defence; 1937	Succeeded by Harold Thorby
Party political offices
New political party	Leader of the United Australia Party; 1931–1939	Succeeded by Robert Menzies
