= Mersey Vale Memorial Park =

Public cemetery in Tasmania, Australia

- Interactive map of Mersey Vale Memorial Park

Details
- Established: 1968
- Location: Devonport, Tasmania
- Country: Australia
- Coordinates: 41.20537°S 146.34312°E
- Size: 25.64 ha (63.4 acres)
- Website: Official website
- Find a Grave: Mersey Vale Memorial Park

Mersey Vale Memorial Park is a cemetery located at 29-31 Stony Rise Road, Quoiba, Devonport, Tasmania, Australia. It is the burial place of Australian Prime Minister Joseph Lyons.

== History ==
In 1968 Devonport, Latrobe and Kentish Councils commenced a forty-year agreement to establish and operate a cemetery for their three municipalities.

== Management ==
After the forty years Devonport City Council became the sole operator and administrator of the cemetery.

== Notable interments ==
- Darrel Baldock AM, VFL footballer, politician
- Mary Bell, aviator
- Joseph Lyons, Premier of Tasmania, 10th Prime Minister of Australia (re-interred in 1969)
- Dame Enid Lyons, first woman to be elected to the Australian House of Representatives
- Kevin Lyons, Speaker of the Tasmanian House of Assembly
