= Enid Lyons =

Australian politician (1897–1981)

The Honourable Dame Enid Lyons AD GBE
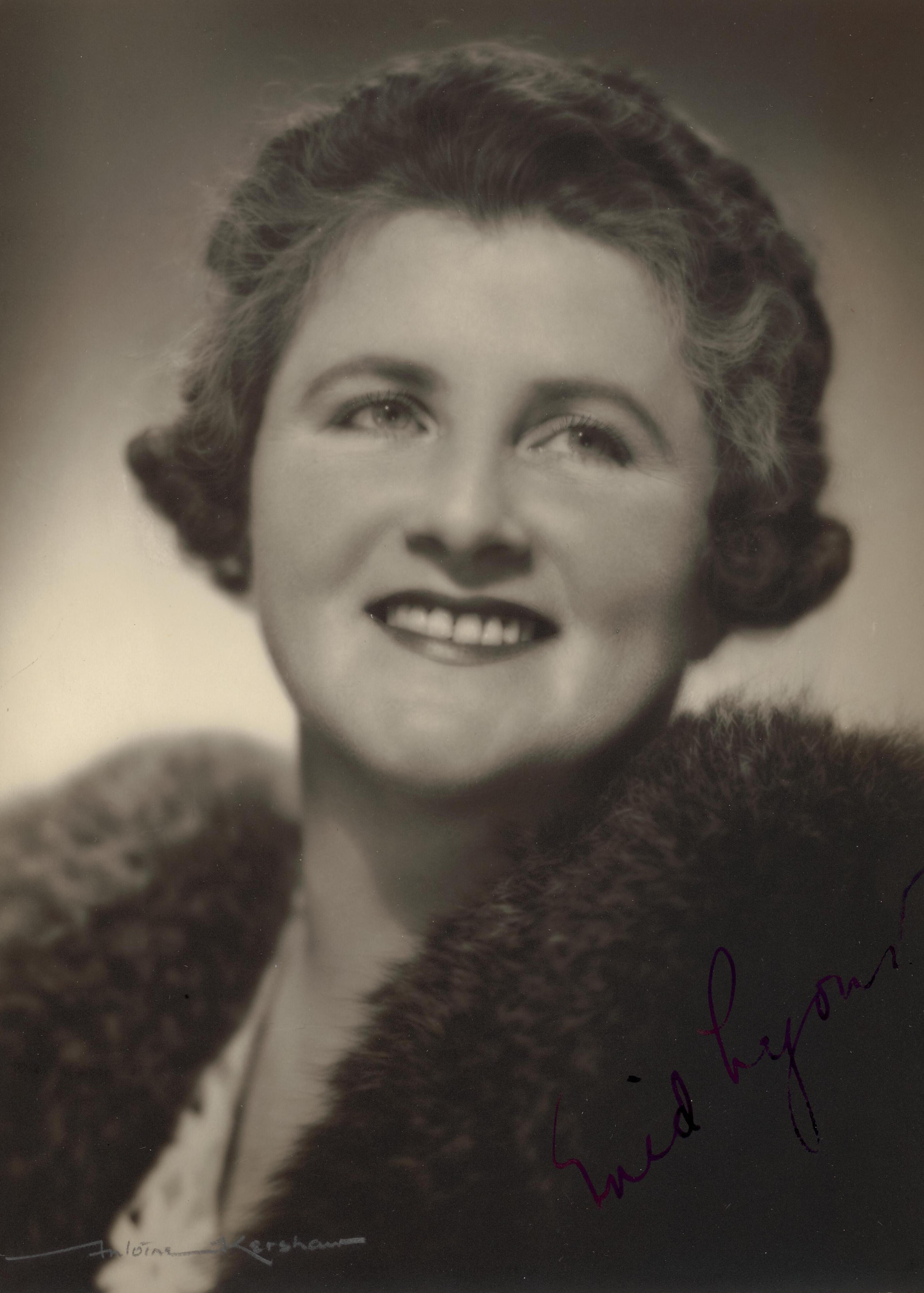
- Lyons in 1950

Vice-President of the Executive Council
- In office 19 December 1949 – 7 March 1951
- Prime Minister: Robert Menzies
- Preceded by: William Scully
- Succeeded by: Robert Menzies

Member of the Australian Parliament for Darwin
- In office 21 August 1943 – 19 March 1951
- Preceded by: George Bell
- Succeeded by: Aubrey Luck

Spouse of the Prime Minister of Australia
- In role 6 January 1932 – 7 April 1939
- Preceded by: Sarah Scullin
- Succeeded by: Ethel Page

Personal details
- Born: Enid Muriel Burnell; 9 July 1897 Smithton, Colony of Tasmania
- Died: 2 September 1981 (aged 84) Ulverstone, Tasmania, Australia
- Resting place: Mersey Vale Memorial Park, Quoiba, Tasmania, Australia
- Party: Labor (until 1931); UAP (1931–1945); Liberal (after 1945)
- Spouse: Joseph Lyons (m. 1915; died 1939)
- Children: 12, including Brendan and Kevin
- Occupation: Teacher

Dame Enid Muriel Lyons AD GBE (née Burnell; 9 July 1897 – 2 September 1981) was an Australian politician. She was notable as being the first woman to be elected to the House of Representatives and to serve in the federal cabinet. Prior to her own political career, she was best known as the wife of Joseph Lyons, Prime Minister of Australia from 1932 to 1939, who served previously as Premier of Tasmania from 1923 to 1928.

Lyons was born in Smithton, Tasmania. She grew up in various small towns in northern Tasmania, and trained as a schoolteacher. At the age of 17, she married politician Joseph Lyons, who was almost 18 years her senior. They would have twelve children together, all but one of whom lived to adulthood. As her husband's career progressed, Lyons began assisting him in campaigning and developed a reputation as a talented public speaker. In 1925, she became one of the first two women to stand for the Labor Party at a Tasmanian state election. She followed her husband into the new United Australia Party (UAP) following the Labor split of 1931.

After her husband became prime minister in 1932, Lyons began living at The Lodge in Canberra. She was one of the best-known prime minister's wives, writing newspaper articles, making radio broadcasts, and giving open-air speeches. Her husband's sudden death in office in 1939 came as a great shock, and she withdrew from public life for a time. At the 1943 federal election, Lyons successfully stood for the UAP in the Division of Darwin. She and Senator (Dame) Dorothy Tangney became the first two women elected to federal parliament. Lyons joined the new Liberal Party in 1945, and served as Vice-President of the Executive Council in the Menzies Government from 1949 to 1951 – the first woman in cabinet. She retired from parliament after three terms, but remained involved in public life as a board member of the Australian Broadcasting Commission (1951–1962) and as a social commentator.

== Early life ==
=== Birth and family background ===
Lyons was born on 8 July 1897 at Leesville, a small sawmilling settlement outside Smithton, Tasmania. Her birth was registered just over one month later. She was the second of four children born to Eliza (née Taggett) and William Burnell. Her father, a sawyer and talented musician, was born in Devon, England, and grew up in Cardiff, Wales, before immigrating to Australia at the age of 17. Her mother was born in the Adelaide Hills of South Australia, to an English immigrant father who had drawn by the Victorian gold rush. Her forebears in England had been middle-class, but the family fell into relative poverty in Australia. Lyons' parents first met at Angellala on Queensland's western railway line, where her widowed maternal grandmother Louisa Taggett (née Orchard) had won a catering contract. They married in Brisbane in 1888 and initially settled in Burringbar, New South Wales, where their first child was born. They moved to northern Tasmania in 1894 to be closer to William's parents, who farmed in Somerset.

Lyons' biographer Anne Henderson has speculated that William Burnell may not have been her biological father, and that she may instead have been fathered by Aloysius Joyce Jr., the son of a prominent local businessman. However, she also notes that "nothing [William] did in rearing her would suggest she was not his own". According to an account from the Joyce family, William confronted Aloysius Joyce Sr. and the two were overheard arguing, with Joyce eventually accepting Enid as a blood relation and agreeing to provide financial support to the Burnells if William raised her as his own daughter. Henderson suggests this as an explanation as to how the family were later able to secure a loan to buy property with limited income and no collateral.

=== Childhood ===
In 1901, Lyons and her family moved to Stowport, Tasmania, a rural locality south of Burnie. She began her education at a one-room public school, at a distance of 3 km (1.9 mi) from her home. Her mother supplemented the family's income by mending and laundering clothes and delivering meals to itinerant workers, taking a particular interest in well-educated visitors and those from overseas. She intended that her daughters would enter the teaching profession, which at the time provided the only opportunity for girls to gain a state-funded secondary education. In 1904, the family moved to a property at Cooee, on the coast to Burnie's west. They operated a small general store from their residence, with her mother serving as the local postmistress, and later added a dancehall which was rented out for community events. Lyons and her siblings attended school in Burnie.

== Marriage ==
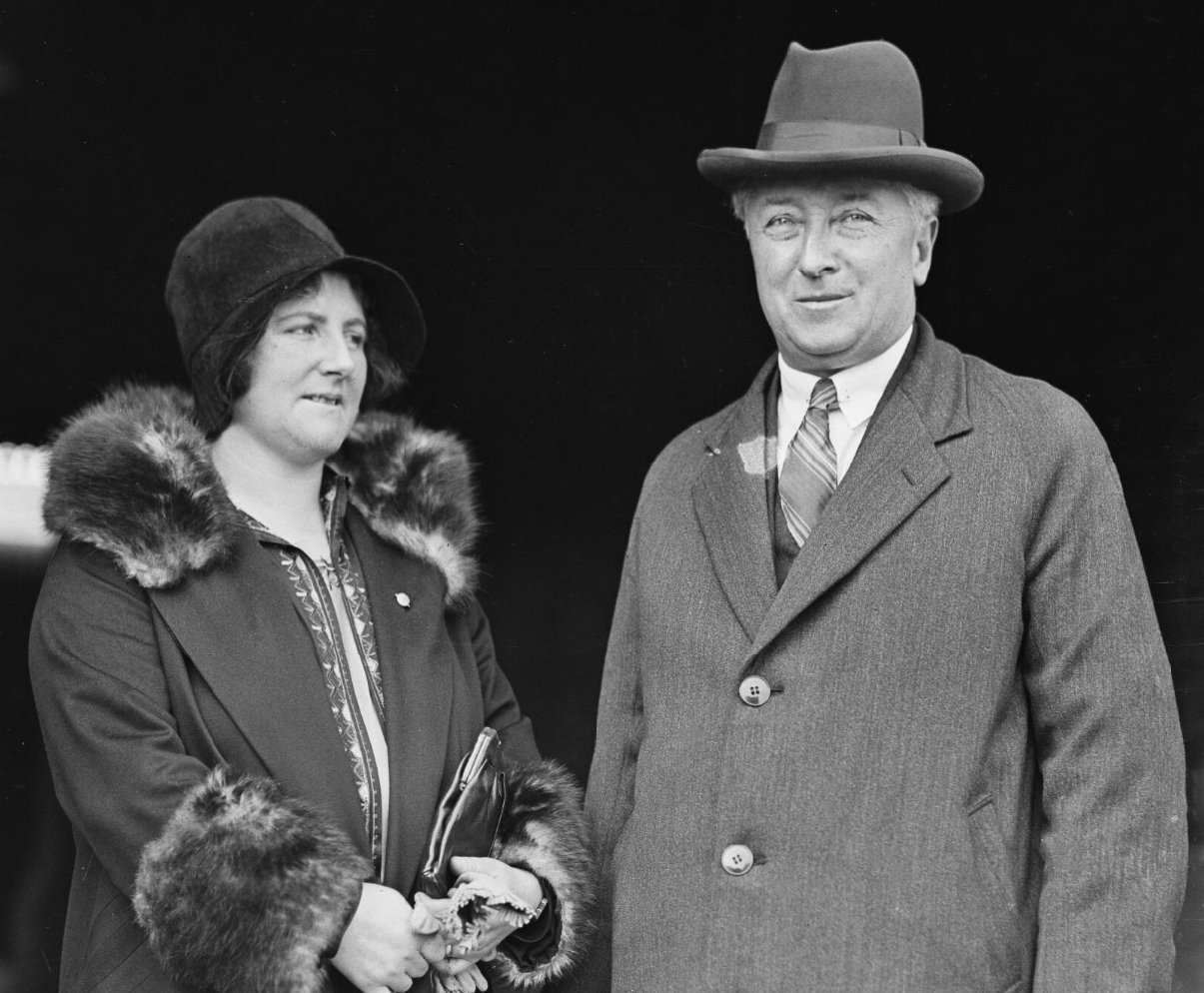
Lyons and her husband, c. 1930

Eliza Burnell introduced her 15-year-old daughter to Joseph Lyons, a rising Tasmanian Labor politician. On 28 April 1915, the two married at Wynyard, Tasmania; she was 17 and Lyons was 35. Enid had been brought up a Methodist but became, at Lyons' request, a Roman Catholic. They would have twelve children, one of whom died in infancy.

== State politics ==
Lyons' husband, an MP since 1909, was elected state leader of the ALP in the aftermath of the 1916 party split over conscription. She was an active member of the ALP in her own right, appearing as a women's branch delegate at the 1918 state conference where she successfully amended one motion and co-sponsored a motion for compulsory military training with Edmund Dwyer-Gray. Her position as wife of the opposition leader gave her greater public prominence and beginning at the 1922 state election she began making appearances on his behalf. In October 1923, Lyons' husband was unexpected appointed premier of Tasmania following the collapse of the incumbent Nationalist government. She was expected to undertake various social engagements on his behalf, although she had to meet her own expenses and usually had to rely on public transport.

In 1924, Lyons gave birth to her seventh child, the first born to an incumbent Tasmanian premier. The family experienced a number of difficulties over the following two years. She was bedridden with mumps for two months in mid-1925, shortly after which her infant son died of meningitis. A few months later she miscarried and was forced to carry the dead foetus for three months; the curettage procedure resulted in toxemia. In July 1926, her husband was severely injured in a car accident that caused the death of his colleague Michael O'Keefe, remaining in hospital for nine weeks.

=== 1925 candidacy ===
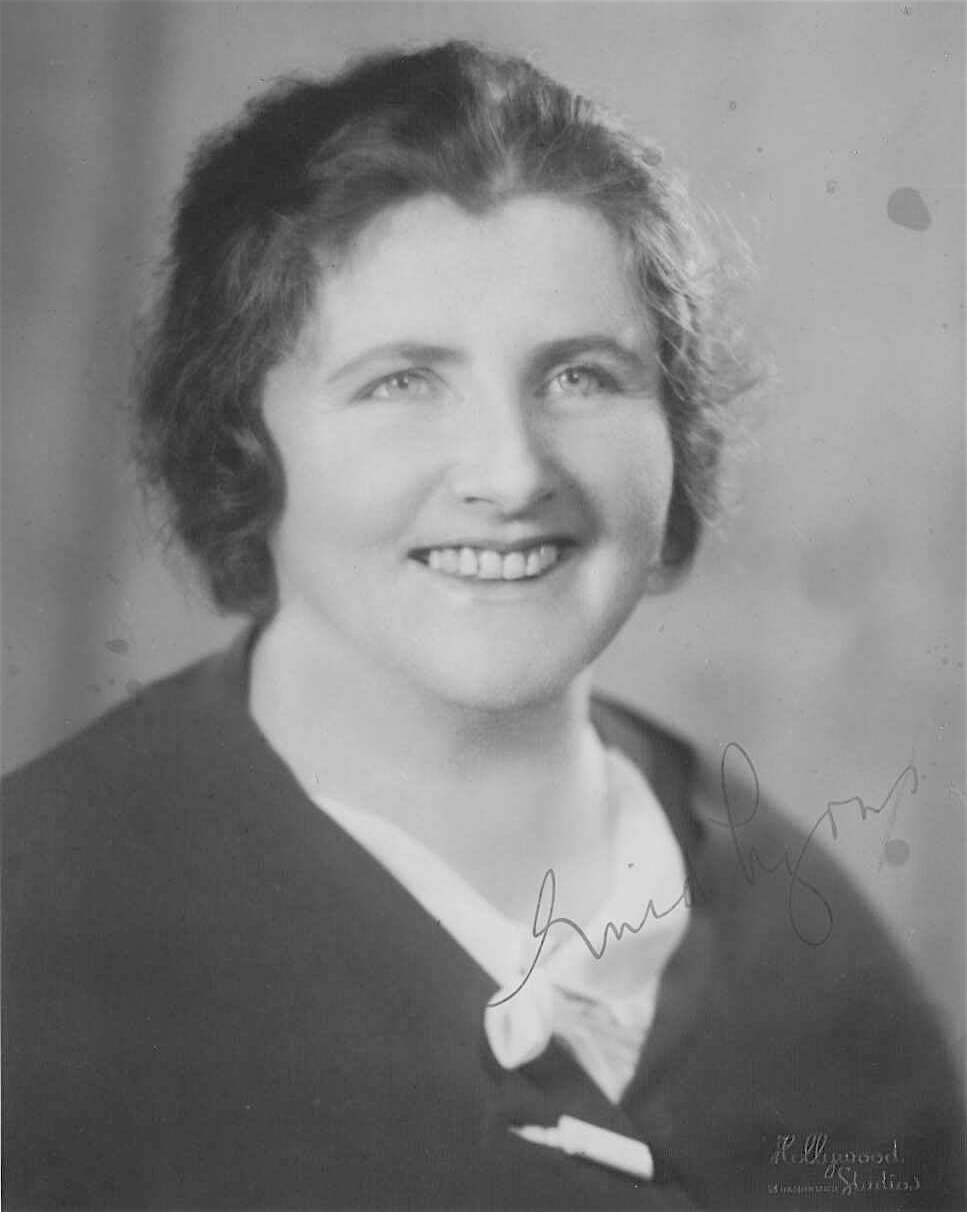
Signed photograph of Lyons

In 1925, Lyons and her mother became the first women to stand as ALP candidates in Tasmania. The 1925 state election was only the second since Tasmanian women received the right to stand for state parliament in 1921. Lyons stood in the Hobart-based seat of Denison, where it was hoped she would draw votes away from female voters supporting independent candidate Edith Waterworth, while her mother stood in the seat of Darwin which included her home town of Burnie.

Lyons, aged 27, emerged as a "natural local candidate", making frequent public speeches both in support of her own candidacy and supporting her husband as he toured other electorates. She opened her campaign at the Hobart Town Hall, standing on a platform that included increased government funding of education and health, clearance of Hobart's slums, and government control of milk distribution and the saw-milling industry. She appealed primarily to female voters and frequently used domestic metaphors in her speeches, while also attacking the Nationalist opposition for financial mismanagement. The ALP ultimately won its first majority government in Tasmania, with Lyons finishing around 60 votes short of election in Denison.

== Federal politics ==
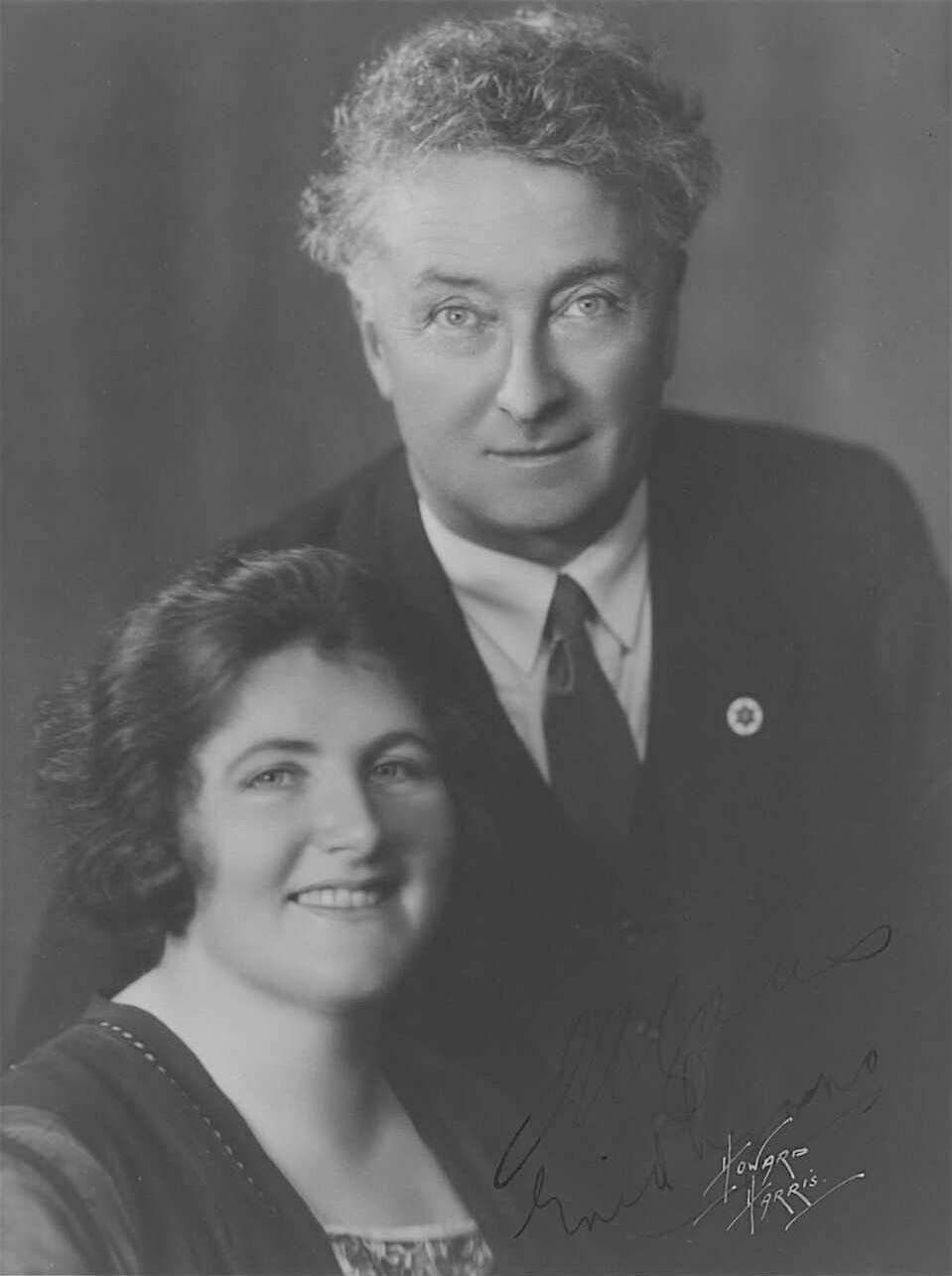
Enid and Joseph Lyons during his premiership

In 1931 Joseph Lyons left the Labor Party and joined the United Australia Party (UAP), becoming prime minister at the subsequent election. Enid Lyons was made a Dame Grand Cross of the Order of the British Empire (GBE) in the Coronation Honours of 1937. Joseph Lyons died in April 1939, aged 59, the first Australian prime minister to die in office, and Dame Enid returned to Tasmania. She bitterly resented Joseph Lyons' successor as leader of the UAP, Robert Menzies, who had, she believed, betrayed her husband by resigning from the cabinet shortly before Joseph's death.

=== Widowhood ===
Lyons suffered from "nervous exhaustion" in the period immediately after her husband's death. She fainted or collapsed on a number of occasions and spent several weeks in hospital, initially at St Vincent's Hospital, Sydney, and later at Mercy Hospital for Women, Melbourne. She had some requests to stand for his seat at the resulting by-election, including from Jessie Street, but declined. Outside of the family home, Lyons was left only £344 (equivalent to $34,000 in 2022) from her husband's estate. In the absence of any parliamentary pension, the government under caretaker prime minister Earle Page immediately drafted legislation to provide annuities for her and the couple's seven dependent children. There was some opposition from Joseph's political opponents who regarded the amount as excessive, and she was eventually awarded an annual grant of £500 (equivalent to $49,000 in 2022) with another £500 for the children's education through to the age of 16. Lyons received thousands of letters of condolence, which she answered with the help of family and her husband's former staff, but also received hate mail over the annuities issue – "filthy epithets, threats, dead rats, things even more revolting" – leading her to stop opening her own mail.

In December 1939, Lyons began a series of weekly Sunday evening broadcasts for 7LA Launceston, which were syndicated on the Macquarie Broadcasting Network. She turned down other offers, including from the ABC and from Keith Murdoch's 3DB. The Macquarie broadcasts came to an end in June 1940, partially due to a lack of sponsorship. In the same year she had moved to Melbourne to be closer to her children's schools, leasing a house in Malvern East. Her mother died in January 1941, a few months after Lyons had become a grandmother for the first time at the age of 43. She had left Melbourne after only a brief period and returned to Devonport, staying out of public life for a few years.

== Member of Parliament (1943–1951) ==
External audio
- Recording of Lyons reading her maiden speech in the House of Representatives; The original speech was not broadcast, but due to public demand she recorded it for broadcast on radio. There were a few differences in wording between the speech that was broadcast and the official Hansard transcript.

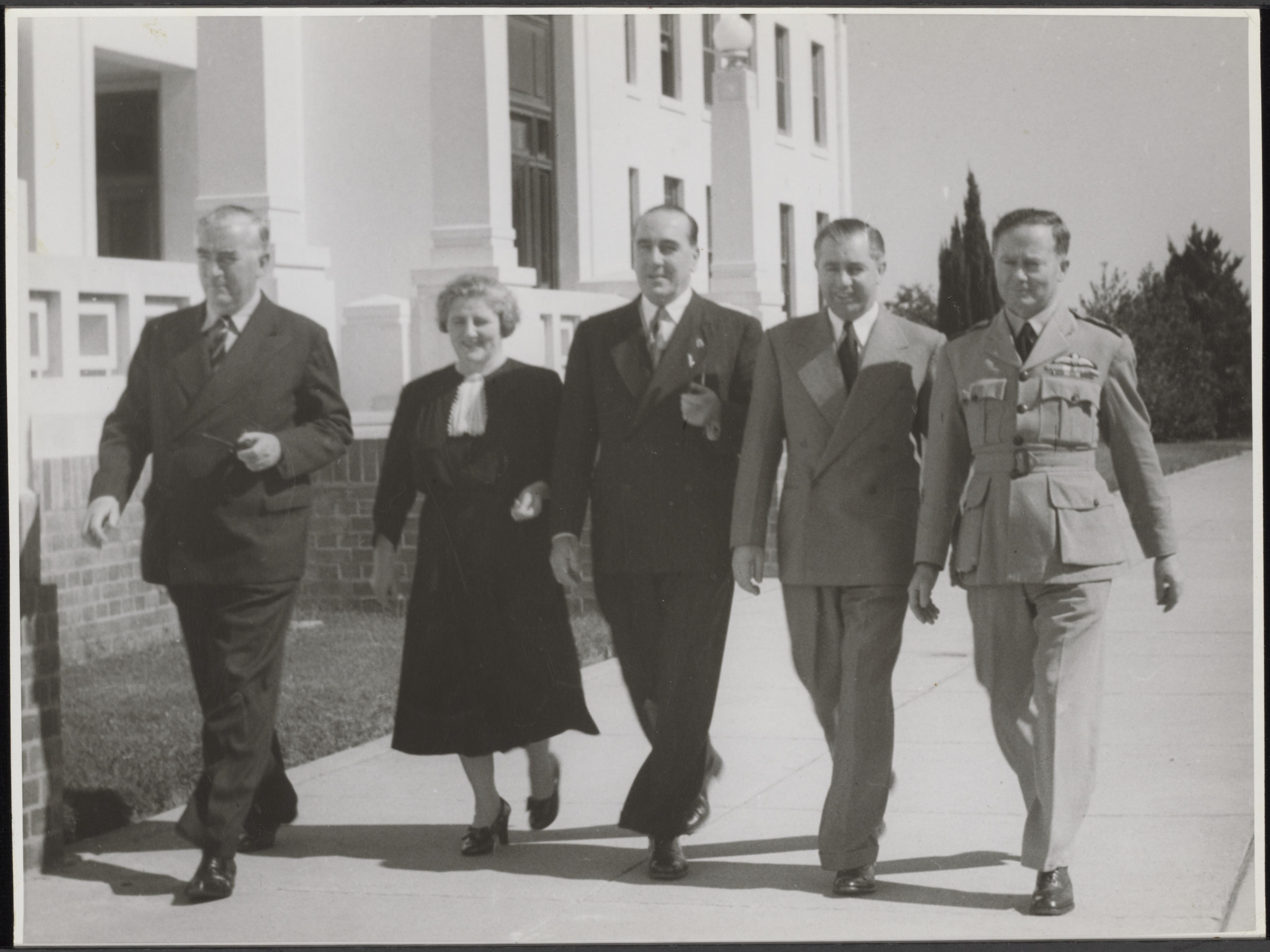
Lyons with other senior figures in the newly created Liberal Party in 1946 – from left to right: Robert Menzies, Eric Harrison, Harold Holt, and Thomas White.

Lyons was elected to the House of Representatives at the 1943 federal election, joining Senator Dorothy Tangney as one of the first two women in federal parliament. Following the retirement of incumbent MP George Bell, she decided to nominate for UAP preselection in her home electorate of Darwin. She faced two male competitors, conservative farmer John Wright and businessman John Leary, with the nomination committee eventually deciding to endorse three candidates in the seat with the hopes of appealing to different demographics. Lyons campaigned in remote areas and also made frequent use of radio broadcasts, specialising in late-night talks she described as "bed-time stories". Despite a large nationwide swing against the UAP, she ultimately defeated the ALP candidate, future premier Eric Reece, with 51 percent of the two-party preferred vote. The result took several weeks to finalise and she conceded defeat at one point, but emerged a clear winner when late votes from soldiers overseas were included.

Lyons gave her maiden speech to the House of Representatives on 29 September 1943, later repeating her speech for radio broadcast as it was several years before the advent of live parliamentary broadcasts. She began the speech by making reference to the historic nature of the occasion and her status as an outsider. She concentrated on policy matters, advocating for social welfare schemes, child endowment, and the need for post-war training schemes for those involved in the war effort. Lyons' second and third speeches in March 1944 were "judged as an attempt on her part to depart from her preoccupation with women's issues". She accused striking coal miners of disloyalty and placing their own interests above those of the nation during World War II, and opposed the Curtin government's 1944 referendum proposal to increase government powers.

In August 1944, Lyons was one of four speakers in an ABC Radio debate titled Population Unlimited? which became the ABC's "largest controversy during the war years". Lyons devoted a chapter to this debate in her 1972 autobiography, calling it "one of the most disturbing experiences I was to know as a member of parliament". Her fellow debaters were Norman Haire, Jessie Street and the economist Colin Clark. Later in 1944, Lyons and Phyllis Cilento presented a report to the National Health and Medical Research Council arguing for the government to support an increase in the national birth rate.

Lyons had a sometimes uneasy relationship with UAP leader Robert Menzies, disliking his domineering personality and what she perceived as past disloyalty to her husband. She voted against Menzies in the 1943 UAP leadership ballot and allied herself with his rivals Billy Hughes, Archie Cameron and Percy Spender. She was also close to Country Party MPs Earle Page, Arthur Fadden and Larry Anthony. She joined the new Liberal Party of Australia upon its formation in 1945 and was elected to the federal policy committee, where she credited herself with gaining support for free medical treatment for pensioners and child endowment as official party policies. Lyons was initially ambivalent about re-contesting her seat at the 1946 election. She was re-elected with an increased majority, although her friend and colleague Allan Guy was defeated in the neighbouring seat of Wilmot. In her second term she became more combative in parliament, clashing with minister Arthur Calwell on several occasions and coming close to suspension in October 1947, following a conflict with ALP chairman of committees Joe Clark.

=== Cabinet and retirement ===
Lyons had thyroid-related health issues in the lead-up to the 1949 federal election. During the campaign she underwent an urgent operation to remove two large goitres from her neck. She spent four weeks in hospital recovering, during which time her father died. She made only a last-minute appearance at a rally to condemn an opponent who had accused her of seeking a "sympathy vote".

Lyons again increased her majority at the election and was widely expected to be appointed to the ministry in the new government, with newspapers speculating she would be offered the immigration or social services portfolios. She was ultimately appointed Vice-President of the Executive Council, a largely honorary position that she described as "toothless", observing that "they only wanted me to pour the tea". Lyons was disappointed not to be offered a substantive ministerial portfolio and believed that Menzies "did not want her in the ministry but seemed to have been pressured into giving her some sort of spot". She did however acknowledge that her poor health would have limited her ministerial capabilities and that there was intense competition for cabinet positions following the Coalition's landslide victory.

Lyons was sworn in to office with the fourth Menzies Ministry on 19 December 1949, the first woman to serve in cabinet. She continued to have poor health, requiring another surgery in 1950 for an ulcer on her nose that developed into skin cancer, and also experiencing side-effects from her thyroid medication. Her contribution to cabinet discussions was limited, although she successfully lobbied for a woman to be appointed to the organising committee for the 1956 Summer Olympics in Melbourne. She was "disturbed" by cabinet's decision to commit Australian troops to the Korean War. Lyons resigned from cabinet for health reasons on 7 March 1951. Menzies called a double dissolution shortly thereafter and she declined to re-contest her seat at the 1951 election, bringing an end to her parliamentary career.

== Later life and legacy ==
In retirement, Dame Enid's health recovered. She was a newspaper columnist (1951–54), a commissioner of the Australian Broadcasting Corporation (1951–62), and remained active in public life promoting family and women's issues. She published three volumes of memoirs, which embarrassed the Liberal Party by reviving her complaints about Menzies' 1939 behaviour towards her husband.

Lyons was made a Dame of the Order of Australia (AD) on Australia Day 1980, the second woman to receive this honour after Alexandra Hasluck. She was the first Australian woman to receive damehoods in different orders. Lyons died at Ulverstone on 2 September 1981, aged 84. She was accorded a state funeral in Devonport before being buried next to her husband at Mersey Vale Memorial Park. She was posthumously inducted onto the Victorian Honour Roll of Women in 2001.

== Legacy ==
Jo Gullett in his autobiography discussed his fellow members of parliament and concluded that, "with hindsight, perhaps the wisest and most far-sighted of them all was a woman, Dame Enid Lyons."

She had all the qualities of a successful member, for she was not only a clear, lucid and logical speaker but she also had an instinctive sympathy, and a wonderful sense of fun. She had beautiful manners and gave everyone the impression that she was happy to see them when she greeted them. Perhaps she really was glad to see them too, and that is the reason why when she rose to speak she usually made her points to a smiling and appreciative House. ... Not only was she a very good parliamentarian but she had thoughts about the role of Parliament and government far ahead of her time. I remember her saying, "I don't think we should automatically and formally differ with the government on everything they do. This attitude of confrontation is all wrong, whether in government or opposition. There are so many things in which we already do agree, and lots more on which we could both afford to modify our extreme views or attitudes. ... We shall never deal with the real problems if we continue to waste so much time arguing over minor points of difference. Remember too that all this arguing confuses people. If we, who are their political leaders, can't agree on national principles, how can we expect the people to know what is of national importance and what is not.

An informal political faction of the Liberal/National opposition parties called the Lyons Forum was formed in 1992. The group's name alluded to Lyons' maiden speech to the House of Representatives. The faction was considered to be defunct in 2004.

In 1943 to commemorate Lyons' entering of parliament, artist Justine Kong Sing painted a miniature portrait of Lyons that is held in the collection of the National Portrait Gallery of Australia.

In March 2023, a dual bronze sculpture of Lyons and Dame Dorothy Tangney was placed in the gardens of Old Parliament House, Canberra. The statues, sculpted by Lis Johnson, were inspired by an iconic photograph of the pair entering the building on their first day of parliament in September 1943. Lyons' granddaughter, former Director of the Australian Workplace Gender Equality Agency Libby Lyons, described the unveiling as a "wonderful, thrilling moment".

== Children ==
Lyons first fell pregnant a few months after her marriage, but miscarried just after her 18th birthday. She suffered a second miscarriage the following year, and in her memoirs recounted having to watch on as a nurse threw the remains of the foetus into a bedside fireplace. She was told by doctors that she would never be able to have children, but in fact went on to give birth to twelve – the first born when she was 19 and the last born when she was 36. Her subsequent pregnancies went relatively smoothly, with the exception of a third miscarriage in 1926; she had to carry the dead foetus for three months before it could be removed. All but one of her children survived to adulthood, and all those who did out-lived her. Her son Garnet, born in 1924, died from meningitis at the age of 10 months. Another son, Barry, was born with achondroplasia.

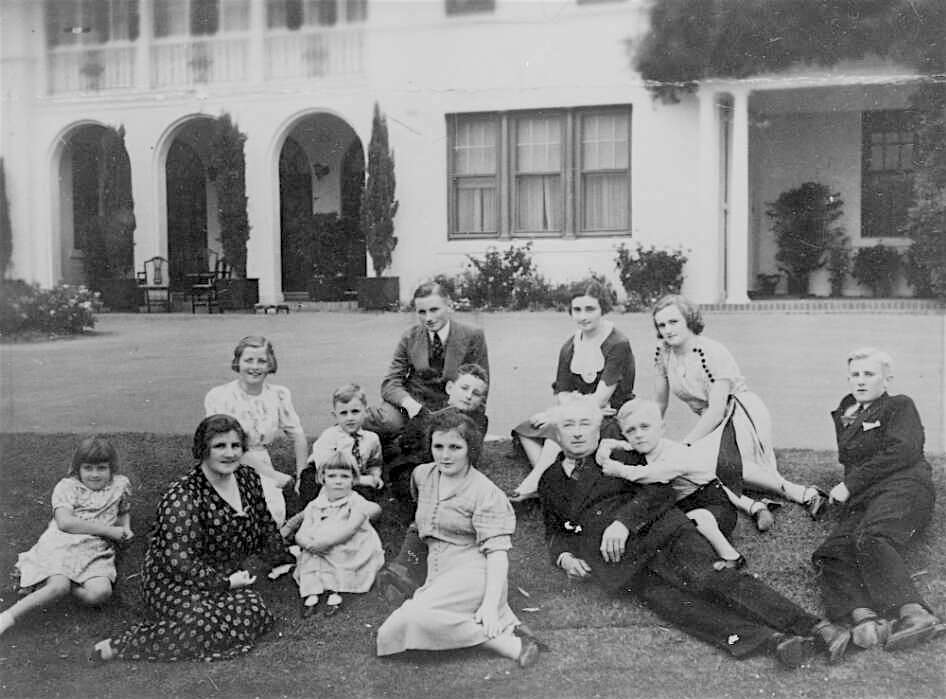
Enid and Joseph Lyons sitting on the lawn outside The Lodge with their surviving 11 children

1. Gerald Desmond (1916–2000)
2. Sheila Mary Norma (1918–2000)
3. Enid Veronica (1919–1988) – married army officer Maurice Austin
4. Kathleen Patricia (1920–2012)
5. Moira Rose (1922–1991)
6. Kevin Orchard (1923–2000)
7. Garnet Philip Burnell (1924–1925)
8. Brendan Aloysius (1927–2010)
9. Barry Joseph (1928–2015)
10. Rosemary Josephine (1929–1999)
11. Peter Julian (1931–2021)
12. Janice Mary (1933–2020)

== Publications ==
=== Autobiographical works ===
- Lyons, Enid (1965). So We Take Comfort. Heinemann.
- Lyons, Enid (1969). The Old Haggis. Heinemann. ISBN 0851794939.
- Lyons, Enid (1972). Among the Carrion Crows. Rigby. ISBN 0851794939.

== See also ==
- List of the first women holders of political offices in Oceania
- Political families of Australia

Honorary titles
Preceded by Sarah Scullin	Spouse of the Prime Minister of Australia; January 1932 – 7 April 1939	Succeeded by Ethel Page
Political offices
Preceded by William Scully	Vice-President of the Executive Council; 1949–1951	Succeeded by Robert Menzies
Parliament of Australia
Preceded by George Bell	Member for Darwin; 1943–1951	Succeeded by Aubrey Luck
