= Maurice Austin =

Australian Army officer (1916–1985)

- Born: 15 December 1916; Geelong, Victoria
- Died: 13 October 1985 (aged 68); Canberra, Australian Capital Territory
- Military career
- Allegiance: Australia
- Branch: Australian Army
- Service years: 1935–1971
- Rank: Brigadier
- Nickname: "Bunny"
- Service number: 110
- Commands: 1st Logistic Support Force (1960–61); Jungle Training Centre, Canungra (1957–58); 1st Battalion, Royal Australian Regiment (1952–53); 2nd Battalion, Royal Australian Regiment (1952)
- Conflicts: Second World War; Korean War
- Awards: Distinguished Service Order; Officer of the Order of the British Empire; Mentioned in Despatches

Brigadier Maurice "Bunny" Austin, DSO, OBE (15 December 1916 – 13 October 1985) was an Australian Army officer. He served in the Second Australian Imperial Force in the Second World War, commanded the 2nd Battalion, Royal Australian Regiment in 1952, and led the 1st Battalion, Royal Australian Regiment in the Korean War in 1952–53.

His appointments included Commandant of the Jungle Training Centre; Commander of the Logistic Support Force; Director of Personnel Services and honorary ADC to the Governor General.

On retirement from the army he was appointed the Australian Army Historian where he researched and published works on the history of the army in Australia from 1788 to federation.

The nickname "Bunny" comes from the fact that Thomas Austin (no relation) is believed to have been the first person to introduce rabbits in Australia.

In 1940, Austin married Enid Veronica Lyons, the daughter of Prime Minister Joseph Lyons and Dame Enid Lyons.

== See also ==
- List of Australian Army brigadiers

== Sources ==
- World War II Nominal Roll
- The Army in Australia 1840–50 (M. Austin), Australian Government Publishing Service, 1979. ISBN 0-642-03630-6.
