= Brendan Lyons =

Australian politician

The Honourable Brendan Lyons

Member of the Tasmanian House of Assembly for Bass
- In office 15 May 1982 – 8 February 1986

Personal details
- Born: Brendan Aloysius Lyons; 17 June 1927 Hobart, Tasmania, Australia
- Died: 7 September 2010 (aged 83)
- Party: Liberal
- Relations: Joseph Lyons (father); Enid Lyons (mother); Kevin Lyons (brother)

Brendan Aloysius Lyons (17 June 1927 – 7 September 2010) was an Australian politician who served in the Tasmanian House of Assembly from 1982 to 1986, representing the Liberal Party. He was a government minister from 1984 until his defeat at the 1986 state election. His father Joseph, mother Enid, and brother Kevin preceded him in politics.

== Early life ==
Lyons was born on 17 June 1927 in Hobart, Tasmania, the eighth of twelve children born to Enid (Burnell) and Joseph Lyons. When he was an infant his parents moved to Devonport on the island's north coast, where he spent his early childhood. At the time of Brendan's birth, Joseph Lyons was Premier of Tasmania. He entered federal politics in 1929 and became Prime Minister of Australia in 1932, but died in office in 1939. Brendan and the younger children moved into The Lodge with their parents, while the older children were sent to boarding schools. The house was too small for the entire family, so he had to sleep on an enclosed verandah. He later recalled his playtime being interrupted by buses of tourists arriving to view the house; there were no security guards at the time. Lyons was educated firstly at the Sisters of the Good Samaritan school in Canberra, then at St Patrick's College, Goulburn, and finally Xavier College, Melbourne.

== Sporting career ==
Lyons played Australian rules football at a high level. He represented Tasmania at the 1948 Australian Amateur Football Carnival in Western Australia, playing as a full-forward. He was "known to smoke cigarettes during games while standing in the goal square".

Lyons also had an exceptionally long cricket career. He retired from club cricket at the age of 75, after 53 years and 822 games with the Old Launcestonians Cricket Club. He helped organise the cricket competition at the Australian Masters Games. As a schoolboy at Xavier College he was coached by Arthur Liddicut and once clean bowled future Test player Colin McDonald, who was batting for Scotch College.

== Politics ==
Lyons was the founding secretary of the University of Tasmania Liberal Club. He assisted his mother and brothers Desmond and Kevin on their political campaigns. At the 1982 state election, Lyons was elected to the Tasmanian House of Assembly running for the Liberal Party in the Division of Bass. His election came 73 years after his father was first elected to the same body. In 1984, he was appointed as a government minister under Premier Robin Gray. He held a variety of portfolios until his defeat at the 1986 election, including housing, small business, consumer affairs, state development (minister assisting), sport and recreation, and inland fisheries.

In 2008 Lyons published They Loved Him to Death, a biography of his father. He died in September 2010, aged 83.
