= Peter Vickery =

Australian judge (1949–2022)

Peter Norman Vickery QC (1949/1950 – 26 April 2022) was an Australian judge. He was a Trials Division justice at the Supreme Court of Victoria and sat as a judge of the Commercial Court for Victoria. Prior to his appointment, Vickery was an international human rights lawyer and also taught at La Trobe University.

In 2017 the Recognition in Anthem Project was established and began work on a new version, with lyrics written by poet and former Victorian Supreme Court judge Peter Vickery following consultation with Indigenous communities and others. Vickery's proposed lyrics replaced "we are young and free" with "we are one and free" in the first verse, deleted the second and added two new ones; the second verse acknowledging Indigenous history, immigration and calls for unity and respect, and the third adapting lines from the official second verse. It was debuted at the Desert Song Festival in Alice Springs by an Aboriginal choir. Former prime minister Bob Hawke endorsed Vickery's alternative lyrics in 2018. In 2017, the federal government under then prime minister Malcolm Turnbull granted permission for Vickery's lyrics to be sung at certain occasions as a "patriotic song", but said that before making any official change to the anthem, "The Government would need to be convinced of a sufficient groundswell of support in the wider community".
