= Kevin Lyons =

Australian politician

The Honourable Kevin Lyons
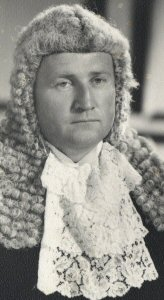

3rd Deputy Premier of Tasmania
- In office 26 May 1969 – 14 March 1972
- Premier: Angus Bethune
- Preceded by: Roy Fagan
- Succeeded by: Merv Everett

18th Speaker of the Tasmanian House of Assembly
- In office 29 October 1956 – 1 June 1959
- Preceded by: Horace Strutt
- Succeeded by: Charley Aylett

Member of the Tasmanian House of Assembly for Braddon (Darwin until 1956)
- In office 21 August 1948 – 22 April 1972

Personal details
- Born: Kevin Orchard Lyons; 7 February 1923 Hobart, Tasmania, Australia
- Died: 24 May 2000 (aged 77) Melbourne, Victoria, Australia
- Party: Centre Party (1969–1972)
- Other political affiliations: Liberal Party (1948–1966); Independent (1966–1969)
- Relations: Joseph Lyons (father); Enid Burnell (mother); Brendan Lyons (brother); Kevin Lyons Jr. (son)

Kevin Orchard Lyons (7 February 1923 – 24 May 2000) was an Australian politician and member of the Tasmanian House of Assembly representing the seat of Darwin (later renamed Braddon).

== Biography ==
=== Early life ===
Born in 1923 in Hobart, he was the son of Joseph Lyons (who would go on to become Premier of Tasmania and later Prime Minister of Australia) and Enid Lyons (who would become the first woman elected to the Australian House of Representatives), and brother of Tasmanian politician Brendan Lyons.

=== Political career ===
Lyons was elected to the House of Assembly for the Liberal Party on 21 August 1948, and from 29 October 1956 to 1 June 1959 was Speaker of the House.

On 7 September 1966, Lyons resigned from the Liberal Party after a dispute arose over preselection for the upcoming election. He sat as an independent until 1969, when he pulled together the remains of the Tasmania division of the Country Party under the new name of the Centre Party, with himself as leader. He then ran for election under the Centre Party banner, retaining his seat of Braddon. The 1969 election resulted in a hung parliament, with Lyons' Centre Party holding the balance of power. Lyons agreed to form a coalition government with the Liberals, and was appointed Deputy Premier under Angus Bethune as Premier. Lyons dissolved the coalition in 1972, and was subsequently critical of Bethune, who lost the 1972 election to Labor's Eric Reece.

=== Death ===
Lyons died in Melbourne on 24 May 2000. A condolence motion was read in the House the next day.

His son Kevin Lyons Jr. was appointed to the Supreme Court of Victoria in 2018.

== Role in gambling in Tasmania ==
In his book, Losing Streak, published in 2017, historian James Boyce alleges that Lyons accepted the position of Deputy Premier in order to ensure his vote on the establishment of the casino at Wrest Point.

He then quit parliament, triggering a new election, which was won by the Labor Party. After quitting he was offered a huge amount ($250,000 in today's money) by Federal Hotels and British Tobacco as an advance for a book that was never written. He also set up a public relations company, even though he had no experience in it, and his first and primary client was Federal Hotels. In Federal Hotels' case, the motive is suggested to have been the protection of its casino monopoly in Tasmania.

The outcome of the election that was triggered in 1972 ultimately led to the creation of the second casino in Launceston, and the introduction of poker machines into the casinos, and then the spreading of pokies into pubs and clubs. It also had a hand in handing the monopoly of these machines to the Federal Group.

== See also ==
- Federal Hotels
- 1968 Tasmanian referendum

Tasmanian House of Assembly
Preceded by Horace Strutt	Speaker of the Tasmanian House of Assembly; 1956–1959	Succeeded by Charley Aylett
Political offices
Preceded by Roy Fagan	Deputy Premier of Tasmania; 1969–1972	Succeeded by Merv Everett
