= Workplace Gender Equality Agency =

Australian Government statutory agency

- Workplace Gender Equality Agency logo

Agency overview
- Formed: 6 December 2012
- Jurisdiction: Australia
- Headquarters: 309 Kent Street, Sydney
- Minister responsible: Katy Gallagher, Minister for Women
- Agency executive: Christine Castley, CEO
- Parent department: Department of the Prime Minister and Cabinet
- Key document: Workplace Gender Equality Act 2012
- Website: wgea.gov.au

The Workplace Gender Equality Agency (WGEA) is an Australian Government statutory agency responsible for promoting and improving gender equality in Australian workplaces.

== History ==
The agency was created by the Workplace Gender Equality Act 2012 on 6 November 2012. It provides employers with advice, practical tools, and education to help them improve gender equality. The Workplace Gender Equality Act 2012 was enacted by an amendment to the Equal Opportunity for Women in the Workplace Act 1999, that changed its name to the Workplace Gender Equality Act and correspondingly changed the name of the Equality Opportunity for Women in the Workplace Agency to the Workplace Gender Equality Agency.

== Governance ==
The Workplace Gender Equality Agency is part of the Department of the Prime Minister and Cabinet. As of November 2026 it is part of the portfolio of Katy Gallagher, Minister for Women.

As of November 2026 Christine Castley is the chief executive officer of the WGEA.

== Activities ==
Australian employers with 100 or more staff are required to report to the agency annually, between 1 April and 31 May, against six gender equality indicators:

1. Gender composition of the workforce
2. Gender composition of governing bodies of relevant employers
3. Equal remuneration between women and men
4. Availability and utility of employment terms, conditions and practices relating to flexible working arrangements for employees and to working arrangements supporting employees with family or caring responsibilities
5. Consultation with employees on issues concerning gender equality in the workplace
6. Any other matters specified by the Minister: sex-based harassment and discrimination

Following legislative amendments in 2025, employers with 500 or more employees must also select and meet or demonstrate progress against gender equality targets.

The WGEA uses the data to develop confidential and customised Executive Summary and Industry Benchmark Report for employers, which enables them to compare their performance to their peers.

The WGEA dataset covers nearly 10,000 employers and more than 6 million employees in the private and Commonwealth public sectors. It provides a detailed insight into the state of gender equality in Australian workplaces at a national, industry, sector and employer level. This data is publicly available and searchable on the WGEA Data Explorer.

On 27 February 2024 WGEA published private sector employer gender pay gaps for the first time following amendments to the Workplace Gender Equality Act 2012. It revealed that many of the companies and brands that are popular in Australia have substantial gender pay gaps.

== Key statistics ==
The following statistics were sourced from WGEA's 2026 dataset:

- Australia's gender pay gap is 19.7%. Over the course of a year women earn $27,467 less, on average, than men.
- 24% of CEOs are women
- 44% of managers are women
- 34% of board members are women
- 23% of boards have no women members
- 29% of women and 12% of men work part-time
- 7% of management positions are part-time
- 67% of employers conducted a gender pay gap analysis
- 66% of employers offer paid parental leave
- 21% of employees taking parental leave are men
- 73% of employers consult employees on gender equality
- 88% of employers have a policy to support employees experiencing family and domestic violence
- 99.3% of employers have a policy to prevent and respond to sexual harassment
- 27% of employers do not identify workplace and industry specific risks of sexual harassment.
