= Members of the Tasmanian Legislative Council, 1963–1969 =

This is a list of members of the Tasmanian Legislative Council between 1963 and 1969. Terms of the Legislative Council did not coincide with Legislative Assembly elections, and members served six year terms, with a number of members facing election each year.

== Elections ==
Date	Electorates
11 May 1963	Monmouth; Newdegate, Russell
9 May 1964	Hobart; Launceston; Gordon
8 May 1965	Meander; Pembroke; Queenborough; West Devon
14 May 1966	Cornwall; Huon; Mersey
13 May 1967	Derwent; Tamar; Westmorland
25 May 1968	Buckingham; Macquarie; South Esk

== Members ==
Name	Division	Years in office	Elected
Hon Sir Henry Baker^{[3]}	Queenborough	1948–1968	1965
Hon Phyllis Benjamin (Labor)	Hobart	1952–1976	1964
Hon Charles Best	Meander	1958–1971	1965
Hon Louis Bisdee	Monmouth	1959–1981	1963
Hon Ron Brown	Huon	1948–1966	1960
Hon Alby Broadby^{[2]}	Gordon	1968–1988	b/e
Hon Lloyd Carins	South Esk	1962–1980	1968
Hon Thomas Cheek	Macquarie	1950–1968	1962
Hon James Bell Connolly (Labor)	Buckingham	1948–1968	1962
Hon Thomas d'Alton^{[2]} (Labor)	Gordon	1947–1968	1964
Hon Walter Davis	West Devon	1953–1971	1965
Hon Joseph Dixon	Derwent	1955–1961; 1967–1979	1967
Hon Charles Fenton	Russell	1957–1981	1963
Hon Geoffrey Foot	Cornwall	1961–1972	1966
Hon William Fry^{[1]}	Launceston	1958–1965	1964
Hon Oliver Gregory	Westmorland	1959–1985	1967
Hon Daniel Hitchcock (Liberal)	Tamar	1960–1979	1967
Hon Michael Hodgman	Huon	1966–1974	1966
Hon Ken Lowrie	Macquarie	1968–1986	1968
Hon Hector McFie	Mersey	1954–1972	1966
Hon Ben McKay	Pembroke	1959–1976	1965
Hon Don Marriott (Labor)	Derwent	1961–1967	1961
Hon Brian Miller (Labor)	Newdegate	1957–1986	1963
Hon John Orchard^{[1]}^{[4]}	Launceston	1954–1961; 1966–1968	b/e
Hon George Shaw	Buckingham	1968–1998	1968
Hon Ray Shipp^{[4]}	Launceston	1968–1982	b/e
Hon Louis Shoobridge^{[3]}	Queenborough	1968–1971	b/e

== Notes ==
^{1} On 19 December 1965, William Fry, the member for Launceston, died. John Orchard won the resulting by-election on 29 January 1966.
^{2} On 7 May 1968, Thomas d'Alton, the Labor member for Gordon, died. Alby Broadby won the resulting by-election on 26 June 1968.
^{3} On 20 July 1968, Sir Henry Baker, the member for Queenborough, died. Louis Shoobridge won the resulting by-election on 28 September 1968, which was contested by 13 candidates — a record for the Legislative Council.
^{4} In late 1968, John Orchard, the member for Launceston, was forced to vacate his seat under the Constitution (Disqualification Removal) Act 1968 due to his having been engaged in a contract with the government in his business affairs. Ray Shipp won the resulting by-election on 21 December 1968.

== Sources ==
- Hughes, Colin A.; Aitkin, Don (1986). Voting for the Australian State Upper Houses, 1890-1984. Canberra: Australian National University. ISBN 0-9097-7918-X.
- Parliament of Tasmania (2006). The Parliament of Tasmania from 1856
