= Members of the Tasmanian Legislative Council, 1945–1951 =

This is a list of members of the Tasmanian Legislative Council between 1945 and 1951. Terms of the Legislative Council did not coincide with Legislative Assembly elections, and members served six year terms, with a number of members facing election each year.

A major redistribution in 1946 resulted in the multi-member divisions of Hobart and Launceston being split up—the old divisions remained as single-member divisions, whilst Hobart spawned Newdegate and Queenborough, and Launceston spawned Cornwall. A new division of West Devon was created from rural areas of Mersey, whilst Cambridge combined with parts of Macquarie to form the new Monmouth.

== Elections ==
Date	Electorates
8 May 1945	Cambridge (Monmouth); Hobart (Newdegate), Russell
7 May 1946	Hobart; Launceston; Gordon
10 May 1947	Meander; Pembroke; Queenborough; West Devon
8 May 1948	Cornwall; Huon; Mersey
14 May 1949	Derwent; Tamar; Westmorland
13 May 1950	Buckingham; Macquarie; South Esk

== Members ==
Name	Division	Years in office	Elected
Hon Compton Archer	Macquarie	1944–1950	1944
Hon Henry Baker^{[4]}	Queenborough (Hobart)	1948–1968	b/e
Hon Archibald Blacklow	Pembroke	1936–1953	1947
Hon Ron Brown	Huon	1948–1966	1948
Hon Thomas Cheek	Macquarie	1950–1968	1950
Hon James Bell Connolly^{[5]} (Labor)	Buckingham	1948–1968	1950
Hon Arthur Cutts	Tamar	1937–1955	1949
Hon Thomas d'Alton^{[3]} (Labor)	Gordon	1947–1968	b/e
Hon Joe Darling^{[2]}	Cambridge	1921–1946	1945
Hon Charles Eady^{[1]}	Hobart	1925–1945	1940
Hon Arthur Fenton	Russell	1933–1957	1945
Hon George Flowers	Westmorland	1942–1958	1949
Hon Geoffrey Green^{[2]}	Cambridge/Monmouth	1946–1959	b/e
Hon Richard Green^{[7]}	Launceston	1946–1950	1946
Hon Dr Arthur Grounds^{[7]} (Labor)	Launceston	1950–1951	b/e
Hon Alexander Lillico	Mersey	1924–1954	1948
Hon Elliot Lillico	Meander	1943–1958	1947
Hon Dennis Lonergan	Newdegate (Hobart)	1945–1951	1945
Hon James McDonald^{[3]} (Labor)	Gordon	1916–1922; 1928–1947	1946
Hon George McElwee (Labor)	Launceston	1940–1946	1940
Hon Margaret McIntyre^{[6]}	Cornwall (Launceston)	1948	1948
Hon Leslie Procter	South Esk	1939–1962	1950
Hon Ernest Record^{[6]}	Cornwall (Launceston)	1948–1954	b/e
Hon William Robinson	Cornwall (Launceston)	1942–1948	1942
Hon (Sir) Rupert Shoobridge	Derwent	1937–1955	1949
Hon John Soundy	Hobart	1946–1952	1946
Hon William Strutt^{[4]}	Queenborough (Hobart)	1938–1948	1947
Hon Arthur Tattersall	West Devon	1947–1953	1947
Hon Bill Wedd^{[5]}	Buckingham	1944–1948	1944
Hon Rowland Worsley (Labor)	Huon	1942–1948	1942

== Notes ==
^{1} On 20 December 1945, Charles Eady, the member for Hobart, died. The seat was not filled as the term was due to be filled at the 1946 elections.
^{2} On 2 January 1946, Joe Darling, the member for Cambridge, died. Geoffrey Green won the resulting by-election on 23 February 1946.
^{3} On 17 October 1947, James McDonald, the Labor member for Gordon, died. Labor candidate Thomas d'Alton won the resulting by-election on 22 November 1947.
^{4} On 5 March 1948, William Strutt, the member for Queenborough, died. Henry Baker won the resulting by-election on 8 May 1948.
^{5} On 2 August 1948, Bill Wedd, the member for Buckingham, resigned to contest one of the Denison seats in the August 1948 House of Assembly election. Labor candidate James Bell Connolly won the resulting by-election. This was the first occasion on which a Labor candidate had won a non-Labor-held seat at a Legislative Council by-election.
^{6} On 2 September 1948, Margaret McIntyre, the member for Cornwall and the first woman elected to the Legislative Council, died four months into her term. Ernest Record won the resulting by-election on 16 October 1948.
^{7} In April 1950, Richard Green, the member for Launceston, resigned to become a judge of the Supreme Court of Tasmania. Labor candidate Arthur Grounds won the resulting by-election on 13 May 1950.

== Sources ==
- Hughes, Colin A.; Aitkin, Don (1986). Voting for the Australian State Upper Houses, 1890-1984. Canberra: Australian National University. ISBN 0-9097-7918-X.
- Parliament of Tasmania (2006). The Parliament of Tasmania from 1856
