= Members of the Tasmanian Legislative Council, 1957–1963 =

This is a list of members of the Tasmanian Legislative Council between 1957 and 1963. Terms of the Legislative Council did not coincide with Legislative Assembly elections, and members served six year terms, with a number of members facing election each year.

== Elections ==
Date	Electorates
11 May 1957	Monmouth; Newdegate, Russell
10 May 1958	Hobart; Launceston; Gordon
9 May 1959	Meander; Pembroke; Queenborough; West Devon
14 May 1960	Cornwall; Huon; Mersey
13 May 1961	Derwent; Tamar; Westmorland
12 May 1962	Buckingham; Macquarie; South Esk

== Members ==
Name	Division	Years in office	Elected
Hon (Sir) Henry Baker	Queenborough	1948–1968	1959
Hon Phyllis Benjamin (Labor)	Hobart	1952–1976	1958
Hon Charles Best^{[1]}	Meander	1958–1971	1959
Hon Louis Bisdee^{[3]}	Monmouth	1959–1981	1963
Hon Ron Brown	Huon	1948–1966	1960
Hon Lloyd Carins	South Esk	1962–1980	1962
Hon Thomas Cheek	Macquarie	1950–1968	1962
Hon James Bell Connolly (Labor)	Buckingham	1948–1968	1962
Hon Neil Campbell^{[4]} (Liberal)	Tamar	1955–1960	1955
Hon Thomas d'Alton (Labor)	Gordon	1947–1968	1958
Hon Walter Davis	West Devon	1953–1971	1959
Hon Joseph Dixon	Derwent	1955–1961; 1967–1979	1955
Hon William Dunbabin	Pembroke	1953–1959	1953
Hon Charles Fenton	Russell	1957–1981	1957
Hon George Flowers^{[2]}	Westmorland	1942–1958	1955
Hon Geoffrey Foot^{[5]}	Cornwall	1961–1972	b/e
Hon William Fry	Launceston	1958–1965	1958
Hon Geoffrey Green^{[3]}	Monmouth	1946–1959	1957
Hon Oliver Gregory^{[2]}	Westmorland	1959–1985	1961
Hon Lucy Grounds (Labor)	Launceston	1951–1958	1952
Hon Daniel Hitchcock^{[4]} (Liberal)	Tamar	1960–1979	b/e
Hon Elliot Lillico^{[1]}	Meander	1943–1958	1953
Hon Hector McFie	Mersey	1954–1972	1960
Hon Ben McKay	Pembroke	1959–1976	1959
Hon Don Marriott (Labor)	Derwent	1961–1967	1961
Hon Brian Miller (Labor)	Newdegate	1957–1986	1957
Hon John Orchard^{[5]}	Cornwall	1954–1961; 1966–1968	1960
Hon Leslie Procter	South Esk	1939–1962	1956

== Notes ==
^{1} In November 1958, Elliot Lillico, the member for Meander, resigned. Charles Best won the resulting by-election on 6 December 1958.
^{2} On 7 December 1958, George Flowers, the member for Westmorland, died. Oliver Gregory won the resulting by-election on 14 February 1959.
^{3} On 21 April 1959, Geoffrey Green, the member for Monmouth, died. Louis Bisdee won the resulting by-election on 4 July 1959.
^{4} On 25 April 1960, Neil Campbell, the member for Tamar, died. Liberal candidate Daniel Hitchcock won the resulting by-election on 9 July 1960.
^{5} In November 1961, John Orchard, the member for Cornwall, resigned. Geoffrey Foot won the resulting by-election on 10 December 1961.

== Sources ==
- Hughes, Colin A.; Aitkin, Don (1986). Voting for the Australian State Upper Houses, 1890-1984. Canberra: Australian National University. ISBN 0-9097-7918-X.
- Parliament of Tasmania (2006). The Parliament of Tasmania from 1856
