= Members of the Tasmanian Legislative Council, 1951–1957 =

This is a list of members of the Tasmanian Legislative Council between 1951 and 1957. Terms of the Legislative Council did not coincide with Legislative Assembly elections, and members served six year terms, with a number of members facing election each year.

== Elections ==
Date	Electorates
12 May 1951	Monmouth; Newdegate, Russell
10 May 1952	Hobart; Launceston; Gordon
2 May 1953	Meander; Pembroke; Queenborough; West Devon
8 May 1954	Cornwall; Huon; Mersey
14 May 1955	Derwent; Tamar; Westmorland
12 May 1956	Buckingham; Macquarie; South Esk

== Members ==
Name	Division	Years in office	Elected
Hon Henry Baker	Queenborough	1948–1968	1953
Hon Phyllis Benjamin (Labor)	Hobart	1952–1976	1952
Hon Archibald Blacklow	Pembroke	1936–1953	1947
Hon Ron Brown	Huon	1948–1966	1954
Hon Thomas Cheek	Macquarie	1950–1968	1956
Hon James Bell Connolly (Labor)	Buckingham	1948–1968	1956
Hon Neil Campbell	Tamar	1955–1960	1955
Hon Arthur Cutts	Tamar	1937–1955	1949
Hon Thomas d'Alton (Labor)	Gordon	1947–1968	1952
Hon Walter Davis	West Devon	1953–1971	1953
Hon Joseph Dixon	Derwent	1955–1961; 1967–1979	1955
Hon William Dunbabin	Pembroke	1953–1959	1953
Hon Arthur Fenton	Russell	1933–1957	1951
Hon George Flowers	Westmorland	1942–1958	1955
Hon George Gray	Newdegate	1951–1957	1951
Hon Geoffrey Green	Monmouth	1946–1959	1951
Hon Dr Arthur Grounds^{[1]} (Labor)	Launceston	1950–1951	b/e
Hon Lucy Grounds^{[1]} (Labor)	Launceston	1951–1958	1952
Hon Mervyn Lakin^{[2]}	Mersey	1954	1954
Hon Alexander Lillico	Mersey	1924–1954	1948
Hon Elliot Lillico	Meander	1943–1958	1953
Hon Hector McFie^{[2]}	Mersey	1954–1972	b/e
Hon John Orchard	Cornwall	1954–1961; 1966–1968	1954
Hon Leslie Procter	South Esk	1939–1962	1956
Hon Ernest Record	Cornwall	1948–1954	b/e
Hon Sir Rupert Shoobridge	Derwent	1937–1955	1949
Hon John Soundy	Hobart	1946–1952	1946
Hon Arthur Tattersall	West Devon	1947–1953	1947

== Notes ==
^{1} On 29 July 1951, Arthur Grounds, the Labor member for Launceston, died. His widow Lucy Grounds won the resulting by-election on 29 September 1951.
^{2} On 19 June 1954, Mervyn Lakin, the member for Mersey, died just 1 month and 11 days after being elected, becoming one of the shortest serving members in the Council's history. Hector McFie won the resulting by-election on 4 September 1954.

== Sources ==
- Hughes, Colin A.; Aitkin, Don (1986). Voting for the Australian State Upper Houses, 1890-1984. Canberra: Australian National University. ISBN 0-9097-7918-X.
- Parliament of Tasmania (2006). The Parliament of Tasmania from 1856
