= Members of the Tasmanian Legislative Council, 1993–1999 =

This is a list of members of the Tasmanian Legislative Council between 1993 and 1999. Terms of the Legislative Council did not coincide with Legislative Assembly elections, and members served six year terms, with a number of members facing election each year.

During this period, legislation was passed to reduce the Council from 19 to 15 seats. It was the most major change in the Council's makeup since 1870. 15 of the members were appointed to new seats in 1999.

== Elections ==
Date	Electorates
22 May 1993	Monmouth; Newdegate, Russell
28 May 1994	Hobart; Launceston; Gordon
27 May 1995	Tamar; Pembroke; Queenborough; West Devon
25 May 1996	Cornwall; Huon; Mersey
31 May 1997	Derwent; Meander; Westmorland
23 May 1998	Buckingham; Macquarie; South Esk

== Members ==
Name	Division	Years in office	Elected
Hon Michael Aird^{[1]} (Labor)	Derwent	1995–2011	1997
Hon Russell Anderson	Macquarie	1998–1999	1998
Hon Ray Bailey	Cornwall	1990–2002	1996
Hon Charles Batt^{[1]} (Labor)	Derwent	1979–1995	1991
Hon George Brookes	Westmorland	1991–1997	1991
Hon Dr David Crean (Labor)	Buckingham	1992–2004	1998
Hon Tony Fletcher	Russell	1981–2005	1993
Hon Ross Ginn^{[2]}	Newdegate	1986–1998	1993
Hon Paul Harriss	Huon	1996–2014	1996
Hon Des Hiscutt	West Devon/Emu Bay	1995–1999	1995
Hon Hugh Hiscutt	West Devon	1983–1995	1989
Hon Reg Hope	Meander	1979–1997	1991
Hon John Loone	Tamar/Roland	1989–2001	1995
Hon Peter McKay	Pembroke	1976–1999	1995
Hon Athol Meyer	Huon	1986–1996	1990
Hon Jean Moore	Hobart	1992–1994	b/e
Hon Doug Parkinson (Labor)	Hobart	1994–2012	1994
Hon Colin Rattray	South Esk	1992–2004	1998
Hon Peter Schulze	Gordon	1988–1999	1994
Hon George Shaw	Macquarie	1968–1998	1992
Hon Silvia Smith (Ind. Labor)	Westmorland	1997–2003	1997
Hon Sue Smith	Leven	1997–2013	1997
Hon Geoff Squibb	Mersey	1990–2003	1996, 1997
Hon John Stopp	Queenborough	1983–1998	1989
Hon John White^{[2]}	Newdegate	1998–1999	b/e
Hon Jim Wilkinson	Queenborough	1995–2019	1995
Hon Stephen Wilson	Monmouth	1981–1999	1993
Hon Don Wing	Launceston	1982–2011	1994

== Transition arrangements ==
Name	Old division	New division
Michael Aird (Labor)	Derwent	Derwent
Russell Anderson	Macquarie	(Seat abolished.)
Ray Bailey	Cornwall	Rosevears
David Crean (Labor)	Buckingham	Elwick
Tony Fletcher	Russell	Murchison
Paul Harriss	Huon	Huon
Des Hiscutt	Emu Bay (West Devon)	(Seat abolished.)
John Loone	Roland (Tamar)	Rowallan
Peter McKay	Pembroke	Pembroke
Doug Parkinson (Labor)	Hobart	Wellington
Colin Rattray	South Esk	Apsley
Peter Schulze	Gordon	(Seat abolished.)
Silvia Smith	Westmorland	Windermere
Sue Smith	Leven (Mersey)	Montgomery
Geoff Squibb	Mersey (Meander)	Mersey
John White	Newdegate	(Seat abolished.)
Jim Wilkinson	Queenborough	Nelson
Stephen Wilson	Monmouth	Rumney
Don Wing	Launceston	Paterson

== Notes ==
^{1} In April 1995, Charles Batt, the Labor member for Derwent, retired. Labor candidate Michael Aird won the resulting by-election on 27 May 1995.
^{2} On 6 July 1998, Ross Ginn, the member for Newdegate, resigned due to ill health. Labor candidate John White won the resulting by-election on 19 September 1998.

== Sources ==
- Parliament of Tasmania (2006). The Parliament of Tasmania from 1856
