= Members of the Tasmanian Legislative Council, 1969–1975 =

This is a list of members of the Tasmanian Legislative Council between 1969 and 1975. Terms of the Legislative Council did not coincide with Legislative Assembly elections, and members served six year terms, with a number of members facing election each year.

== Elections ==
| Date | Electorates |
|---|---|
| 24 May 1969 | Monmouth; Newdegate, Russell |
| 23 May 1970 | Hobart; Launceston; Gordon |
| 22 May 1971 | Meander; Pembroke; Queenborough; West Devon |
| 3 May 1972 | Cornwall; Huon; Mersey |
| 26 May 1973 | Derwent; Tamar; Westmorland |
| 25 May 1974 | Buckingham; Macquarie; South Esk |

== Members ==
| Name | Division | Years in office | Elected |
|---|---|---|---|
| Hon Phyllis Benjamin (Labor) | Hobart | 1952–1976 | 1970 |
| Hon Charles Best | Meander | 1958–1971 | 1965 |
| Hon Louis Bisdee | Monmouth | 1959–1981 | 1969 |
| Hon Harry Braid | Mersey | 1972–1990 | 1972 |
| Hon Alby Broadby | Gordon | 1968–1988 | 1970 |
| Hon Lloyd Carins | South Esk | 1962–1980 | 1974 |
| Hon Jeff Coates | Meander | 1971–1989 | 1971 |
| Hon Walter Davis^{[1]} | West Devon | 1953–1971 | 1971 |
| Hon Joseph Dixon | Derwent | 1955–1961; 1967–1979 | 1973 |
| Hon Charles Fenton | Russell | 1957–1981 | 1969 |
| Hon Geoffrey Foot | Cornwall | 1961–1972 | 1966 |
| Hon Oliver Gregory | Westmorland | 1959–1985 | 1973 |
| Hon Daniel Hitchcock (Liberal) | Tamar | 1960–1979 | 1973 |
| Hon Bill Hodgman | Queenborough | 1971–1983 | b/e |
| Hon Michael Hodgman^{[2]} | Huon | 1966–1974 | 1972 |
| Hon Peter Hodgman^{[2]} | Huon | 1974–1986 | b/e |
| Hon Frank King | Cornwall | 1972–1978 | 1972 |
| Hon Ken Lowrie | Macquarie | 1968–1986 | 1974 |
| Hon Hector McFie | Mersey | 1954–1972 | 1966 |
| Hon Ben McKay | Pembroke | 1959–1976 | 1971 |
| Hon Brian Miller (Labor) | Newdegate | 1957–1986 | 1969 |
| Hon George Shaw | Buckingham | 1968–1998 | 1974 |
| Hon Ray Shipp | Launceston | 1968–1982 | 1970 |
| Hon Louis Shoobridge | Queenborough | 1968–1971 | b/e |
| Hon William Young^{[1]} | West Devon | 1971–1983 | b/e |

== Notes ==
^{1} On 7 October 1971, Walter Davis, the member for West Devon, died. William Young won the resulting by-election on 11 December 1971.
^{2} In April 1974, Michael Hodgman, the member for Huon, resigned to contest the seat of Denison in the Australian House of Representatives. His brother Peter Hodgman won the resulting by-election on 25 May 1974.

== Sources ==
- Hughes, Colin A.; Aitkin, Don (1986). Voting for the Australian State Upper Houses, 1890-1984. Canberra: Australian National University. ISBN 0-9097-7918-X.
- Parliament of Tasmania (2006). The Parliament of Tasmania from 1856
