= Members of the Tasmanian Legislative Council, 1975–1981 =

This is a list of members of the Tasmanian Legislative Council between 1975 and 1981. Terms of the Legislative Council did not coincide with Legislative Assembly elections, and members served six year terms, with a number of members facing election each year.

== Elections ==
Date	Electorates
24 May 1975	Monmouth; Newdegate, Russell
22 May 1976	Hobart; Launceston; Gordon
28 May 1977	Meander; Pembroke; Queenborough; West Devon
27 May 1978	Cornwall; Huon; Mersey
26 May 1979	Derwent; Tamar; Westmorland
24 May 1980	Buckingham; Macquarie; South Esk

== Members ==
Name	Division	Years in office	Elected
Hon Dick Archer	South Esk	1980–1992	1980
Hon Charles Batt (Labor)	Derwent	1979–1995	1979
Hon Phyllis Benjamin (Labor)	Hobart	1952–1976	1970
Hon Louis Bisdee	Monmouth	1959–1981	1975
Hon Harry Braid	Mersey	1972–1990	1978
Hon Alby Broadby	Gordon	1968–1988	1976
Hon Lloyd Carins	South Esk	1962–1980	1974
Hon Jeff Coates	Meander	1971–1989	1977
Hon Joseph Dixon	Derwent	1955–1961; 1967–1979	1973
Hon Charles Fenton	Russell	1957–1981	1975
Hon Oliver Gregory	Westmorland	1959–1985	1979
Hon Daniel Hitchcock (Liberal)	Tamar	1960–1979	1973
Hon Bill Hodgman	Queenborough	1971–1983	1977
Hon Peter Hodgman	Huon	1974–1986	1978
Hon Reg Hope	Tamar	1979–1997	1979
Hon Frank King	Cornwall	1972–1978	1972
Hon Mac Le Fevre	Cornwall	1978–1984	1978
Hon Ken Lowrie	Macquarie	1968–1986	1980
Hon Ben McKay^{[1]}	Pembroke	1959–1976	1971
Hon Peter McKay^{[1]}	Pembroke	1976–1999	1977
Hon Brian Miller (Labor)	Newdegate	1957–1986	1975
Hon George Shaw	Buckingham	1968–1998	1980
Hon Ray Shipp	Launceston	1968–1982	1976
Hon Kath Venn (Labor)	Hobart	1976–1982	1976
Hon William Young	West Devon	1971–1983	1977

== Notes ==
^{1} On 11 July 1976, Ben McKay, the member for Pembroke, died. His son Peter McKay won the resulting by-election on 2 October 1976.

== Sources ==
- Hughes, Colin A.; Aitkin, Don (1986). Voting for the Australian State Upper Houses, 1890-1984. Canberra: Australian National University. ISBN 0-9097-7918-X.
- Parliament of Tasmania (2006). The Parliament of Tasmania from 1856
