= Members of the Tasmanian Legislative Council, 1903–1909 =

This is a list of the members of the Tasmanian Legislative Council between 1903 and 1909. The terms of the Legislative Council did not coincide with Legislative Assembly elections, and members served six year terms, with a number of members facing election each year.

== Elections ==
| Date | Electorates |
|---|---|
| 5 May 1903 | Buckingham; Macquarie; South Esk; Cambridge; Hobart (1); Russell |
| 3 May 1904 | Hobart (1); Launceston (1) |
| 2 May 1905 | Hobart (1); Gordon; Meander, Pembroke |
| 8 May 1906 | Huon; Launceston (1); Mersey |
| 7 May 1907 | Derwent; Tamar; Westmorland |

== Members ==
| Name | Division | Years in office | Elected |
|---|---|---|---|
| Hon Dr Gamaliel Butler | Hobart | 1896–1914 | 1904 |
| Hon John Cheek | Westmorland | 1907–1913; 1919–1942 | 1907 |
| Hon George Collins | Tamar | 1895–1919 | 1907 |
| Hon William Crosby | Hobart | 1885–1909 | 1903 |
| Hon Charles Davies | Cambridge | 1897–1921 | 1903 |
| Hon Ellis Dean | Derwent | 1901–1920 | 1907 |
| Hon William Dodery | Westmorland | 1877–1907 | 1901 |
| Hon Sir Adye Douglas | Launceston | 1855–1856; 1884–1886; 1890–1904 | 1898 |
| Hon Thomas Fisher^{[2]} | Huon | 1905–1909 | 1906 |
| Hon Tetley Gant | Buckingham | 1901–1927 | 1903 |
| Hon William Gibson^{[3]} | Hobart | 1901–1905 | 1905 |
| Hon Frederick Grubb | Meander | 1879–1911 | 1905 |
| Hon William Hart^{[1]} | Launceston | 1885–1904 | 1900 |
| Hon Peter McCrackan | Launceston | 1904–1916 | 1904 |
| Hon William Moore | Russell | 1877–1909 | 1903 |
| Hon Arthur Morrisby | Gordon | 1899–1916 | 1905 |
| Hon James Murdoch (senior) | Pembroke | 1903–1925 | 1905 |
| Hon Hubert Nichols | Mersey | 1902–1924; 1926–1935 | 1906 |
| Hon Alfred Page | Macquarie | 1887–1909 | 1903 |
| Hon William Propsting^{[3]} | Hobart | 1905–1937 | b/e |
| Hon Charles Russen^{[1]} | Launceston | 1904–1914 | 1906 |
| Hon Robert Scott | South Esk | 1899–1909 | 1903 |
| Hon John Watchorn^{[2]} | Huon | 1882–1905 | 1900 |

== Notes ==
^{1} On 7 February 1904, William Hart, one of the two members for Launceston, died. Charles Russen won the resulting by-election on 3 May 1904.
^{2} On 4 March 1905, John Watchorn, the member for Huon, died. Thomas Fisher won the resulting by-election on 2 May 1905.
^{3} On 29 November 1905, William Gibson, one of the three members for Hobart, died. William Propsting won the resulting by-election on 22 December 1905.

== Sources ==
- Hughes, Colin A.; Aitkin, Don (1986). Voting for the Australian State Upper Houses, 1890-1984. Canberra: Australian National University. ISBN 0-9097-7918-X.
- Parliament of Tasmania (2006). The Parliament of Tasmania from 1856
