= Electoral results for the Division of Derwent =

This is a list of electoral results for the electoral division of Derwent in Tasmanian Legislative Council elections since 2005, when candidate political affiliations were first recorded in the official record.

== Members ==
Member	Party	Term
William Langdon	Independent	1856–1871
Walter Gellibrand	Independent	1871–1901
Ellis Dean	Independent	1901–1920
Louis Shoobridge	Independent	1921–1937
(Sir) Rupert Shoobridge	Independent	1937–1955
Joseph Dixon	Independent	1955–1961
Don Marriott	Labor	1961–1967
Joseph Dixon	Independent	1967–1979
Charles Batt	Labor	1979–1995
Michael Aird	Labor	1995–2011
Craig Farrell	Labor	2011–present

== Election results ==
=== Elections in the 2020s ===
==== 2021 ====
2021 Tasmanian Legislative Council periodic elections: Derwent
Party	Candidate	Votes	%	±%
Labor	Craig Farrell	10,069	49.09	−15.26
Liberal	Ben Shaw	8,385	40.88	+40.88
Animal Justice	Ivan Davis	2,059	10.04	+10.04
Total formal votes		20,513	94.4	+0.60
Informal votes		1,217	5.60	−0.60
Turnout		21,730	81.64	+1.46
Registered electors		26,618		
Two-party-preferred result
Labor	Craig Farrell	11,415	55.65	−8.69
Liberal	Ben Shaw	9,098	44.35	+44.35
Labor hold		Swing	–8.69	

=== Elections in the 2010s ===
==== 2015 ====
Tasmanian Legislative Council periodic elections, 2015: Derwent
Party	Candidate	Votes	%	±%
Labor	Craig Farrell	12,492	64.34	+25.74
Independent	Alan Baker	6,923	35.66	+35.66
Total formal votes		19,415	93.80	+0.49
Informal votes		1,283	6.20	−0.49
Turnout		20,698	80.18	−4.49
Labor hold		Swing	N/A	

==== 2011 By-Election ====
Derwent state by-election, 2011
Party	Candidate	Votes	%	±%
Labor	Craig Farrell	7,595	38.60	−13.01
Independent	Jenny Branch	3,990	20.28	−13.18
Independent	Ray Williams	3,197	16.25	+16.25
Independent	Deirdre Flint	2,943	14.96	+14.96
Greens	Phillip Bingley	1,950	9.91	−5.02
Total formal votes		19,675	93.31	−2.44
Informal votes		1,410	6.69	+2.44
Turnout		21,085	84.66	+2.60
Two-party-preferred result
Labor	Craig Farrell	11,118	56.61	N/A
Independent	Jenny Branch	8,521	43.39	N/A
Labor hold		Swing	N/A	

=== Elections in the 2000s ===
==== 2009 ====
Tasmanian Legislative Council periodic elections, 2009: Derwent
Party	Candidate	Votes	%	±%
Labor	Michael Aird	9,932	51.61	−25.67
Independent	Jenny Branch	6,438	33.46	+33.46
Greens	Susan Gunter	2,873	14.93	−7.79
Total formal votes		19,243	95.75	−2.99
Informal votes		855	4.25	+2.99
Turnout		20,098	82.06	
Labor hold		Swing		
