= Electoral results for the Division of Mersey =

This is a list of electoral results for the electoral division of Mersey in Tasmanian Legislative Council elections since 2005, when candidate political affiliations were first recorded in the official record.

== Members ==
Member	Party	Period
William Hawkes	Independent	1871–1877
William Moore	Independent	1877–1885
James Smith	Independent	1886–1888
John McCall	Independent	1888–1901
John Henry	Independent	1901–1902
Hubert Nichols	Independent	1902–1924
Alexander Lillico	Independent	1924–1954
Mervyn Lakin	Independent	1954–1954
Hector McFie	Independent	1954–1972
Harry Braid	Independent	1972–1990
Geoff Squibb	Independent	1990–2003
Norma Jamieson	Independent	2003–2009
Mike Gaffney	Independent	2009–present

== Election results ==
=== Elections in the 2020s ===
==== 2021 ====
2021 Tasmanian Legislative Council periodic election: Mersey
Party	Candidate	Votes	%	±%
Independent	Mike Gaffney	unopposed		
Independent hold		Swing		

=== Elections in the 2010s ===
==== 2015 ====
Tasmanian Legislative Council periodic elections, 2015: Mersey
Party	Candidate	Votes	%	±%
Independent	Mike Gaffney	14,690	75.30	+32.37
Independent	Vivienne Gale	4,818	24.70	+24.70
Total formal votes		19,508	96.36	−0.86
Informal votes		737	3.64	+0.86
Turnout		20,245	84.86	−1.15
Independent hold		Swing	N/A	

=== Elections in the 2000s ===
==== 2009 ====
Tasmanian Legislative Council periodic elections, 2009: Mersey
Party	Candidate	Votes	%	±%
Independent	Mike Gaffney	8,460	42.93	+42.93
Independent	Steve Martin	5,447	27.64	+12.77
Independent	Lynn Laycock	3,183	16.15	+16.15
Independent	Carolynn Jamieson	2,617	13.28	+13.28
Total formal votes		19,707	97.22	+0.00
Informal votes		564	2.88	+0.00
Turnout		20,271	86.01	−4.18
Two-party-preferred result
Independent	Mike Gaffney	11,836	60.06	+60.06
Independent	Steve Martin	7,871	39.94	+39.94
Independent hold		Swing		
