= Electoral results for the Division of Launceston =

This is a list of electoral results for the electoral division of Launceston in Tasmanian Legislative Council elections since 2008, when it was reconstituted.

== Members ==
Fifth incarnation (2008–present)
Member	Party	Period
Don Wing	Independent	2008–2011
Rosemary Armitage	Independent	2011–present

== Election results ==
=== Elections in the 2020s ===
==== 2023 ====
2023 Tasmanian Legislative Council periodic elections: Launceston
Party	Candidate	Votes	%	±%
Independent	Rosemary Armitage	15,548	78.23	+43.24
Greens	Cecily Rosol	4,327	21.77	+14.45
Total formal votes		19,875	95.12	−1.23
Informal votes		1,020	4.88	+1.23
Turnout		20,895	82.39	−1.83
Registered electors		25,361		
Independent hold				

=== Elections in the 2010s ===
==== 2017 ====
Tasmanian Legislative Council periodic elections, 2017: Launceston
Party	Candidate	Votes	%	±%
Independent	Rosemary Armitage	6,891	34.99	+3.26
Independent	Neroli Ellis	5,938	30.15	+30.15
Labor	Brian Roe	2,819	14.31	−5.42
Independent	Mark Tapsell	1,654	8.40	+8.40
Greens	Emma Anglesey	1,441	7.32	+7.32
Shooters and Fishers	Matthew Allen	952	4.83	+4.83
Total formal votes		19,695	96.35	−0.29
Informal votes		746	3.65	+0.29
Turnout		20,441	84.22	−6.87
Two-candidate-preferred result
Independent	Rosemary Armitage	10,151	52.16	−4.01
Independent	Neroli Ellis	9,312	47.84	+47.84
Independent hold		Swing	n/a	

==== 2011 ====
Tasmanian Legislative Council periodic elections, 2011: Launceston
Party	Candidate	Votes	%	±%
Liberal	Sam McQuestin	6,575	34.00	+34.00
Independent	Rosemary Armitage	6,136	31.73	+31.73
Labor	Steve Bishop	3,815	19.73	+19.73
Independent	Lou Clark	2,811	14.54	+14.54
Total formal votes		19,337	96.64	N/A
Informal votes		673	3.36	N/A
Turnout		20,010	84.47	N/A
Two-candidate-preferred result
Independent	Rosemary Armitage	10,861	56.17	+56.17
Liberal	Sam McQuestin	8,476	43.83	+43.83
Independent hold		Swing	N/A	
