= Louis Shoobridge =

Louis Shoobridge may refer to:

- Louis Shoobridge Sr. (1851–1939), Australian politician
- Louis Shoobridge Jr. (1920–2005), Australian politician, his grandson
