= Geoffrey Foot =

Geoffrey Foot may refer to

- Geoffrey Foot (politician) (1915–2009), Tasmanian politician
- Geoffrey Foot (film editor) (1915–2010), British film editor
