= International cricket in 1899 =

International cricket season

The 1899 international cricket season was from April 1899 to September 1899.

== Season overview ==
International tours
Start date	Home team	Away team	Results [Matches]			
Start date	Home team	Away team	Test	ODI	FC	LA
1 June 1899	England	Australia	0–1 [5]	—	—	—
18 August 1899	Netherlands	England	—	—	1–1 [2]	0–2 [2]
29 September 1899	Philadelphia	England	—	—	0–2 [2]	—

== June ==
=== Australia in England ===
The Ashes Test match series
No.	Date	Home captain	Away captain	Venue	Result
Test No: 60	1–3 June	W. G. Grace	Joe Darling	Trent Bridge, Nottingham	Match drawn
Test No: 61	15–17 February	Archie MacLaren	Joe Darling	Lord's, London	Australia by 10 wickets
Test No: 62	29 June–1 July	Archie MacLaren	Joe Darling	Headingley Cricket Ground, Leeds	Match drawn
Test No: 63	17–19 July	Archie MacLaren	Joe Darling	Old Trafford Cricket Ground, Manchester	Match drawn
Test No: 64	14–16 July	Archie MacLaren	Joe Darling	Kennington Oval, London	Match drawn
