= Frank Hart (politician) =

Tasmanian politician (1860–1945)

Frank Percy Hart (22 August 1860 in Launceston, Tasmania – 27 October 1945 in Launceston, Australia) was a Tasmanian politician.

In 1916 he was elected to the Tasmanian Legislative Council as the independent member for Launceston. He served until his defeat in 1940.

Tasmanian Legislative Council
Preceded by Peter McCrackan	Member for Launceston; 1916–1940; Served alongside: Shields/Evans/Robinson	Succeeded by George McElwee
