= Peter McCrackan =

Australian politician (1844–1928)

Peter McCrackan (6 October 1844 – 11 September 1928) was an Australian politician.

He was born in Hobart. In 1900 he was elected to the Tasmanian House of Assembly as the member for Launceston. The seat was abolished in 1903, and in 1904 McCrackan was elected to the Legislative Council for the equivalent Launceston seat. He held the seat until his defeat in 1916. McCrackan died in Launceston in 1928.

Tasmanian Legislative Council
Preceded by Sir Adye Douglas; William Hart	Member for Launceston; 1904–1916; Served alongside: Charles Russen/Tasman Shields	Succeeded by Frank Hart
