= Charles Russen =

Australian politician (died 1914)

Russen by David Low

Charles Russen (c. 1850 – 11 December 1914) was an English-born Australian politician.

He was elected to the Tasmanian Legislative Council in 1904 as the member for Launceston. He served until his death in 1914.

Tasmanian Legislative Council
Preceded by Sir Adye Douglas; William Hart	Member for Launceston; 1904–1914; Served alongside: Peter McCrackan	Succeeded by Tasman Shields
