= Alexander Evans (Australian politician) =

Australian politician (1881–1955)

Alexander Arthur Evans DSO MC (3 November 1881 – 3 June 1955) was an Australian politician.

He was born in Launceston. In 1936 he was elected to the Tasmanian Legislative Council as the independent member for Launceston. He served until his defeat in 1942. Evans died in 1955 in Hobart.

Tasmanian Legislative Council
Preceded by Tasman Shields	Member for Launceston; 1936–1942; Served alongside: Frank Hart/George McElwee	Succeeded by William Robinson
