= Andrew Lawson (Australian politician) =

Australian politician

Andrew Lawson (1873 – ?) was an Australian politician. He was born in Bendigo, Victoria. In 1922 he was elected to the Tasmanian Legislative Council as the Independent member for Gordon, serving until his defeat in 1928. He was the representative in the Legislative Council of the Australian Labor Party government led by Joseph Lyons until its defeat in 1928. He stood as a Senate candidate for the Nationalist Party at the 1928 federal election but was not elected.

Tasmanian Legislative Council
Preceded by James McDonald	Member for Gordon; 1922–1928	Succeeded by James McDonald
