= 1941 Tasmanian state election =

State election in Australia

- 13 December 1941

All 30 seats to the House of Assembly
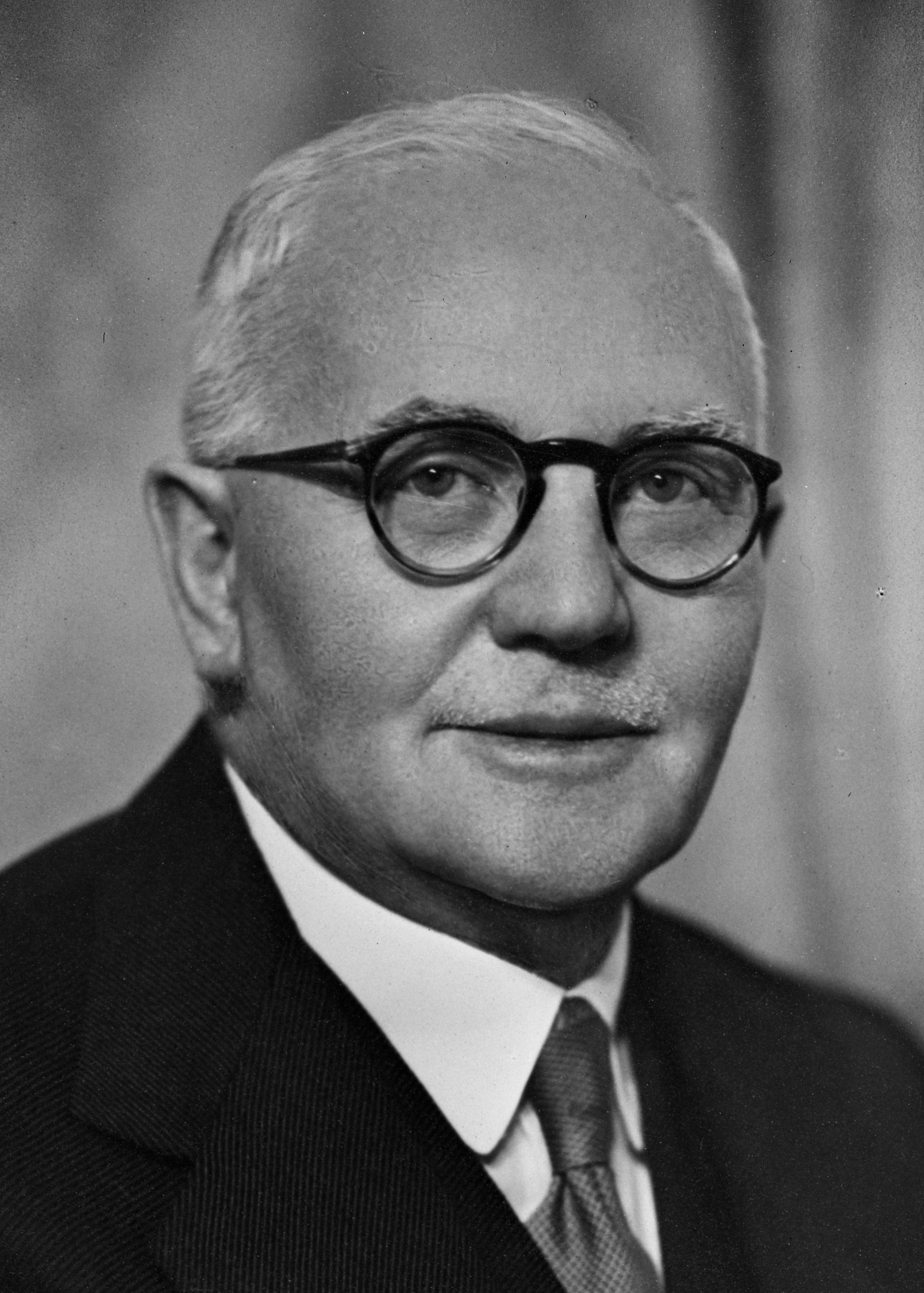

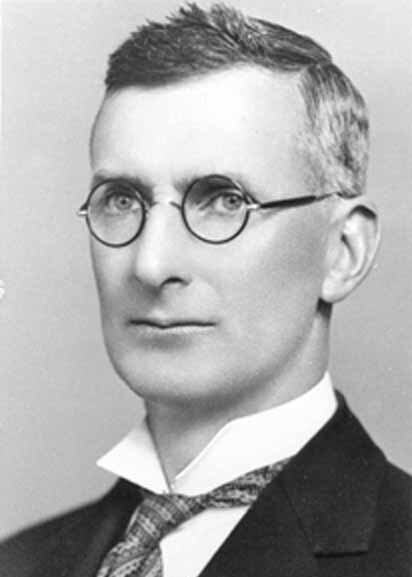
| | First party | Second party |
|---|---|---|
| Leader | Robert Cosgrove | Henry Baker |
| Party | Labor | Nationalist |
| Leader since | 18 December 1939 | 8 May 1936 |
| Leader's seat | Denison | Franklin |
| Last election | 18 seats | 12 seats |
| Seats won | 20 seats | 10 seats |
| Seat change | ▲2 | ▼2 |
| Percentage | 62.59% | 36.58% |
| Swing | ▲3.92 | ▼2.28 |
- Results of the election
Premier before election
Robert Cosgrove
Labor
Elected Premier
Robert Cosgrove
Labor

The 1941 Tasmanian state election was held on 13 December 1941 in the Australian state of Tasmania to elect 30 members of the Tasmanian House of Assembly. The election used the Hare-Clark proportional representation system — six members were elected from each of five electorates.

The Labor Party had won the 1937 election with a three-seat majority over the Nationalist Party. Labor leader and Premier Albert Ogilvie had died in office on 10 June 1939, and had been replaced by Edmund Dwyer-Gray and then Robert Cosgrove, who led Labor into the 1941 election. Sir Henry Baker continued to lead the Nationalists.

In spite of Cosgrove's refusal to placate the Labor Party's left wing, and criticism from Bill Morrow of the Launceston Trades Hall Council, Labor consolidated its substantial majority even further, winning a further two seats for a total of 20.

== Results ==
| Party | Votes | % | +/– | Seats | +/– |
|---|---|---|---|---|---|
| Labor | 75,544 | 62.59 | +3.92 | 20 | ▲2 |
| Nationalist | 44,158 | 36.59 | -2.28 | 10 | ▼2 |
| Independents | 996 | 0.83 | -1.64 | 0 | Steady |
| Total | 120,698 | 100.00 | – | 30 | – |
| Valid votes | 120,698 | 95.01 | | | |
| Invalid/blank votes | 6,344 | 4.99 | -2.59 | | |
| Total votes | 127,042 | 100.00 | – | | |
| Registered voters/turnout | 139,234 | 91.24 | -3.05 | | |

Popular vote
| Labor | 62.59% |
| Nationalist | 36.58% |
| Independents | 0.83% |

Seats
| Labor | 66.67% |
| Nationalist | 33.33% |

== Distribution of votes ==
=== Primary vote by division ===
| | Bass | Darwin | Denison | Franklin | Wilmot |
|---|---|---|---|---|---|
| Labor Party | 64.2% | 58.5% | 67.7% | 65.2% | 56.9% |
| Nationalist | 35.7% | 41.5% | 31.0% | 32.2% | 43.1% |
| Other | – | – | 1.3% | 2.7% | – |

=== Distribution of seats ===
| Electorate | Seats won |
|---|---|
| Bass | |
| Darwin | |
| Denison | |
| Franklin | |
| Wilmot | |

| Labor |
| Nationalist |

== See also ==
- Members of the Tasmanian House of Assembly, 1941–1946
- Candidates of the 1941 Tasmanian state election
