= Robin McKendrick =

Australian politician (born 1943)

Robin Lee McKendrick (born 2 July 1943, Ulverstone, Tasmania) is a former Independent member of the Tasmanian Legislative Council. He was first elected to the now abolished Division of Cornwall on 26 May 1984. He held the seat for one term but was defeated in 1990 by Ray Bailey.

Tasmanian Legislative Council
Preceded by Mac Le Fevre	Member for Cornwall; 1984–1990	Succeeded by Ray Bailey
