= Tasman Shields =

Australian politician (1872–1950)

Tasman Shields (20 November 1872 – 28 August 1950) was an Australian politician.

He was born in Launceston. In 1915 he was elected to the Tasmanian Legislative Council as an independent member for Launceston. He held the seat until 1936, when he was defeated. Shields died in Launceston in 1950.

Tasmanian Legislative Council
Preceded by Charles Russen	Member for Launceston; 1915–1936; Served alongside: Peter McCrackan/Frank Hart	Succeeded by Alexander Evans
