= Electoral division of Roland =

Former electoral division of the Tasmanian Legislative Council

The Electoral division of Roland was an electoral division in the Tasmanian Legislative Council of Australia. It existed for two years from 1997 to 1999 and never faced an election. The seat was a renaming of the old seat of Tamar, which was then renamed Rowallan.

== Members ==
Member	Party	Period
John Loone	Independent	1997–1999

== See also ==
- Tasmanian Legislative Council electoral divisions
