= John Loone =

Australian politician

John Arthur Loone (25 January 1931 – 3 August 2018) was an Australian politician. He was an Independent member of the Tasmanian Legislative Council from 1989 to 2001, representing Tamar, Roland and finally Rowallan.

Loone was born in Deloraine. He was elected to the seat of Tamar in 1989, and held it until 1997, when it was renamed Roland. In 1999, Roland was abolished, and Loone was elected to the new seat of Rowallan, which he held until his retirement in 2001.

Tasmanian Legislative Council
Preceded by Jeff Coates	Member for Tamar; 1989–1997	Abolished
New seat	Member for Roland; 1997–1999	Abolished
New seat	Member for Rowallan; 1999–2001	Succeeded by Greg Hall
