= George McElwee =

Australian engineer and politician (1879 – ?)

George Johnston McElwee (21 May 1879 – ?) was an Australian engineer and politician. He was born in Launceston, Tasmania. In 1940 he was elected to the Tasmanian Legislative Council as the Labor candidate to represent Launceston, beating the elderly Independent Frank Hart. He held the seat until his defeat in 1946.

McElwee joined the Launceston City Council's electrical department as an apprentice in 1896. He was appointed assistant city electrical engineer in 1919 and in 1934 became the superintendent of substations. McElwee was abruptly dismissed in March 1939 and paid one month's salary in lieu of notice. He had earlier publicly criticised the council, including at a royal commission into municipal administration, although the council stated that his dismissal was unrelated. McElwee eventually rejoined the council and retired in 1952 at the age of 73, as the electrical engineer in charge of the Launceston trolleybuses. He also served on the Northern Ambulance Board, the Fire Brigade Board, and the Technical College Board.

McElwee ran unsuccessfully in the Division of Bass at the 1934 federal election, standing on a social credit platform. He was the founder of the Launceston branch of the Douglas Social Credit Association, which he stated was non-political; he retained his membership of the ALP rather than the Douglas Credit Party.

He was the brother-in-law of James Guy and uncle of Allan Guy.

Tasmanian Legislative Council
Preceded by Frank Hart	Member for Launceston; 1940–1946; Served alongside: Evans/Robinson	Succeeded by Richard Green
