= Mike Gaffney =

Australian politician

The Honourable Mike Gaffney MLC

Member of the Legislative Council for Mersey
- Incumbent
- Assumed office 2 May 2009
- Preceded by: Norma Jamieson

Personal details
- Born: Michael Victor Gaffney; 30 November 1959 (age 66) Devonport, Tasmania, Australia
- Education: University of Tasmania
- Occupation: Teacher

Michael Victor Gaffney (born 30 November 1959) is an Australian politician. He has been an independent member of the Tasmanian Legislative Council since 2009, representing the seat of Mersey.

Born in Devonport, Gaffney was trained as a teacher, and entered politics as a Latrobe councillor in 1994. In 2002, he became the Mayor, and was President of the Tasmanian Local Government Association from 2006. In 2002, he contested Braddon in the House of Assembly for Labor, but was unsuccessful. In 2009 he announced his candidacy for Mersey, which was being vacated by sitting independent Norma Jamieson.

Tasmanian Legislative Council
Preceded by Norma Jamieson	Member for Mersey; 2009–present	Incumbent
