= James McDonald (Tasmanian politician) =

Australian politician

James McDonald (12 January 1877 – 17 October 1947) was Labor Party Member of the Tasmania House of Assembly for the electorate of Bass from 26 June 1915, when he was successful at a by-election, until his defeat at the election held on 25 March 1916. McDonald was elected to the Tasmanian Legislative Council for the electorate of Gordon on 2 May 1916, and held his seat until he was defeated on 2 May 1922, but he won office again for the Gordon on 8 May 1928, and held the seat until his death in 1947. He held Ministerial office as Attorney General from 1940 to 1946 and as Minister for Mines from 1946 to 1947.

McDonald served as president of the Tasmanian Branch of the Australian Workers Union, and was Secretary of the Tasmanian Branch of the Australian Labor Party from 1931 to 1935.

He was the father of John Joseph McDonald and Thomas Raymond McDonald, who both served as members of the Tasmanian House of Assembly.

Tasmanian House of Assembly
Preceded by Arthur Anderson	Member for Bass; 1915–1916	Succeeded by Allan Guy
Tasmanian Legislative Council
Preceded by Arthur Morrisby	Member for Gordon; 1916–1922	Succeeded by Andrew Lawson
Preceded by Andrew Lawson	Member for Gordon; 1928–1947	Succeeded by Thomas d'Alton
