= Rosemary Armitage =

Australian politician (born 1955)

The Honourable Rosemary Armitage MLC JP

Member of the Legislative Council for Launceston
- Incumbent
- Assumed office 7 May 2011
- Preceded by: Don Wing

Deputy Mayor of Launceston
- In office 2007–2009
- Preceded by: Annette Waddle
- Succeeded by: Jeremy Ball

Alderman of Launceston City
- In office 2005–2014

Personal details
- Born: 5 December 1955 (age 70) Launceston, Tasmania, Australia
- Spouse: Steven Armitage (m. 1978–2011)
- Domestic partner: Bruce Potter
- Children: 4

Rosemary Lois Armitage (born 5 December 1955) is an Australian politician, an independent member of the Tasmanian Legislative Council, representing the electoral division of Launceston since her election on 7 May 2011.

Prior to her election to the Legislative Council, Armitage was an alderman in the Launceston City Council. She was elected to the council in 2005, and served as deputy mayor.

Tasmanian Legislative Council
Preceded by Don Wing	Member for Launceston; 2011–present	Incumbent
