= Dennis Lonergan =

Australian politician

Dennis Gannon Lonergan (30 March 1906 – 15 September 1965) was an Australian politician.

He was born in Deloraine, Tasmania. In 1945 he was elected to the Tasmanian Legislative Council as an independent member for the seat of Hobart. In 1946 the seat, which had had three members, was divided and Lonergan was assigned the seat of Newdegate, which he held until his defeat in 1951. He died in New Norfolk in 1965.

Tasmanian Legislative Council
Preceded by Arthur Tyler	Member for Hobart; 1945–1946; Served alongside: Charles Eady, William Strutt	Succeeded by John Soundy
New seat	Member for Newdegate; 1946–1951	Succeeded by George Gray
