= Peter Schulze =

Australian politician (1935–2019)

Peter Ross Schulze (6 November 1935 – 21 May 2019) was an Australian politician.

He was born in Queenstown, Tasmania, and qualified with a Diploma of Electrical Engineering. In 1988 he was elected to the Tasmanian Legislative Council as the independent member for Gordon, serving until the seat's abolition in 1999, at which time he retired.

Tasmanian Legislative Council
Preceded by Alby Broadby	Member for Gordon; 1988–1999	Abolished
