= George Gray (Tasmanian politician) =

Australian politician

George Herbert Gray (9 May 1899 – 5 August 1984) was an Australian politician.

He was born in Hobart to Sarah Louisa Elizabeth Gray (née Gadd) and John Gray and was raised in Fern Tree, attending Neika State School. In the late 1920s Gray founded Gray Bros cartage and trucking company with offices and depots in Hobart, New Norfolk, Huonville and Queenstown. He was an Alderman and Deputy Lord Mayor at Hobart City Council from 1949 to 1958. In 1946 he was elected to the Tasmanian House of Assembly as an independent member for Franklin. He was defeated in 1950, but in 1951 was elected to the Tasmanian Legislative Council as the member for Newdegate. He served until his defeat in 1957. Gray died in Hobart in 1984. He was married to Alma Bertha Sproule and had five children; Jack, Bruce, Valma, Donald and Douglas.

Tasmanian Legislative Council
| Preceded by Dennis Lonergan | Member for Newdegate; 1951–1957 | Succeeded by Brian Miller |
