= Mac Le Fevre =

Australian politician (1923–2004)

Vernon Mackenzie "Mac" Le Fevre (15 February 1923 – 24 December 2004) was an Australian politician.

He was born in Pyengana, Tasmania. In 1959 he was elected to the Tasmanian House of Assembly as a Labor member for Bass. He was defeated in 1969, but returned to the House in 1972. He served a period as Deputy Chair of Committees. In 1976 he retired from the House, and in 1978 ran successfully as an independent for the Tasmanian Legislative Council seat of Cornwall, serving until his retirement in 1984. He died in Launceston in 2004.

Tasmanian Legislative Council
Preceded by Frank King	Member for Cornwall; 1978–1984	Succeeded by Robin McKendrick
