= Arthur Morrisby =

Australian politician

Arthur Morrisby (19 December 1847 – 16 September 1925) was an Australian politician. He was born in Clarence, Tasmania. In 1899 he was elected to the Tasmanian Legislative Council as the Independent member for Gordon, serving until 1916. He was Chair of Committees from 1907 to 1916 and, after ceasing to be a member, Acting Clerk of the council from 1917 to 1919. Morrisby died at Adams River in 1925.

Tasmanian Legislative Council
New seat	Member for Gordon; 1899–1916	Succeeded by James McDonald
