= Electoral division of Emu Bay =

Former electoral division of the Tasmanian Legislative Council

The Electoral division of Emu Bay was an electoral division in the Tasmanian Legislative Council of Australia. It existed for two years from 1997 to 1999 and never faced an election. The seat was a renaming of the old seat of West Devon, which was then abolished when the Council was reduced from 19 to 15 seats. It took its name from the original name of the town of Burnie.

== Members ==
Member	Party	Period
Des Hiscutt	Independent	1997–1999

== See also ==
- Burnie, Tasmania
- Tasmanian Legislative Council electoral divisions
