= Hugh Hiscutt =

Australian politician (1926–2023)

Hugh James Hiscutt AM (10 July 1926 – 21 March 2023) was an Australian politician who was an independent Member of the Parliament of Tasmania from 1983 to 1995.

== Life and career ==
Hiscutt was born in Burnie, Tasmania on 10 July 1926. In 1983, he was elected to the Tasmanian Legislative Council as the independent member for West Devon. He held the seat until he retired in 1995, at which point he was succeeded by his brother Des. His niece by marriage, Leonie Hiscutt, was a member of the Tasmanian Legislative Council representing Montgomery until 2025, when she was succeeded by her son, Casey Hiscutt.

In the 2020 Queen's Birthday Honours, Hiscutt was awarded Membership of the Order of Australia in the General Division (AM) for 'significant service to the people and Parliament of Tasmania, and to the community of West Devon'.

Hiscutt died in Howth, Tasmania on 21 March 2023, at the age of 96.

Tasmanian Legislative Council
Preceded by William Young	Member for West Devon; 1983–1995	Succeeded by Des Hiscutt
