= Arthur Tattersall =

Australian politician

Arthur William Tattersall (21 April 1876 – 26 June 1962) was an Australian politician.

He was born in Launceston. In 1947 he was elected to the Tasmanian Legislative Council as the independent member for West Devon, serving until his retirement in 1953. Tattersall died in Wynyard in 1962.

Tasmanian Legislative Council
New seat	Member for West Devon; 1947–1953	Succeeded by Walter Davis
