= Richard Green (politician) =

Australian politician and judge (1907–1961)

The Hon. Sir (Richard) Kenneth Green KBE (3 December 1907 – 19 March 1961) was an Australian politician and judge.

He was born in Burnie, Tasmania. In 1946 he was elected to the Tasmanian Legislative Council as the independent member for Launceston, but he resigned in 1950 to take up a seat on the Tasmanian Supreme Court. Green was knighted in 1957 and died in Melbourne in 1961.

Tasmanian Legislative Council
Preceded by George McElwee; William Robinson	Member for Launceston; 1946–1950	Succeeded by Arthur Grounds
