= Electoral division of Leven =

Former Tasmanian Legislative Council electoral division

The Electoral division of Leven was an electoral division in the Tasmanian Legislative Council of Australia. It existed for two years from 1997 to 1999 and faced a single by-election in 1997. The seat was a renaming of the old seat of Meander, which was then renamed Montgomery.

== Members ==
Member	Party	Period
Sue Smith	Independent	1997–1999

== See also ==
- Tasmanian Legislative Council electoral divisions
