= Craig Farrell (politician) =

Australian politician (born 1964)

The Honourable Craig Farrell MLC

President of the Tasmanian Legislative Council
- Incumbent
- Assumed office 21 May 2019
- Preceded by: Jim Wilkinson

Member of the Tasmanian Legislative Council for Derwent
- Incumbent
- Assumed office 7 May 2011
- Preceded by: Michael Aird

Personal details
- Born: Craig Maxwell Farrell; 28 January 1964 (age 62) Scottsdale, Tasmania, Australia
- Party: Labor Party
- Children: Casey Farrell
- Occupation: Television presenter, television sales executive, real estate representative
- Website: craigfarrell.com.au

Craig Maxwell Farrell (born 28 January 1964) is an Australian politician, and a member of the Tasmanian Legislative Council representing the seat of Derwent for the Labor Party.

In the 1980s, Farrell hosted The Cartoon Company, a Saturday morning cartoon programming block on TasTV, with a costumed character called "Boss Poss". From the 1990s, he was a television sales executive and real estate representative.

Farrell was elected to the Legislative Council in a by-election on 7 May 2011 following the resignation of Michael Aird in 2010. He also served as a councillor and Deputy Mayor of Derwent Valley Council until October 2011, and was an electoral officer in the New Norfolk office of federal MP Dick Adams. In February 2012 he stood down as president of the Derwent Valley Railway Preservation Society but remained on the board.

On his first day in Parliament, Farrell was appointed Deputy Leader of Government Business in the Upper House. A year later, he was appointed Leader of Government Business in the Upper House on the retirement of the incumbent, Doug Parkinson.

On 21 May 2019, Farrell was elected as president of the Legislative Council, following the retirement of the incumbent, Jim Wilkinson.

In 2021, Farrell was elected for a further six-year term as the Member for Derwent.

In 2024, his son Casey Farrell was elected to the Tasmanian House of Assembly. He was not re-elected at the 2025 Tasmanian state election.

Tasmanian Legislative Council
Preceded by Michael Aird	Member for Derwent; 2011–present	Incumbent
Preceded by Jim Wilkinson	President of the Tasmanian Legislative Council; 2019−present	Incumbent
Political offices
Preceded by Nick McKim	Minister for Corrections and Consumer Protection; 2014	Succeeded by Vanessa Goodwin
Preceded by Nick McKim	Minister for Sustainable Transport; 2014	Ministry abolished
