= Ross Ginn =

Australian politician

Ross Winnington Ginn (born 6 November 1942) is a former Australian politician.

He was born in Hobart, Tasmania. In 1986 he was elected to the Tasmanian Legislative Council as the independent member for Newdegate. He served as Chair of Committees from 1996 to 1998, when he resigned from politics due to ill health.

Tasmanian Legislative Council
Preceded by Brian Miller	Member for Newdegate; 1986–1998	Succeeded by John White
