= Stephen John Wilson =

Australian politician

Stephen John Wilson (born 27 April 1948) is a former Australian politician from Tasmania, serving as an independent member of the Tasmanian Legislative Council from 1981-1999 (18 years).

Wilson entered politics on 23 May 1981 when he was elected to the southern based seat of Monmouth in the Tasmanian Legislative Council. He was re-elected a further two times to the seat, in 1987 and 1993. During the 1998 Legislative Council electoral boundaries redistribution, the seat of Monmouth was abolished and Stephen Wilson was allocated as the inaugural member for the Electoral division of Rumney.

He contested the 1999 election as the sitting member for Rumney, but was defeated by Labor candidate Lin Thorp on the final recount of votes by a tally of less than 100.

Tasmanian Legislative Council
Preceded by Louis Bisdee	Member for Monmouth; 1981–1999	Abolished
