= Norma Jamieson =

Australian politician

Norma Mary Jamieson (born 23 May 1941, in Ulverstone) is an Australian politician. She was an independent member of the Tasmanian Legislative Council (upper house) in the electoral division of Mersey from 2003 until 2009. She worked as a nurse. Norma Jamieson is a widow with two children. Her interests include: bushwalking, gardening, farming, tree farming, light aircraft flying, sports and travel. In recent bills she voted against the state government's same sex relationships bill, but in favour of the sex industry regulation bill. She has been dubbed a 'traditional conservative'.

Tasmanian Legislative Council
| Preceded by Geoff Squibb | Member for Mersey; 2003–2009 | Succeeded by Mike Gaffney |
