= Ellis Dean =

Australian politician

Ellis Dean (1 July 1854 – 8 November 1920) was an Australian politician.

He was born in Macquarie Plains, Van Diemen's Land. In 1901 he was elected to the Tasmanian Legislative Council as the member for Derwent. He represented the seat until his death in New Norfolk in 1920.

Tasmanian Legislative Council
Preceded by Walter Gellibrand	Member for Derwent; 1901–1920	Succeeded by Louis Shoobridge
