= John White (Australian politician) =

Australian politician (1942–2020)

The Honourable John White

Minister for Health
- In office 3 July 1989 – 17 February 1992
- Preceded by: Roger Groom
- Succeeded by: Roger Groom

Member of the Tasmanian House of Assembly for Denison
- In office 8 February 1986 – 29 August 1998

Member of the Tasmanian Legislative Council for Newdegate
- In office 19 September 1998 – 29 June 1999
- Preceded by: Ross Ginn
- Succeeded by: Division abolished

Personal details
- Born: John Charles White; 2 October 1942 Hobart, Tasmania, Australia
- Died: 20 June 2020 (aged 77) Hobart, Tasmania, Australia
- Party: Labor Party
- Relations: Alfred White (father)

John Charles White (2 October 1942 – 20 June 2020) was a Tasmanian Labor politician during the years 1986 to 1999. He was the son of Alfred White (MHA from 1941 to 1959).

White was first elected as a member for Denison in 1986. He held the position of Health Minister during 1989–1992. During 1992–1998 he was shadow minister for arts, justice, environment and Aboriginal affairs. In August 1998 he resigned from his lower house seat to contest the upper house seat of Newdegate. He was successful and took the position in September 1998.

In June 1999, Newdegate was abolished when the size of parliament was reduced.

In early 2003, White and two others formed a company called Tasmanian Compliance Corporation (TCC). In August 2003 the company was awarded a Tasmanian government contract to handle building accreditation, complaints and training.

Following the 2006 state election, White came under significant public scrutiny after a confidential service level agreement, signed by White and the minister Bryan Green which was being negotiated from November 2005, was leaked to Sue Neales, chief reporter of The Mercury.

In relation to this matter White was charged with one count of interfering with an executive officer contrary to section 69 of the Tasmanian Criminal Code. After initially pleading not guilty, the Chief Justice ruled that the signing of the document was the offence, and did not require any 'mala fides' (bad faith). White then changed his plea to guilty, on legal advice of his barrister, in the Supreme Court on 20 November 2007. On 10 December 2007, he was sentenced to a two-year good behaviour bond and had no conviction recorded.

Political offices
Preceded by Roger Groom	Minister for Health; 1989–1992	Succeeded by Roger Groom
Tasmanian Legislative Council
Preceded by Ross Ginn	Member for Newdegate; 1998–1999	Abolished
