= Louis Shoobridge Sr. =

Australian politician

Louis Manton Shoobridge Sr. (25 October 1851 – 12 March 1939) was an Australian politician. He was born in New Norfolk, Van Diemen's Land. He unsuccessfully contested the 1914 Senate election as a Liberal candidate and the 1919 election for the federal seat of Franklin as a Nationalist candidate. In 1921 he was elected to the Tasmanian Legislative Council as the Independent member for Derwent, serving until his retirement in 1937. His father Ebenezer Shoobridge, brother William Shoobridge, son Rupert Shoobridge and grandson Louis Shoobridge Jr. were all members of the Tasmanian Parliament.

Tasmanian Legislative Council
Preceded by Ellis Dean	Member for Derwent; 1921–1937	Succeeded by Rupert Shoobridge
