= Des Hiscutt =

Australian politician

Desmond Miller Hiscutt (born 5 March 1933) is an Australian former politician.

He was born in Burnie, Tasmania. In 1995, he was elected to the Tasmanian Legislative Council as the independent member for West Devon, succeeding his brother Hugh. West Devon was renamed Emu Bay in 1997, but the seat was abolished in 1999 and Hiscutt was defeated in his run for the seat of Murchison. His niece by marriage, Leonie Hiscutt, was a member of the Tasmanian Legislative Council representing Montgomery until 2025, when she was succeeded by her son, Casey Hiscutt.

Tasmanian Legislative Council
Preceded by Hugh Hiscutt	Member for West Devon; 1995–1997	Abolished
New seat	Member for Emu Bay; 1997–1999	Abolished
