= Charles Davies (Tasmanian politician) =

Australian politician

Charles Ellis Davies (13 May 1847 – 1 February 1921) was an Australian politician.

He was born in Wellington, New South Wales, the son of John Davies, later co-founder of the Hobart Mercury, and younger brother of John George Davies. In 1897 he was elected to the Tasmanian Legislative Council as the member for Cambridge. He held the seat until his death in Pontville in 1921.

Tasmanian Legislative Council
| Preceded by Alfred Lord | Member for Cambridge; 1897–1921 | Succeeded by Joe Darling |
