= Geoff Squibb =

Australian politician

Geoffrey Bruce "Geoff" Squibb (born 27 October 1946) is a former Australian politician. He was an Independent member of the Tasmanian Legislative Council from 1990 to 2003, representing Mersey.

Squibb was born in Devonport, and was its Mayor from 1985–99. In 1990 he was elected to the Tasmanian Legislative Council for Mersey, holding the seat until his defeat by Norma Jamieson, another Independent, in 2003.

Tasmanian Legislative Council
Preceded by Harry Braid	Member for Mersey; 1990–2003	Succeeded by Norma Jamieson
