= Michael Aird =

Australian politician (born 1949)

The Honourable Michael Aird AM

Treasurer of Tasmania
- In office 5 April 2006 – 6 December 2010
- Premier: Paul Lennon; David Bartlett
- Preceded by: Paul Lennon
- Succeeded by: Lara Giddings
- Constituency: Derwent

Personal details
- Born: 12 April 1949 (age 77) Melbourne, Victoria
- Party: Labor Party

Michael Anthony Aird AM (born 12 April 1949 in Melbourne) is a former Tasmanian politician. He was an ALP member of the Tasmanian Legislative Council in the Division of Derwent from 1995 to 2011. From 2006 to 2010, he was the treasurer of Tasmania, one of few legislative councillors in history to have held a ministerial portfolio and the second to serve as treasurer (after David Crean in 1998–2004), as treasurers usually sit in the lower house, the House of Assembly, the only house that can initiate money bills. He took over the role of Treasurer from Paul Lennon after the 2006 state election.

He was Government leader in the Legislative Council from 1998 to 2006.

Aird first entered parliament in 1979, as a member of the House of Assembly seat of Franklin. He was a member from 1979 until 1986, and then again from 1989 until 1995. During this time, he held many ministerial positions, including Environment, Industrial Relations, Employment, and Education.

When Labor member Charles Batt retired in 1995, Aird successfully contested election in the upper house seat of Derwent. He was re-elected in 1997, 2003, and 2009. On 9 November 2010, Aird announced that he was retiring from politics and that he would step down as Treasurer and as a Legislative Council member on 6 December. His interests include sport and the arts.

In 2016 Aird was appointed a Member of the Order of Australia for significant service to the Parliament and community of Tasmania, particularly to infrastructure development and microeconomic reform.

== See also ==
- Members of the Tasmanian Legislative Council

Tasmanian Legislative Council
Preceded by Charles Batt	Member for Derwent; 1995–2011	Succeeded by Craig Farrell
Political offices
Preceded by Paul Lennon	Treasurer of Tasmania; 2006–2010	Succeeded by Lara Giddings
