= Joe Darling =

Australian cricketer (1870–1946)

Joe Darling CBE
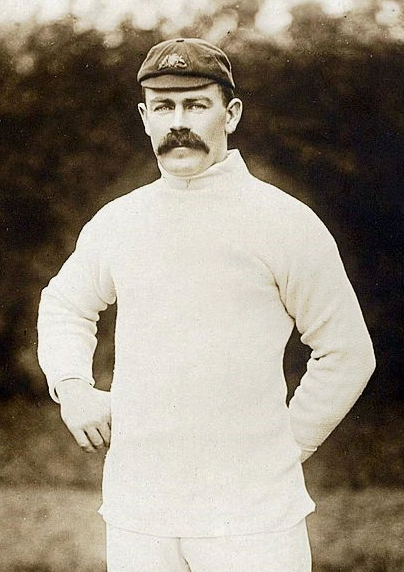
- Darling, c. 1905
- Born: Joseph Darling; 21 November 1870; Glen Osmond, South Australia
- Died: 2 January 1946 (aged 75); Hobart, Tasmania
- Education: Prince Alfred College
- Occupations: Cricket player, farmer, politician
- Parents: John Darling Sr. (father); Isabella, née Ferguson (mother)
- Relatives: John Darling Jr. (brother); Harold Gordon Darling (nephew)
- Cricket career

Personal information
- Nickname: Paddy
- Height: 1.72 m (5 ft 8 in)
- Batting: Left-handed
- Role: Batsman

International information
- National side: Australia (1894–1905)
- Test debut (cap 64): 14 December 1894 v England
- Last Test: 14 August 1905 v England

Domestic team information
- Years: Team
- 1893/94–1907/08: South Australia

Career statistics
Competition	Test	First-class
Matches	34	202
Runs scored	1657	10,635
Batting average	28.56	34.52
100s/50s	3/8	19/55
Top score	178	210
Balls bowled	–	68
Wickets	–	1
Bowling average	–	55.00
5 wickets in innings	–	0
10 wickets in match	–	0
Best bowling	–	1/5
Catches/stumpings	27/–	148/–
- Source: CricketArchive, 10 February 2008

Tasmanian Legislative Council
- In office 1921–1946
- Preceded by: Charles Davies
- Succeeded by: Geoffrey Green
- Constituency: Cambridge

Joseph Darling CBE (21 November 1870 – 2 January 1946) was an Australian cricketer who played 34 Test matches as a specialist batsman between 1894 and 1905. As captain, he led Australia in a total of 21 Tests, winning seven and losing four. In Test cricket, he scored 1,657 runs at an average of 28.56 per innings, including three centuries. Darling toured England four times with the Australian team—in 1896, 1899, 1902 and 1905; the last three tours as captain. He was captain of the Australian cricket team in England in 1902, widely recognised as one of the best teams in Australian cricket history.

He was a stocky, compact man and a strong driver of the ball, playing most of his cricket as an opening batsman. He was a patient batsman and was known for his solid defence, but he was able to score quickly when required. In Sydney in 1897–98, he scored 160 in 165 minutes, including 30 boundaries to assist his team in defeating the English. He was the first man to score 500 runs in a Test series and also the first to score three centuries in a series. His captaincy was disciplinarian in nature but his teammates respected his broad cricket knowledge. Even tempered with a strong personality, he was a stickler for fair play on the field. His teammates gave him the nickname "Paddy" due to a supposed resemblance to the Australian boxer, Frank "Paddy" Slavin.

His cricket career was interrupted several times due to his obligations as a farmer, first growing wheat in South Australia, and later as a wool-grower in Tasmania. He was a member of several bodies dedicated to agriculture in Tasmania, including the responsible authority for the Royal Hobart Show. He was a pioneer in activities such as rabbit eradication and pasture improvement. He entered politics in 1921, standing as an independent in the Tasmanian Legislative Council, where he was a forceful speaker. He retained his seat in the Tasmanian Parliament until his death following a gall bladder operation in 1946.

== Early life and career ==
Darling was born on 21 November 1870 in Glen Osmond, South Australia, the sixth son of John Darling, a grain merchant and his wife Isabella, née Ferguson. He was educated at Prince Alfred College, where he took an interest in cricket. At the age of 15, he scored a record 252 runs in the "inter-collegiate" match, the annual fixture against fierce rival St Peter's College. His future Test teammate, Clem Hill, would later beat this record, scoring 360. Not long after, he was included in a combined South Australian/Victoria XV that played the Australian XI in 1886. He made only 16 runs, but the manner in which he made them saw senior players hail him as a future champion.

His father, disapproving of Darling's fondness for sport, sent him away from his cricket and Australian rules football teams to spend twelve months at Roseworthy Agricultural School. Later, Darling worked in a bank for a time before his father appointed him manager of a wheat farm. Working on the farm added size and strength to an already stocky and athletic frame. He was selected for the South Australian team at age 19, but his father would not allow him time off the farm to play.

After two years in the bush, Darling returned to Adelaide and cricket. He opened a sports store on Rundle Street, Adelaide and was soon selected to represent South Australia in inter-colonial cricket. He made his first-class cricket debut against New South Wales at the Adelaide Oval; scoring five and 32 as South Australia won the match by 237 runs. The next season, against the touring England team captained by Andrew Stoddart, Darling made 115, his maiden first-class century.

== Test career ==
=== Consolidation ===
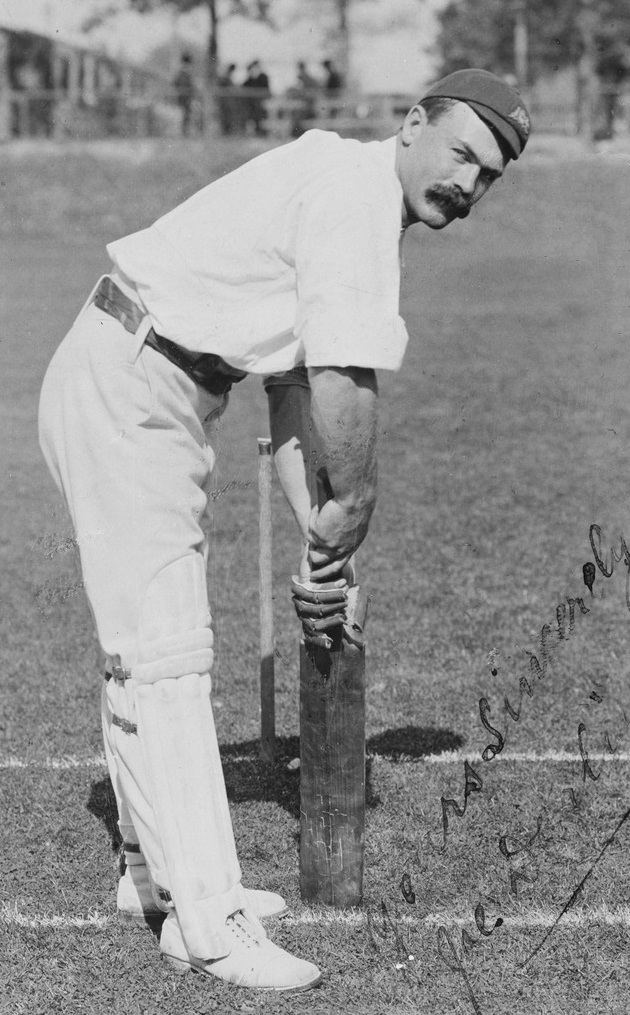
Darling in 1896

The First Test of 1894–95 against England, at the Sydney Cricket Ground, saw Darling make his Test debut. In an innings where Australia make 586 runs, including centuries for George Giffen and Syd Gregory, Darling was dismissed for a golden duck, bowled first ball by Tom Richardson. He made 53 runs in the second innings of his maiden Test. He played in all five Tests in the series, scoring 258 runs at an average of 28.66 per innings. He was included in the Australian team to tour England in 1896, where he topped the scoring aggregates for the tour with 1555 runs at an average of 29.90, including three centuries. Wisden Cricketers' Almanack stated that Darling "proved himself perhaps the best of present-day left-handed batsmen" during the tour. England won the series two Tests to one.

Andrew Stoddart brought another team to Australia to contest The Ashes in 1897–98. Australia won the series comfortably, four Tests to one. Darling started the season poorly, scoring a duck and one against the tourists for South Australia in a match in which teammate Clem Hill scored a double century. Darling went on, however, to dominate the series with the bat. His maiden Test century, 101 in the First Test at the Sydney Cricket Ground after Australia was made to follow-on, was the first made by a left-hander in Tests. It was not enough to prevent England winning by nine wickets.

In the Third Test in his home town of Adelaide, Darling scored 178 runs and Australia won the match by an innings and 13 runs. He reached his century by hitting Johnny Briggs over the eastern gate and into the nearby park. This is the only time in Ashes Tests where a player has reached 100 with a hit out of the ground. During this innings, he also became the first player to hit a six in a Test in Australia (prior to 1910, a six was awarded only if the ball was hit out of the ground). He later also hit the first six in a Test in England. Returning to Sydney for the Fifth and final Test, Darling scored 160 runs from 253 scored in total. He batted for 165 minutes, hitting 30 boundaries as Australia successfully chased 273 in the fourth innings. His first 100 came in 91 minutes; at the time, the fastest Test century scored. By the end of the season, Darling became the first player to score 500 runs in a series and the first player to score three centuries in a series.

=== Captaincy ===
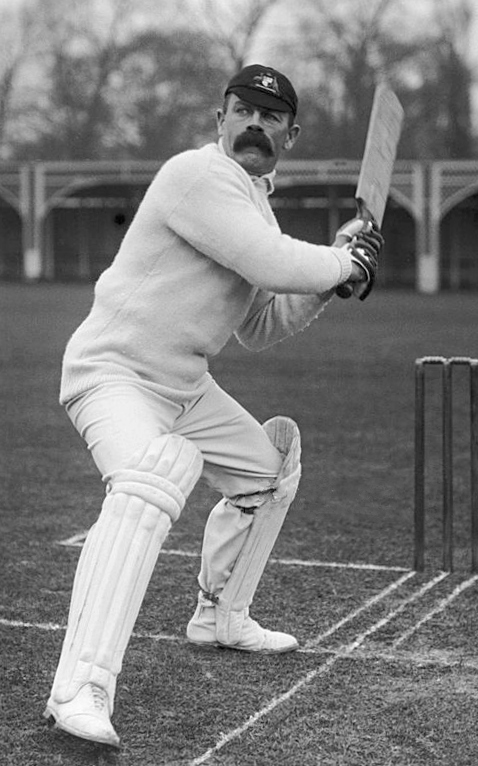
Darling c. 1905

Darling was chosen by his teammates as captain for the 1899 Australian team touring England. The team was one of the strongest seen in England to that time, with the cricket reference book Wisden stating, "By common consent the [1899 Australians] formed the strongest combination that had come from the Colonies since the great side captained by Mr. W. L. Murdoch in 1882." and that "Darling proved himself one of the very best captains that ever took a team into the field." The Australians lost only three of the 35 matches they played on the tour, winning 16 and another 16 finishing in draws. The only Test to reach a decisive result was the Second Test at Lord's, where Australia won by ten wickets due in part to centuries by Hill and Victor Trumper and a ten wicket haul by fast bowler Ernie Jones. Aside from Hill, Darling was seen by Wisden as the best batsman among the Australians. Wisden claimed, "Up to a certain point the responsibilities of captaincy seemed to tell against Darling, but during the last weeks of the tour he played marvellous cricket." Over the tour, he scored 1941 runs at an average of 41.29, topping both the averages and the aggregate for his team, and was named as one of the Wisden Cricketers of the Year.

Darling's deeds as a cricketer had reconciled his father to his sporting endeavours, but not to his sports store operation. In 1900, his father purchased "Stonehenge", a sheep station covering 10,000 acres (4,000 ha) in central Tasmania and ordered Darling to run the property on pain of exclusion from his will. Darling complied with his father's wishes and moved his family to the remote station, 34 kilometres (21 mi) along a dirt track from the nearest town, tiny Oatlands. Darling stood out of first-class cricket for nearly two years.

It was not until December 1901 that Darling was convinced to return by the Melbourne Cricket Club to captain the Australians against the touring English for the first three Tests only. The English, captained by Archie MacLaren, won the First Test in Sydney convincingly by an innings and 124 runs. The Second Test in Melbourne was played on a rain-affected pitch. MacLaren won the toss and sent Australia in to bat on the "sticky wicket". Within three hours, both teams had been dismissed; Australia holding a lead on the first innings of 51 runs. Realising the danger the pitch held to his leading batsmen, Darling re-ordered the batting line-up and opened the batting himself alongside Hugh Trumble. The pair held out the English for 90 minutes; Darling considered his 32 runs one of his best innings. Nevertheless, Barnes managed to grab five wickets in the final half-hour to leave the Australians 5/48 when stumps was called. Twenty five wickets fell in the day's play. Importantly, Australia had a 99-run lead and batsmen of the calibre of Hill, Trumper, Reggie Duff and Warwick Armstrong still to bat. The next day, on a perfect pitch, the Australian batsmen established a match-winning lead, eventually winning the Test by 229 runs. In the Third Test in Adelaide, Australia became the first team to score over 300 runs to win the fourth innings of a Test match. Darling, along with Hill and Trumble, led the record making run chase; Darling scored 62 runs. Hugh Trumble captained the final two Tests as Darling returned to his farm. Australia won both Tests and the series to retain The Ashes.

=== Return to cricket ===
Darling agreed to once again lead the Australian cricket team in England in 1902. In what was a very cold and wet summer, the Australian team won a close fought series against the strong English team two Tests to one. Given the strength of the opposition, this Australian team is often referred to as one of the best Australian teams ever assembled. The team included players of the calibre of Trumper, Hill, Armstrong, Trumble and Monty Noble; all of whom would be later included in the Australian Cricket Hall of Fame. The team lost only two matches during the tour, with Wisden saying, "No travelling team ever strove harder for victory or more completely subordinated all personal considerations to the prime object of winning matches. They formed a splendid all-round combination".

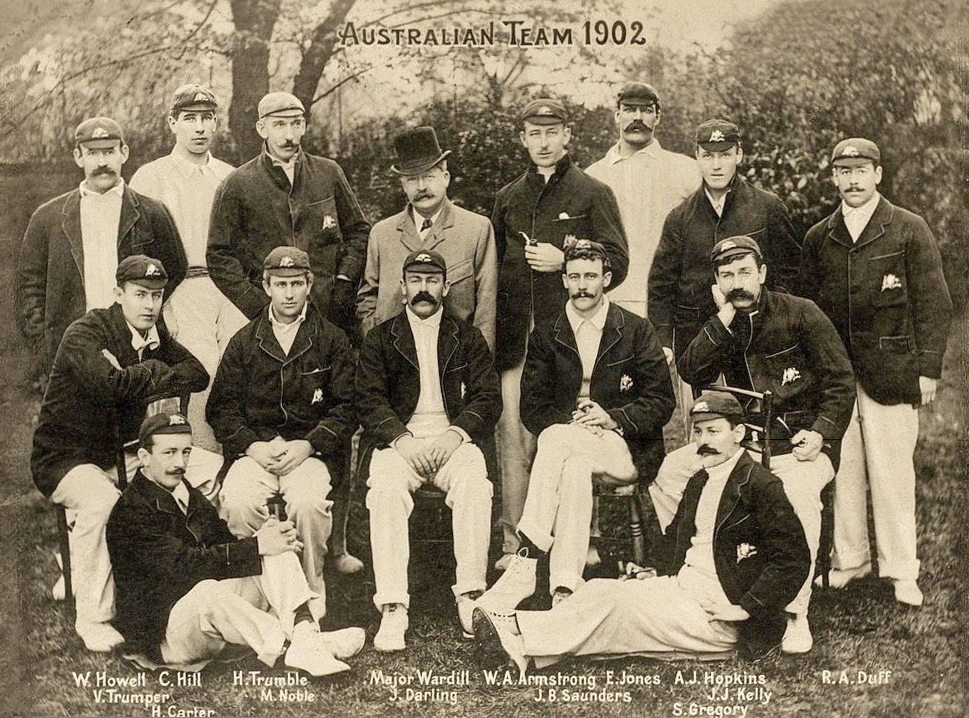
Darling (centre, middle row) with his famed 1902 touring team

The First Test at Edgbaston finished in a draw. Rain saved the Australians after they were dismissed for only 36 in their first innings; Wilfred Rhodes took seven wickets for only 17 runs. Rain again ruined the Second Test at Lord's when the final two days were washed out. The Third Test, the only Test match played at Bramall Lane, saw Australia win by 143 runs due in part to a century by Hill and Noble taking 5/51. Darling was dismissed twice by Barnes without scoring, the first Test captain to make a "pair". Australia won the Fourth Test at Old Trafford by three runs; Trumble took ten wickets for the match. The last batsman, Fred Tate, came in with England needing eight runs to secure victory. Darling brought the field in and Trumble prevented Rhodes scoring from the last three balls of his over. This left Tate to face Jack Saunders, who dismissed him with the fourth ball of his over to win the match for Australia. England won the Fifth and final Test at the Oval by one wicket. Chasing 263, England were 5/48 when Gilbert Jessop scored a century in 75 minutes to help England to victory.

The star for the Australians was Trumper who scored 2,570 runs, easily beating Darling's own record for a colonial batsman in an English season set in 1899. So important was Trumper to the Australian team that Darling, who had previously checked that all the Australians were on board the carriage to the ground, was later simply to ask "Is Vic aboard?" before giving the driver the go-ahead. Darling himself had a mixed tour with the bat.

Darling started the tour in a way that promised great things, but he did not keep up his form and fell a good deal below his standard of 1896 and 1899. His tremendous hitting power, however, was several times of the utmost value, and very likely in a season of hard wickets he would have had as good a record as ever.

— Wisden Cricketers' Almanack

On the return trip to Australia, the touring team stopped to play three Tests against South Africa, the first between the two nations. Australia won the series two Tests to nil, but Darling's own form was poor. In successive innings, Darling made 0, 14, 6, 4 and 1. After the tour, he returned to Stonehenge and took a two-year break from first-class cricket. In his absence, Monty Noble captained the Australian team against the touring English in 1903–04.

=== Final tour and retirement ===
Before the Australian team to tour England in 1905 was selected, Darling returned to first-class cricket for South Australia. He won selection in the touring squad and was named as captain. A weaker Australian bowling attack saw Darling resort to defensive measures throughout the tour. These measures included directing Armstrong to bowl his leg breaks down the leg side, where Darling had placed up to seven fielders. These measures, unpopular with the English public, saw 19 matches on the tour finish in draws, three more than the 16 matches won by Australia. Wisden said, "Leaving aside Duff's long score at the Oval, Darling was the finest batsman on the side in the Test games, playing superb cricket under very trying conditions." At Old Trafford in the Fourth Test, he made 73 out of 105 in less than ninety minutes. His innings included thirteen boundaries, all but one of them being drives. Despite his efforts, England still won the Test by an innings and 80 runs.

After losing six tosses against his English opposite number Stanley Jackson during the summer, Darling decided on a different approach before the Scarborough Festival match late in the tour. At the toss, he approached Jackson stripped to the waist and suggested, in fun, a wrestle for choice of innings.

The 1905 tour was Darling's last Test cricket foray, as he claimed that continuing to tour was unfair to his wife. He retired from first-class cricket during the 1907–08 season. In his first-class career, Darling made 10635 runs, including 19 centuries at an average of 34.52. In club cricket in Adelaide, Joe scored heavily. He averaged 144 for East Torrens Cricket Club in 1899–1900, 98.66 for Adelaide Cricket Club in 1896–97 and 86.20 for Sturt Cricket Club in 1904–05. He continued to make runs in Tasmanian club cricket right through middle age. In 1921, he made 100 runs in an hour, including 29 in one eight-ball over playing for Claremont Cricket Club. At age 52, he made 133 not out during a successful run chase where his team, Break-o'-Day, made 6/219 in 90 minutes.

He was contemptuous of the newly formed Australian Board of Control for International Cricket Matches (now known as Cricket Australia), who he saw as attempting to remove control of international cricket tours from the players. He would often refer to cricket administrators as "Dead Heads". He later represented the Tasmanian Cricket Association as a delegate to the Board of Control.

== Outside cricket ==
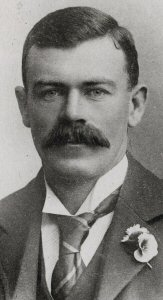
Parliamentary portrait of Darling

Following his retirement from big cricket, Darling returned to his Tasmanian sheep station, where he was involved in a range of agricultural activities. He pioneered measures to eradicate rabbits, an introduced pest then in plague proportions throughout Australia. He was an active member of organisations such as the Tasmanian Stock Holders and Orchardists' Association and the Royal Agricultural Society of Tasmania, the organising body of the Royal Hobart Show. Darling imported South Australian merino rams to improve his flock, and his wool topped the Hobart sales on several occasions. He also introduced subterranean clover to Tasmania.

In 1919, Darling moved from Stonehenge to Claremont House, around which the Hobart suburb of Claremont later formed. He was elected to the Cambridge electorate in the Tasmanian Legislative Council in 1921 as an independent. He retained his position in the Parliament until his death in 1946. In Parliament, one of his colleagues was Charles Eady, his teammate from the 1896 tour of England. Darling was recognised by his colleagues as a forceful, no-nonsense speaker. In the 1930s, he won an exemption from land tax for small farmers, and toward the end of his parliamentary career, a Royal Commission was appointed to investigate charges Darling had made regarding maladministration. The findings of the commission, released after his death, saw a government Minister and two others found guilty of accepting bribes. Darling was made a Commander of the Order of the British Empire (CBE) in the 1938 New Year Honours in recognition of his work as a member of the Legislative Assembly.

Darling married Alice Minna Blanche Francis, a wheat farmer's daughter from Mundoora, South Australia in 1893. Together they raised 15 children: ten sons and five daughters. After surgery for a ruptured gall bladder, Darling died in Hobart on 2 January 1946. He was buried at Cornelian Bay Cemetery after a Congregationalist ceremony and was survived by his wife and twelve of his children.

== Style and personality ==
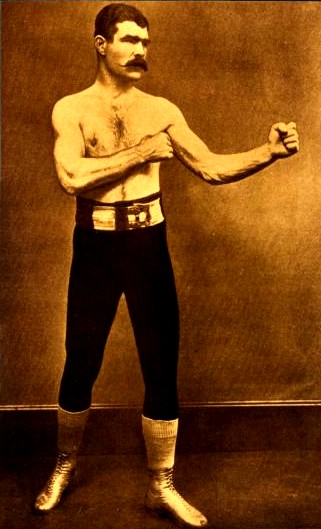
Paddy Slavin

Darling had a stocky, compact build, standing 5 feet 8 inches (1.73 metres) and weighing 12 stone 12 pounds (82 kg). His teammates thought his dark hair, blue eyes and moustache were similar to the boxer, Frank "Paddy" Slavin, and he answered to the nickname "Paddy" during his time in cricket. His time working on his father's farm had developed his strength. During his first game for South Australia, he was challenged to a naked wrestle by the fast bowler and ex-miner Ernie Jones, an informal initiation into the team. To his teammates' surprise, Darling managed to defeat the much larger Jones.

The left-handed Darling was a strong driver of the ball who showed the batsman the full face of the bat. When necessary, he was a dour defender of his wicket. His fellow players thought that was sometimes unnecessarily defensive in his approach to batting and that he was at his best when driving hard. His South Australian and Australian teammate George Giffen thought that no Australian's cut shots travelled faster past point.

Darling is a remarkable combination of stolidity and power. His driving, whenever he choose to let himself loose, is tremendous, and no left-handed batsman, at any rate in our time, has possessed quite such a defence. He always gives one the idea of being a great natural hitter, who has rigorously schooled himself to play the steady game.

— Wisden Cricketers' Almanack

Darling holds the record for the most innings in a complete Test Match career (60), without being dismissed lbw.

Darling had a strong personality and an independent outlook. Those who knew him well thought him destined to be a leader in whatever he undertook. He shunned strong drink and tobacco and found it difficult to tolerate overindulgence in alcohol. Normally even-tempered, he did show displeasure at the heckling from the crowd at Lord's at his obstinate defensive effort in the face of an Australian batting collapse. He was a stickler for fair play, but his actions against the English batsman KS Ranjitsinhji would today be seen as gamesmanship. During the bowler's approach and after the bowler had looked at the field, the Australian fielders moved behind Ranjitsinhji's back. This worried the Indian prince when playing his leg glance and eventually saw him left out of the English team.

The journalist Ray Robinson wrote that "of all Australian captains he came closest to being a disciplinarian". Regardless, his teammates continued to select him as captain, trusting in his knowledge and understanding of the game. On a wet day during the 1899 tour, a delay in play saw some of the Australians accept an invitation to the Player's tobacco factory in Nottingham. While away, the weather cleared and play began with Darling leading a team of five Australians and five substitutes onto the field. Darling later called a team meeting that saw the culprits fined £5 for breaching team rules. His approach to the hard-drinking Ernie Jones was similarly tough. To ensure that the fast bowler would not drink to excess, he selected Jones as twelfth man in a match against an English county team. When Jones refused to play, a team meeting saw him facing expulsion from the team. Darling spoke to him privately and made it clear that without an apology to his teammates and a promise to curb his drinking, he would be on the next boat bound for Australia. The firm and prompt action had a lasting effect on team discipline during his time as Australian captain. Wisden noted that "as a captain he inspired his men to reveal their best form." As a captain he was a reformer, suggesting rule changes that included making six runs the reward for clearing the boundary rather than the entire ground, and using of sawdust to fill holes in bowler's run-ups.

== Test match performance ==
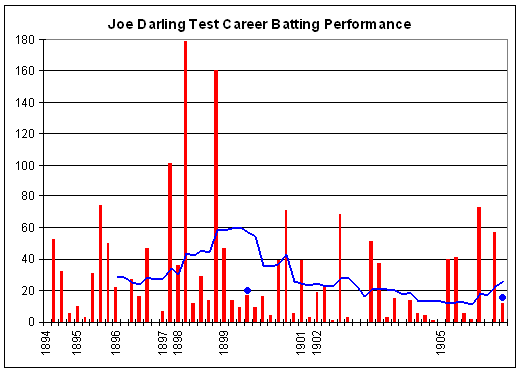
An innings-by-innings breakdown of Darling's Test match batting career, showing runs scored (red bars) and the average of the last ten innings (blue line). The blue dots indicate an innings where he was not dismissed.

== See also ==
- List of South Australian representative cricketers

== Notes ==
Preceded by Harry Trott	Australian Test cricket captains 1899–1901/2	Succeeded by Hugh Trumble
Preceded by Hugh Trumble	Australian Test cricket captains 1902–1902/3	Succeeded by Monty Noble
Preceded by Monty Noble	Australian Test cricket captains 1905	Succeeded by Monty Noble
Tasmanian Legislative Council
Preceded by Charles Davies	Member for Cambridge; 1921–1946	Succeeded by Geoffrey Green
