= Electoral division of Cambridge =

Tasmanian Legislative Council electoral division

The Electoral division of Cambridge was an electoral division in the Tasmanian Legislative Council of Australia. It existed from 1856 to 1946, when it was merged with parts of Macquarie to form the new seat of Monmouth.

== Members ==
Member	Party	Period
Francis Burgess	Independent	1856–1859
John Gregson	Independent	1859–1864
Edward Abbott	Independent	1864–1867
James Dunn	Independent	1867–1873
John Lord	Independent	1873–1890
Alfred Lord	Independent	1890–1897
Charles Davies	Independent	1897–1921
Joe Darling	Independent	1921–1946
Geoffrey Green	Independent	1946

== See also ==
- Tasmanian Legislative Council electoral divisions
