= Don Wing =

Australian politician (1938–2026)

The Honourable Don Wing AM

President of the Tasmanian Legislative Council
- In office 2002–2008
- Preceded by: Ray Bailey
- Succeeded by: Sue Smith

Member of the Legislative Council for Launceston
- In office 22 May 1982 – 7 May 2011
- Preceded by: Ray Shipp
- Succeeded by: Rosemary Armitage

Personal details
- Born: 27 April 1938 Ulverstone, Tasmania, Australia
- Died: 1 October 2026 (aged 88) Launceston, Tasmania, Australia
- Party: Independent
- Other political affiliations: Liberal Party

Donald George Wing AM (27 April 1938 – 1 October 2026) was an Australian politician. A member of the Tasmanian Legislative Council from 1982 to 2011, representing the electoral division of Launceston (briefly named Paterson), he was President of the Legislative Council from 2002 until 2008. Wing was also Mayor of Launceston from 1983 to 1987.

== Early life ==
Wing was born in Ulverstone to Roy and Ruby Wing. He had two brothers and a sister.

== Career ==
Wing was first elected to the Legislative Council on 22 May 1982. He was a Bachelor of Laws from the University of Tasmania and before entering parliament practised as a barrister. He has served as an Alderman of the Launceston City Council and as Mayor thereof; a path that was later followed by fellow conservative independent MLC Ivan Dean. He has vocally supported Dean in the face of criticism for holding both positions at once, arguing that his own experience shows that such a career is workable.

Although Wing was a former president of the Tasmanian branch of the Liberal Party, he has always served as an independent in the Legislative Council due to his party's stance of not endorsing partisan candidates to the body and instead backing conservative independents. He announced that he would not contest his seat at the next election in May 2011, and relinquished the presidency to allow himself more scope to debate issues on the floor of the Legislative Council chamber.

== Death ==
Wing died in Launceston on 1 October 2026, at the age of 88.

Tasmanian Legislative Council
Preceded by Ray Bailey	President of the Tasmanian Legislative Council; 2002–2008	Succeeded by Sue Smith
Preceded by Ray Shipp	Member for Launceston; 1982–1999	Abolished
New seat	Member for Paterson; 1999–2008	Abolished
New seat	Member for Launceston; 2008–2011	Succeeded by Rosemary Armitage
