= Frank King (Australian politician) =

Australian politician (1912–1981)

Frank Bernard King (18 September 1912 – 12 May 1981) was an Australian politician.

He was born in Launceston, of which he was mayor from 1968 to 1969. In 1972, he was elected to the Tasmanian Legislative Council as the independent member for Cornwall. He held the seat until his retirement in 1978.

Tasmanian Legislative Council
Preceded by Geoffrey Foot	Member for Cornwall; 1972–1978	Succeeded by Mac Le Fevre
