= Ernest Record =

Australian politician (1899–1956)

Ernest George Record OBE (10 May 1899 – 25 September 1956) was an Australian politician.

He was born in Strood, Kent, England. An accountant before entering politics, he was elected to the Tasmanian Legislative Council in 1948 as the independent member for Cornwall. He served until his retirement in 1954. Record died in 1956 in Launceston.

Tasmanian Legislative Council
Preceded by Margaret McIntyre	Member for Cornwall; 1948–1954	Succeeded by John Orchard
