= Hubert Nichols =

Australian politician (1864–1940)

Hubert Allan Nichols (26 July 1864 – 21 August 1940) was an Australian politician. He was born at Macquarie Plains, Tasmania. In 1902 he was elected to the Tasmanian Legislative Council as the Independent member for Mersey, leading the Opposition group in the council from May 1906 to January 1909. In 1924 he was defeated, but he was elected to Meander in 1926, serving until 1935. Nichols died in 1940 in Ulverstone.

Tasmanian Legislative Council
Preceded by John Henry	Member for Mersey; 1902–1924	Succeeded by Alexander Lillico
Preceded by John Hope	Member for Meander; 1926–1935	Succeeded by Percy Best
