= Electoral division of Paterson =

Former electoral division of the Tasmanian Legislative Council

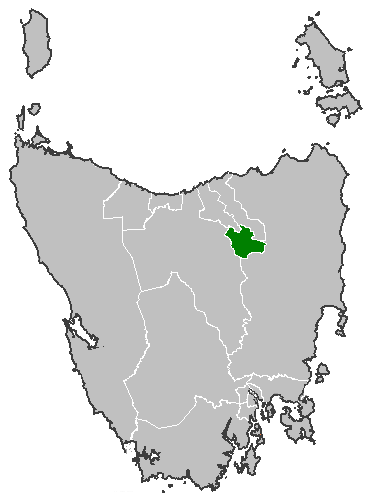
Paterson Electorate

The electoral division of Paterson was one of the 15 electorates or 'seats' in the Tasmanian Legislative Council (upper house) from 1999 to 2008 when a redistribution saw it reverted to its original name of Launceston.

The electorate itself includes most of the Launceston city area. However, not all Launceston suburbs are a part of Paterson some like Mowbray, Rocherlea, Ravenswood are part of the electoral division of Windermere. Others including West Launceston, Riverside, Trevallyn and Summerhill are part of the electoral division of Rosevears. The rest of the city falls in Paterson.

The rural properties just outside Launceston at Western Junction and Breadalbane are also included in the division.

The divisions uses much of its western border as the South Esk River, its Southern border is Illawarra Road and the entrance to Perth. Much of its eastern border is the Northern Midlands council and White Hills road.

== History ==
Paterson was created in 1999 after the size of the Tasmanian Legislative council was reduced from 19 members to 15. The former Division of Launceston was incorporated into Paterson. The central business area of Launceston which was part of the Division of Cornwall also became part of Paterson. Initially submissions hoped to have most Launceston suburbs within the electorate, however the tribunal ruled that there were too many differing community values so Riverside, Trevallyn, West Launceston, Summerhill were placed in Rosevears. The Eastern suburbs formally part of Westmorland became part of Windermere.

The electorate took its name after Patersonia which was the old name of Launceston. The electorate was held by Independent and President of the Legislative Council Don Wing. Wing was first elected to Launceston in 1982 and has held it since then.

The last Paterson election, held in 2005, Don Wing was the only nominated candidate and was declared elected without a poll.

== Members ==
Member	Party	Period
Don Wing	Independent	1999–2008

== See also ==
- Electoral division of Launceston
