= William Fry (Tasmanian politician) =

Australian politician (1912–1965)

William Hector Maxwell Fry (22 August 1912 – 19 December 1965) was an Australian politician.

He was born in Launceston. In 1958 he was elected to the Tasmanian Legislative Council as the Liberal member for Launceston. He served until his death in 1965, although he quit the Liberal Party some time during his term.

Tasmanian Legislative Council
Preceded by Lucy Grounds	Member for Launceston; 1958–1965	Succeeded by John Orchard
