= Walter Gellibrand =

Australian politician

Walter Angus Bethune Gellibrand (17 October 1832 – 5 November 1909) was a politician in colonial Tasmania, President of the Tasmanian Legislative Council from 1884 to 1889.

Gellibrand was born in Derwent Park, Van Diemen's Land (later renamed Tasmania), brother of Thomas and William who both became members of the Tasmanian House of Assembly.

Walter Gellibrand was elected to the Tasmanian Legislative Council for Derwent on 8 December 1871. Gellibrand was also a member of the Fisheries Board. Gellibrand was President of the Tasmanian Legislative Council from 1 July 1884 to 9 July 1889. He left the Parliament on 7 May 1901 after losing his bid to be re-elected.

Gellibrand died in Hobart, Tasmania on 5 November 1909.
