= William Young (Tasmanian politician) =

Australian politician

William Thomson Young CBE JP (22 March 1912 – 18 October 2012) was an Australian politician.

Born in Scotland, he was appointed a Commander of the Order of the British Empire (CBE) in 1971, for services as Warden of the Municipality of Burnie. Also in that year he was elected to the Tasmanian Legislative Council as the independent member for West Devon. He had previously contested the federal seat of Braddon for the Liberal Party in 1961. Young died in October 2012.

Tasmanian Legislative Council
Preceded by Walter Davis	Member for West Devon; 1971–1983	Succeeded by Hugh Hiscutt
