= Mervyn Lakin =

Australian politician (1888–1954)

Mervyn George Lakin (9 November 1888 – 19 June 1954) was an Australian politician.

He was born in Launceston. In May 1954 he was elected to the Tasmanian Legislative Council as the independent member for Mersey, but he died the following month, having served one of the shortest terms in the history of the Legislative Council.

Tasmanian Legislative Council
Preceded by Alexander Lillico	Member for Mersey; 1954	Succeeded by Hector McFie
