= William Robinson (Tasmanian politician) =

Australian politician (1879–1960)

William Robinson (17 July 1879 – 16 September 1960) was an Australian politician.

He was born in Lefroy, Tasmania. In 1942 he was elected to the Tasmanian Legislative Council as one of the independent members for Launceston. In 1946 the two-member seat was split and Robinson became the member for Cornwall. He held the seat until his defeat in 1948. Robinson died in Latrobe in 1960.

Tasmanian Legislative Council
Preceded by Alexander Evans	Member for Launceston; 1942–1946; Served alongside: George McElwee	Succeeded by Richard Green
New seat	Member for Cornwall; 1946–1948	Succeeded by Margaret McIntyre
