= Alexander Lillico =

Australian politician (1872–1966)

Sir Alexander Lillico (26 December 1872 – 14 December 1966) was a Tasmanian politician. He was an Independent member of the Tasmanian Legislative Council from 1924 to 1954, representing Mersey. He was created a Knight Bachelor in the New Year Honours List of 1962.

== Early life and education ==
Alexander Lillico was born on 26 December 1872 at Lillico's Siding, Tasmania, the son of farmer, Hugh Lillico and his wife, Mary Elliot Lillico (née Robson). Lillico attended Don State School.

== Career ==
Lillico worked as miner at Zeehan for two years. He served as a member of the Penguin Municipal Council from 1906 to 1909, and a member of the Devonport Municipal Council member from 1914 to 1920.

In 1924, he became a member of the Tasmanian Legislative Council for Mersey; a role in which he served until 1954.

Lillico was knighted in the Queen's New Years Honours of 1962 for public service.

== Personal life and death ==
Lillico married Frances Emma Vertigan on 10 June 1896 at Wesleyan Church, Norfolk Creek, near Forth. The couple had three sons, including Alexander Elliot Lillico, who became an Australian senator.

Lillico died on 14 December 1966 at Latrobe, Tasmania, two weeks shy of his 94th birthday. He had been predeceased by his wife in 1961.

Tasmanian Legislative Council
Preceded by Hubert Nichols	Member for Mersey; 1924–1954	Succeeded by Mervyn Lakin
