= Don Marriott =

Australian politician

Donald Keith Marriott (10 February 1916 – 1989) was an Australian politician.

He was born in Tyenna, Tasmania. In 1961 he was elected to the Tasmanian Legislative Council as the Labor member for Derwent. He served one term, until his defeat in 1967. Marriott died in 1989.

Tasmanian Legislative Council
Preceded by Joseph Dixon	Member for Derwent; 1961–1967	Succeeded by Joseph Dixon
