= Ray Shipp =

Australian politician (1925–2019)

Raymond William Shipp (27 September 1925 – 28 October 2019) was an Australian politician.

He was elected to the Tasmanian Legislative Council as the independent member for Launceston in 1968, serving until his defeat in 1982.

Shipp died on 28 October 2019 aged 94.

Tasmanian Legislative Council
Preceded by John Orchard	Member for Launceston; 1968–1982	Succeeded by Don Wing
