= Geoffrey Green (politician) =

Australian politician

Geoffrey Hewett Green (15 March 1901 – 21 April 1959) was an Australian politician.

He was born in Launceston. In 1946 he was elected to the Tasmanian Legislative Council as the independent member for Cambridge; however, Cambridge was transferred to Monmouth the same day and Green became Monmouth's MLC. He was elected President of the Council in 1955 and served until his death in Melbourne in 1959.

Tasmanian Legislative Council
| Preceded by Sir Rupert Shoobridge | President of the Tasmanian Legislative Council; 1955–1959 | Succeeded by Henry Baker |
| Preceded by Joe Darling | Member for Cambridge; 1946 | Abolished |
| New seat | Member for Monmouth; 1946–1959 | Succeeded by Louis Bisdee |
