= Elliot Lillico =

Australian politician (1905–1994)

- Lillico in 1972

Senator for Tasmania
- In office 1 July 1959 – 11 April 1974

Personal details
- Born: 5 September 1905 Penguin, Tasmania, Australia
- Died: 1 November 1994 (aged 89) Deloraine, Tasmania, Australia
- Party: Liberal
- Spouse: Gladys Mayo (m. 1928; died 1987)
- Relations: Alexander Lillico (father); Mark Baker (great-nephew)
- Occupation: Farmer

Alexander Elliot Davidson Lillico (5 September 1905 – 1 November 1994) was an Australian politician and farmer. He was a member of the Liberal Party and served as a senator for Tasmania from 1958 to 1974. He was earlier a member of the Tasmanian Legislative Council from 1943 to 1958, representing the seat of Meander.

== Early life ==
Lillico was born on 5 September 1905 in Penguin, Tasmania. He was the son of Frances Emma (née Vertigan) and Alexander Lillico. His father, a farmer, was elected to the Tasmanian Legislative Council in 1924.

Lillico attended the state school in Don and went on to Devonport High School. He also briefly boarded at Scotch College, Melbourne. After returning to Tasmania he worked on dairy and potato farms before taking up land at Wilmot where he established a beef cattle farm.

== State politics ==
Lillico was a member of the Kentish Council from 1934 until 1960 and became its youngest ever warden in 1936 at the age of 30. He was elected warden on three occasions.

In 1943, Lillico was elected to the Tasmanian Legislative Council as the member for Meander^{,} He sat as an independent in accordance with its generally non-partisan character. He joined his father in parliament, apparently one of the first instances in Australia of a father and son sitting together in the same chamber of a parliament. Lillico was a prominent Tasmanian opponent of the federal Labor Party governments. He campaigned for the "No" vote in the 1944, 1946 and 1948 federal referendums, viewing the proposals as an overreach of federal government power. He resigned his seat in 1958 after being endorsed as a Liberal Party candidate.

== Politics ==
Undated photo

At the 1958 federal election, Lillico was elected to a six-year Senate term commencing on 1 July 1959. He was re-elected at the 1964 and 1970 half-Senate elections. His final term was cut short by a double dissolution. He opted not to contest the 1974 election, anticipating that he would be denied preselection.

In the Senate, Lillico was known for his independence and regularly crossed the floor to vote against his party. According to a 2019 study, he crossed the floor on 21 occasions, the ninth-most of any member of parliament since 1950. Notable instances included voting against the Menzies government's "nexus" referendum bill in 1965 and voting with the opposition to pass a motion calling for the release of records relating to the VIP aircraft affair of 1967.

Lillico spoke regularly on matters relating to primary industry. In 1970 he became an inaugural member of the Standing Committee on Primary and Secondary Industry and Trade.

== Personal life ==
Lillico married Gladys Mayo in 1928, with whom he had three children. He was widowed in 1987 and died in Deloraine, Tasmania, on 1 November 1994. His great-nephew Mark Baker was elected to the House of Representatives in 2004.

Tasmanian Legislative Council
Preceded by Percy Best	Member for Meander; 1943–1958	Succeeded by Charles Best
