= Charles Batt =

Australian politician (1928–2007)

Charles Leo Batt OAM (31 December 1928 – 27 October 2007), Australian politician, was a Labor member of the Tasmanian House of Assembly from 1974 to 1976, then a member of the Legislative Council from 1979 to 1995.

Born and raised in Tasmania, Batt was first elected to the House of Assembly on 26 July 1974 representing the electorate of Wilmot (now Lyons), where he served on the Public Accounts Committee, but was defeated at the next election on 11 December 1976.

On 26 May 1979, he was elected to the Legislative Council, the Tasmanian upper house, representing the electorate of Derwent. From 1989 to 1992 he was the leader for the government in the Legislative Council, and he retired from politics on 27 May 1995.

He received the National Medal in 1978. He was awarded the Medal of the Order of Australia in the Australia Day honours in 2001, for community service through sports clubs, local government and the Tasmanian parliament, and received the Australian Centenary Medal in the same year.

He managed his family's sheep farming property in the Tasmanian Midlands, and died on 27 October 2007.

Tasmanian Legislative Council
Preceded by Joseph Dixon	Member for Derwent; 1979–1995	Succeeded by Michael Aird
