= Alby Broadby =

Australian politician (1917–2012)

Albert James "Alby" Broadby (10 August 1917 – 16 November 2012) was an Australian politician.

He was born in Queenstown. In 1968 he was elected to the Tasmanian Legislative Council as the independent member for Gordon. He was President of the Council from 1984 to 1988, when he retired from politics.

Tasmanian Legislative Council
Preceded by Harry Braid	President of the Tasmanian Legislative Council; 1984–1988	Succeeded by George Shaw
Preceded by Thomas d'Alton	Member for Gordon; 1968–1988	Succeeded by Peter Schulze
