= Rupert Shoobridge =

Australian politician

Sir Rupert Oakley Shoobridge (25 January 1883 – 5 November 1962) was an Australian politician.

He was born in Hobart. He had an extensive political pedigree: his father, Louis Shoobridge, was also a state politician while his mother was the daughter of Sir Philip Fysh, a former Premier of Tasmania. In 1937 he was elected to the Tasmanian Legislative Council as the independent member for Derwent, succeeding his father. Appointed Chair of Committees in 1944, he was elected President of the Council in 1946 and was knighted in 1947. He retired from politics in 1955 and died in Hobart in 1962. His son Louis would also serve in the Legislative Council.

Tasmanian Legislative Council
Preceded by Charles Eady	President of the Tasmanian Legislative Council; 1946–1955	Succeeded by Geoffrey Green
Preceded by Louis Shoobridge	Member for Derwent; 1937–1955	Succeeded by Joseph Dixon
