= John Orchard (Australian politician) =

Australian politician (1906–1995)

John Raymond Orchard (29 March 1906 – 20 June 1995) was an Australian politician.

He was born in Launceston. He received a Bachelor of Arts in 1929 and a Master of Arts in 1942. In 1948, he was elected to the Tasmanian House of Assembly as a Liberal member for Bass. In 1954, he resigned to contest Cornwall in the Legislative Council, winning the seat. He resigned in 1961, but returned as the member for Launceston in 1966. He was forced to vacate his seat in 1968; his disqualification was removed by act of parliament, but he was defeated in the by-election. He published his autobiography, Not to Yield, in 1982.

Tasmanian Legislative Council
Preceded by Ernest Record	Member for Cornwall; 1954–1961	Succeeded by Geoffrey Foot
Preceded by William Fry	Member for Launceston; 1966–1968	Succeeded by Ray Shipp
