= Harry Braid =

Australian politician (1917–2001)

Henry William Braid (11 June 1917 – 11 October 2001) was an Australian politician.

Braid was born in Staverton, Tasmania; his cousin, Ian Braid, was also a politician. In 1972 he was elected to the Tasmanian Legislative Council as the independent member for Mersey. He was President of the Council from 1983 to 1984. He retired in 1990. His daughter was Sue Napier, state Liberal Party leader from 1999 to 2001.

Tasmanian Legislative Council
Preceded by Bill Hodgman	President of the Tasmanian Legislative Council; 1983–1984	Succeeded by Alby Broadby
Preceded by Hector McFie	Member for Mersey; 1972–1990	Succeeded by Geoff Squibb
