= Ken Lowrie =

Australian politician

Kenneth Francis Lowrie

Personal details
- Political party: independent

Kenneth Francis Lowrie OBE OAM (4 September 1926 – 19 April 2012) was an Australian politician.

He was born in Hobart, and was mayor of Glenorchy from 1965 to 1975. In 1968, he was elected to the Tasmanian Legislative Council as the independent member for Buckingham. He was Chair of Committees from 1980 to 1982, and from 1982 to 1986 was Leader of the Government in the Legislative Council, although he did not join the Liberal Party. He was defeated in 1986.

Lowrie was awarded the Medal of the Order of Australia (OAM) in the 1998 Australia Day Honours for "service to the community, to local government and to the sport of lawn bowls". In September 2000 he was awarded the Australian Sports Medal for "service to lawn bowls and administration".

Tasmanian Legislative Council
Preceded by James Connolly	Member for Buckingham; 1968–1986	Succeeded by Doug Lowe
