= William Hart (Tasmanian politician) =

Australian politician (1825–1904)

William Hart (1825 – 7 February 1904) was a Tasmanian businessman and politician born in England. He amassed considerable wealth and served in all three tiers of Government: Local, House of Assembly and Legislative Council.

== History ==
Hart was born in London a son of William Doubleday Hart (ca.1801 – 1 August 1847?) of Leicestershire who, with his family, emigrated to Launceston, Tasmania on the Helen Mather in 1833 and established himself as a hardware dealer.

Young William was educated at Launceston and for several years worked in his father's business. Around 1846 he and his brother Frank (2 January 1833 – 1 September 1907) started in business on their own account as "W. & F. Hart", which partnership was dissolved around 1871 and later became "W. Hart & Sons" of Charles Street, Launceston. William transferred the business to his sons in 1886.

He was one of the original investors in the Mount Bischoff Tin Mining Company, and its chairman of directors for many years. He was one of the purchasers of the Tasmania Gold Mine at Beaconsfield, which was formed into a company in 1877, was a director up until the mine was sold, and was one of the four appointees to represent the original shareholders on the directorate of the new company.

With his partner in the Tasmania Mine, William Dawson Grubb, in December 1877, he was one of the buyers of the land, plant and mining lease of the Tamar Hematite Iron Company. The buyers, four wealthy Tasmanian politicians and a Launceston merchant, were then able to obtain a valuable gold mining lease adjacent to the Tasmania lease, for a small outlay. They did that under the provisions of new mining legislation, upon which the politicians had just voted.

He was the owner of considerable property in the city. Upon the failure of the Bank of Van Dienmen's Land Mr. Hart was elected by the shareholders as one of the liquidators. He was a director of the Commercial Bank of Tasmania, and was on the boards of many other commercial and business institutions.

== Public life ==
For some years he acted as a warden of the Launceston Marine Board, and was also chairman of the Chamber of Commerce. In 1858 he was elected to the Launceston City Council, serving as alderman from 1858 to 1875. He filled the Mayoral chair in 1863 and 1869.

He entered the political arena as member for Central Launceston in the House of Assembly on 30 May 1877, and held the seat until December 1885, when he retired to contest the Launceston seat in the Legislative Council. He was successful, being elected on 21 December of that year, and he continued to represent the constituency up to the time of his death. Hart suffered ill health the last two years of his life and was unable during the last session of Parliament to take his seat in the House.

He was an active member of the Wesleyan Church, and for many years superintendent of the Sunday school. He was a generous giver to many religious and charitable societies. His estate was valued at around £500,000.

== Family ==
William Hart had four brothers: Frank, Anthony (ca.1865 – 4 July 1908), John and Frederick. Third sister Sarah died 1860 aged 4; Fourth sister Jane Elizabeth

He married Mary (1826 – 7 January 1883) in Launceston in 1847; they had seven children. He married again, to the widow Emma Noble (ca.1835 – 19 June 1931) on 25 November 1884. Among their children were:

- Eldest son William jun. (ca.1850 – 27 February 1878) married Florence Morey Clewer (ca.1859 – June 1878) on 8 November 1876
- Florence Mary Clewer "Florrie" Hart (8 May 1878 – 13 May 1938), married the cricketer Clem Hill on 17 January 1905.
- Eldest daughter Mary Ann married Matthew Tyson on 8 February 1882
- Second son Percy married Florence Eleanor Joynt on 26 February 1885
- Benjamin William married Amindia A. J. Smith on 23 January 1887
