= Louis Bisdee =

Australian politician

Louis Fenn Bisdee (22 September 1910 – 16 November 2010) was an Australian politician.

== Career ==
He was born in Tasmania. In 1959 he was elected to the Tasmanian Legislative Council as the independent member for Monmouth. He served until he was defeated in 1981. Bisdee died in Hobart in 2010 at the age of 100.

Tasmanian Legislative Council
Preceded by Geoffrey Green	Member for Monmouth; 1959–1981	Succeeded by Stephen Wilson
