= Henry Baker (Australian politician) =

Australian politician

Sir Henry Baker KCMG, DSO
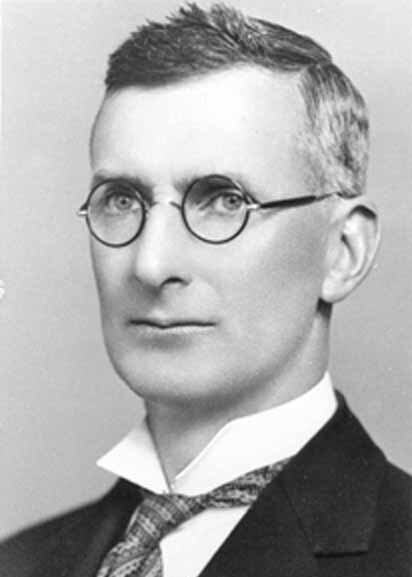
- Baker c. 1930

President of the Tasmanian Legislative Council
- In office 2 June 1959 – 20 July 1968
- Preceded by: Geoffrey Green
- Succeeded by: Louis Shoobridge

Member of the Tasmanian Legislative Council for Queenborough
- In office 8 May 1948 – 20 July 1968
- Preceded by: William Strutt
- Succeeded by: Walter Davis

Leader of the Opposition of Tasmania
- In office 8 May 1936 – 25 February 1946
- Preceded by: Sir Walter Lee
- Succeeded by: Neil Campbell

Member of the Tasmanian House of Assembly for Franklin
- In office 30 May 1928 – 23 November 1946

Personal details
- Born: 1 September 1890 Liverpool, England
- Died: 20 July 1968 (aged 77) Sandy Bay, Tasmania, Australia
- Party: Nationalist (to 1945); Liberal (from 1945)
- Other political affiliations: Independent (from 1948)
- Spouse: Effie Sharp (m. 1922)
- Education: University of Tasmania
- Occupation: Barrister

Military service
- Allegiance: Australia
- Branch/service: Australian Imperial Force
- Years of service: 1915–1919
- Rank: Lieutenant
- Unit: 13th Battalion
- Battles/wars: First World War
- Awards: Distinguished Service Order; Mentioned in Despatches

Sir Henry Seymour Baker KCMG, DSO (1 September 1890 – 20 July 1968) was an Australian politician and lawyer. He served in the Parliament of Tasmania for nearly 40 years, initially as a Nationalist and Liberal in the House of Assembly (1928–1946), where he spent periods as attorney-general (1928–1934) and leader of the opposition (1936–1946). He later served in the Legislative Council (1948–1968), including as president (1959–1968). He was born in England and spent most of his childhood in New Zealand, arriving in Australia as a teenager.

== Early life ==
Baker was born on 1 September 1890 in Liverpool, England. He was the son of Lydia Charlotte (née Lee) and Sidney James Baker; his father was a Congregationalist minister.

Baker and his family moved to New Zealand when he was a child, where he attended Palmerston North Boys' High School. The family moved to Australia in 1907, settling in Launceston, Tasmania. After leaving school he began working as a journalist for the Daily Post in Hobart. He was a founding member and the inaugural treasurer of the Tasmanian branch of the Australian Journalists' Association. Baker also studied law at the University of Tasmania, graduating Bachelor of Laws in 1913 and Master of Laws in 1915. He served his articles of clerkship with the Hobart firm of Simmons, Wolfhagen, Simmons and Walch.

== Military service ==
In February 1915, Baker enlisted in the Australian Imperial Force (AIF) and was assigned to the 13th Battalion. He was initially attached to the Australian General Hospital Convalescent Depot in England, before joining the 4th Field Ambulance and seeing active service in Egypt and on the Western Front. He was promoted lieutenant in August 1917.

Baker was awarded the Distinguished Service Order (DSO) for his actions at Le Verguier in September 1918 during the lead-up to the Battle of St Quentin Canal. Despite a wounded leg, during an advance he captured twenty German prisoners while operating in fog and under machine-gun and artillery fire. He was later invalided to London with influenza before being repatriated to Australia in February 1919.

An extensive collection of Baker's wartime diaries, photographs, and correspondence is held by the State Library of Tasmania.

== Legal career ==
Baker was called to the bar in 1919 and worked in Owen Dixon's Melbourne chambers for a period. He was later a partner in the firms of Griffiths, Crisp & Baker (with Philip Lewis Griffiths) and Finlay, Watchorn, Baker & Solomon. He served terms as president of the Southern Law Society (1939–1941) and the Southern Tasmanian Bar Association (1953–1956).

== Politics ==
Baker was elected to the Tasmanian House of Assembly at the 1928 state election, as one of the Nationalist candidates in the multi-member seat of Franklin. He was immediately appointed attorney-general and education minister in John McPhee's government. He served until the Nationalist government's defeat at the 1934 election, by which time Walter Lee had succeeded McPhee as premier.

On 8 May 1936, Baker was elected as Nationalist leader and leader of the opposition, following Lee's retirement for health reasons. He was viewed as less charismatic than Australian Labor Party (ALP) premier Albert Ogilvie, with his colleague John Ockerby emerging as a more strident critic of Ogilvie in parliament. At the 1937 state election, Baker and the Nationalists received endorsements from Hobart's Mercury and Launceston's Examiner, with the latter describing him as "sound, cautious, but presenting a progressive policy". However, Ogilvie and the ALP won a landslide victory.

Baker led the Nationalist Party to a further defeat at the 1941 state election. He became the inaugural state parliamentary leader of the Liberal Party of Australia upon its creation in 1945. Later in the year he announced he would retire from the House of Assembly at the next state election. He was succeeded as Liberal leader by his deputy Neil Campbell on 25 February 1946.

Baker returned to parliamentary politics in 1948 as an independent member for Queenborough in the nonpartisan Tasmanian Legislative Council. He was elected President of the Council in 1959, serving until his death in 1968. He was created a Knight Commander of the Order of St Michael and St George in 1960.

== Personal life ==
In 1920, Baker married Effie Millicent Sharp, with whom he had four children. He died in Sandy Bay on 20 July 1968, aged 77, and was granted a state funeral.

Parliament of Tasmania
| Preceded by Walter Lee | Leader of the Opposition; 1936–1945 | Succeeded by Neil Campbell |
Tasmanian Legislative Council
| Preceded by William Strutt | Member for Queenborough; 1948–1968 | Succeeded by Louis Shoobridge |
| Preceded by Geoffrey Green | President of the Tasmanian Legislative Council; 1959–1968 | Succeeded by Walter Davis |
