= Tasmanian Legislative Council electoral divisions =

Australian election constituencies

The Tasmanian Legislative Council has fifteen single member constituencies, called divisions.

== Current divisions ==
The fifteen Tasmanian Legislative Council divisions as of the 2016–17 redistribution are:

Derwent	Map of the Tasmanian Legislative Council divisions, Derwent highlighted in crimson.
Elwick	Map of the Tasmanian Legislative Council divisions, Elwick highlighted in crimson.
Hobart	Map of the Tasmanian Legislative Council divisions, Hobart highlighted in crimson.
Huon	Map of the Tasmanian Legislative Council divisions, Huon highlighted in crimson.
Launceston	Map of the Tasmanian Legislative Council divisions, Launceston highlighted in crimson.
McIntyre	Map of the Tasmanian Legislative Council divisions, McIntyre highlighted in crimson.
Mersey	Map of the Tasmanian Legislative Council divisions, Mersey highlighted in crimson.
Montgomery	Map of the Tasmanian Legislative Council divisions, Montgomery highlighted in crimson.

Murchison	Map of the Tasmanian Legislative Council divisions, Murchison highlighted in crimson.
Nelson	Map of the Tasmanian Legislative Council divisions, Nelson highlighted in crimson.
Pembroke	Map of the Tasmanian Legislative Council divisions, Pembroke highlighted in crimson.
Prosser	Map of the Tasmanian Legislative Council divisions, Prosser highlighted in crimson.
Rosevears	Map of the Tasmanian Legislative Council divisions, Rosevears highlighted in crimson.
Rumney	Map of the Tasmanian Legislative Council divisions, Rumney highlighted in crimson.
Windermere	Map of the Tasmanian Legislative Council divisions, Windermere highlighted in crimson.

== Abolished divisions ==
- Apsley (1999–2017)
- Brighton (1851–1856)
- Buckingham (1851–1999)
- Cambridge (1856–1946)
- Campbell Town (1851–1856)
- Cornwall (1851–1856, 1946–1999)
- Cumberland (1851–1856)
- Emu Bay (1997–1999)
- Glamorgan (1855–1856)
- Gordon (1899–1999)
- Hobart Town (1851–1857)
- Jordan (1856–1885)
- Leven (1997–1999)
- Longford (1853–1885)
- Macquarie (1886–1999)
- Meander (1856–1997)
- Monmouth (1946–1999)
- Morven (1855–1856)
- Newdegate (1946–1999)
- New Norfolk (1851–1856)
- North Esk (1855–1901)
- Paterson (1999–2008)
- Queenborough (1947–1999)
- Richmond (1851–1856)
- Roland (1997–1999)
- Rowallan (1999–2008)
- Russell (1885–1999)
- Sorell (1851–1856)
- South Esk (1856–1999)
- Tamar (1856–1997)
- Wellington (1999–2008)
- Westbury (1851–1856)
- West Devon (1947–1997)
- Western Tiers (2008–2017)
- Westmorland (1885–1999)

== See also ==
- Tasmanian House of Assembly electoral divisions
