= James Bell Connolly =

Australian politician (1892–1970)

James Bell Connolly (21 January 1892 – 14 September 1970) was an Australian politician.

He was born in Newtown, Tasmania. In 1948 he was elected to the Tasmanian Legislative Council as the Labor member for Buckingham. He served until his retirement in 1968.

Tasmanian Legislative Council
Preceded by Bill Wedd	Member for Buckingham; 1948–1968	Succeeded by Ken Lowrie
