= Louis Shoobridge Jr. =

Australian politician

Louis Manton Shoobridge (25 October 1920 – 20 May 2005) was an Australian politician.

He was born in New Town in Hobart, the son of Sir Rupert Shoobridge. In 1968 he was elected to the Tasmanian Legislative Council as the independent member for Queenborough. He held the seat until his defeat in 1971.

Tasmanian Legislative Council
Preceded by Sir Henry Baker	Member for Queenborough; 1968–1971	Succeeded by Bill Hodgman
