= Thomas D'Alton =

Australian politician and diplomat (1895–1968)

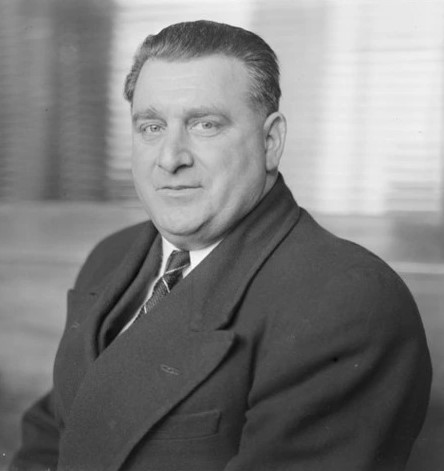
- Portrait of D'Alton as high commissioner to New Zealand, October 1945
- Born: Thomas George De Largie D'Alton; 8 December 1895; Warracknabeal, Victoria
- Died: 7 May 1968 (aged 72); South Hobart, Tasmania, Australia
- Occupations: Politician, diplomat

Thomas George De Largie D'Alton (8 December 1895 – 7 May 1968) was an Australian politician and diplomat. He was born in Warracknabeal in Victoria. In 1931, D'Alton was elected to the Tasmanian House of Assembly as a Labor member for Darwin. D'Alton was a minister from 1934 to 1943, including the Minister for Agriculture from December 1939 to November 1943; and he served as the deputy premier between 1941 and 1943.

In 1943 Herbert Evatt saw a need for a High Commissioner in Wellington to coordinate views (a new post) and chose the "colourful figure" D'Alton, who however chose to retain his seat and salary in the Tasmanian parliament. Three months after arriving, he got into a punch-up with the landlord of the Post Office Hotel, Wellington. Questions from the opposition in the federal parliament asked if he was a worthy reply to boxer Bob Fitzsimmons (the "Freckled Wonder"), who moved to Australia from New Zealand.

In 1946 he was the subject of a Royal Commission alleging corruption—the commissioner, Sir Richard Kirby, dismissed two charges of corruption but found that D'Alton had accepted bribes for "services improperly rendered" on two occasions. In spite of the findings, D'Alton was elected to the Tasmanian Legislative Council in 1947, again representing Labor for the seat of Gordon, and served until his death in South Hobart in 1968.

Tasmanian House of Assembly
Preceded by James Belton	Member for Darwin; 1931–1944	Succeeded by Michael Adye Smith
Political offices
Preceded by Claude James	Chief Secretary of Tasmania; 1934–1939	Succeeded by Edward Brooker
Preceded by Edmund Dwyer-Gray	Deputy Premier of Tasmania; 1941–1943	Succeeded by Edward Brooker
Diplomatic posts
New title Position established	High Commissioner of Australia to New Zealand; 1943–1946	Succeeded by Roden Cutler
Tasmanian Legislative Council
Preceded by James McDonald	Member for Gordon; 1947–1968	Succeeded by Alby Broadby
