= Geoffrey Foot (politician) =

Australian politician (1915–2009)

Sir Geoffrey James Foot (20 July 1915 – 4 May 2009) was a Tasmanian politician. He was born in Launceston, and served as a member of the Tasmanian Legislative Council for the seat of Cornwall from 1961 to 1972. He was knighted in 1984.

Foot was a notable Christian, serving as President of the Conference of Churches of Christ in Victoria and Tasmania in 1980. He was also National Treasurer of the Bible Society of Australia for many years.

Tasmanian Legislative Council
Preceded by John Orchard	Member for Cornwall; 1961–1972	Succeeded by Frank King
