= Daniel Hitchcock (politician) =

Australian politician

Daniel Hitchcock (3 January 1908 – April 1996) was an Australian politician.

He was born in Cooma in Victoria. In 1960 he was elected to the Tasmanian Legislative Council as the independent member for Tamar. He held the seat until his retirement in 1979.

Tasmanian Legislative Council
Preceded by Neil Campbell	Member for Tamar; 1960–1979	Succeeded by Reg Hope
