= Brian Miller (Australian politician) =

Australian politician

Brian Kirkwall Miller AM (30 January 1921 – 6 June 2014) was an Australian politician. Born in Queenstown, he was elected to the Tasmanian Legislative Council in 1957 as the Labor member for Newdegate. He held various ministerial portfolios and led the Government in the council from 1972 to 1982. In 1986 he resigned from the council to contest the House of Assembly election, but he was unsuccessful.

In the 1994 Queen's Birthday Honours Miller was made a Member of the Order of Australia for "service to the Tasmanian Parliament and to the community".

Tasmanian Legislative Council
Preceded by George Gray	Member for Newdegate; 1957–1986	Succeeded by Ross Ginn
