= Walter Davis (politician) =

Australian politician (1915–1971)

Walter John Torley Davis (18 October 1915 – 7 October 1971) was an Australian politician.

He was born in Moonee Ponds in Melbourne. In 1953 he was elected to the Tasmanian Legislative Council as the independent member for West Devon. He was elected President of the Council in 1968, serving until his death in 1971.

Tasmanian Legislative Council
Preceded by Sir Henry Baker	President of the Tasmanian Legislative Council; 1968–1971	Succeeded by Hector McFie
Preceded by Hector McFie	Member for West Devon; 1953–1971	Succeeded by William Young
