= Hector McFie =

Australian politician (1898–1982)

Hector McFie (3 October 1898 – 23 May 1982) was an Australian politician. He was born in Devonport, Tasmania and held a Diploma of Mechanical Engineering. In 1954 he was elected to the Tasmanian Legislative Council as the Independent member for Mersey. He served as Chair of Committees from 1968 to 1971 and President of the Council from 12 October 1971 to 25 May 1972, when he retired from politics.

Tasmanian Legislative Council
| Preceded by Walter Davis | President of the Tasmanian Legislative Council; 1971–1972 | Succeeded by Charles Fenton |
| Preceded by Mervyn Lakin | Member for Mersey; 1954–1972 | Succeeded by Harry Braid |
