= Joseph Dixon (Australian politician) =

Australian politician

Joseph Henry Dixon OAM (19 March 1911 – 3 August 2002) was an Australian politician.

He was born in York in England. In 1955 he was elected to the Tasmanian Legislative Council as the independent member for Derwent. He was defeated in 1961 but returned to the Council in 1967, serving as Chair of Committees from 1972 until his second defeat in 1979. He died in Hobart.

Tasmanian Legislative Council
Preceded by Sir Rupert Shoobridge	Member for Derwent; 1955–1961	Succeeded by Don Marriott
Preceded by Don Marriott	Member for Derwent; 1967–1979	Succeeded by Charles Batt
