= Electoral division of West Devon =

Former electoral division in the Tasmanian Legislative Council

The Electoral division of West Devon was an electoral division in the Tasmanian Legislative Council of Australia. It existed from 1946, when it was created from rural areas of Mersey, to 1997, when it was renamed Emu Bay.

== Members ==
| Member | Party | Period |
|---|---|---|
| Arthur Tattersall | Independent | 1946–1953 |
| Walter Davis | Independent | 1953–1971 |
| William Young | Independent | 1971–1983 |
| Hugh Hiscutt | Independent | 1983–1995 |
| Des Hiscutt | Independent | 1995–1997 |

== See also ==
- Tasmanian Legislative Council electoral divisions
