= Electoral division of Newdegate =

Former Tasmanian Legislative Council electoral division

The Electoral division of Newdegate was an electoral division in the Tasmanian Legislative Council of Australia. It existed from 1946, when the three-member seat of Hobart was split to create three single-member seats, to 1999, when it was abolished since the council was reduced from 19 to 15 seats. It took its name from Francis Newdegate, a former Governor of Tasmania.

== Members ==
Member	Party	Period
Dennis Lonergan	Independent	1946–1951
George Gray	Independent	1951–1957
Brian Miller	Labor	1957–1986
Ross Ginn	Independent	1986–1998
John White	Labor	1998–1999

== See also ==
- Tasmanian Legislative Council electoral divisions
