= Electoral division of Queenborough =

Tasmanian Legislative Council electoral division

The Electoral division of Queenborough was an electoral division in the Tasmanian Legislative Council of Australia. It existed from 1946, when the seat of Hobart was changed from three members to one, to 1999, when it was renamed Nelson.

== Members ==
Member	Party	Period
William Strutt	Independent	1946–1948
(Sir) Henry Baker	Independent	1948–1968
Louis Shoobridge	Independent	1968–1971
Bill Hodgman	Independent	1971–1983
John Stopp	Independent	1983–1995
Jim Wilkinson	Independent	1995–1999

== See also ==
- Tasmanian Legislative Council electoral divisions
