= Electoral division of Monmouth =

Former Tasmanian Legislative Council electoral division

The Electoral division of Monmouth was an electoral division in the Tasmanian Legislative Council of Australia. It existed from 1946, when it was created out of the amalgamation of Cambridge with parts of Macquarie, to 1999, when it was renamed Rumney.

== Members ==
Member	Party	Period
Geoffrey Green	Independent	1946–1959
Louis Bisdee	Independent	1959–1981
Stephen Wilson	Independent	1981–1999

== See also ==
- Tasmanian Legislative Council electoral divisions
