= Electoral division of Launceston =

Electoral division of the Tasmanian Legislative Council

Launceston Tasmania—Legislative Council
- Map showing the electoral division of Launceston, as of the 2017 periodic review.
- State: Tasmania
- Created: 1851
- MP: Rosemary Armitage
- Party: Independent
- Electors: 24,372 (2019)
- Area: 146 km^{2} (56.4 sq mi)
- Demographic: Provincial
- Federal electorate(s): Bass; Lyons
- Coordinates: 41.515°S 147.147°E
Electorates around Launceston:
Rosevears	Windermere; Rosevears	Windermere
McIntyre	Launceston	Windermere; McIntyre
McIntyre	McIntyre	McIntyre

The electoral division of Launceston is one of 15 electorates or seats in the Tasmanian Legislative Council, created in 2008.

The division of Launceston includes the Launceston city council suburbs of West Launceston, Summerhill, Kings Meadows, Prospect, Glen Dhu, Norwood and Youngtown. It also included the Meander Valley council areas of Prospect Vale and Blackstone Heights. Its southern border was shared with present-day Launceston city council, its northern the South Esk River and Bathurst Street in the central business district. Its western border was Lake Trevallyn.

A previous electoral division of Launceston existed until it was abolished in 1999. Most of the electorate was merged with the northern area of Macquarie to create Paterson. The suburbs of West Launceston, Trevallyn were merged with the existing Cornwall to create the Rosevears. A small area became part of Windermere. Paterson was eventually abolished in 2008 and replaced by the current electoral division of Launceston.

== Members ==
First incarnation (1851–1855)
Member	Party	Period
Richard Dry	Independent	1851–1855

Second incarnation (two members, 1855–1856)
Member	Party	Period	Member	Party	Period
Ronald Gunn	Independent	1855–1856	Adye Douglas	Independent	1855–1856

Third incarnation (two members, 1885–1946)
Member	Party	Period	Member	Party	Period
William Hart	Independent	1885–1904	vacant		1885–1886
William Hart	Independent	1885–1904	John Scott	Independent	1886–1890
William Hart	Independent	1885–1904	(Sir) Adye Douglas	Independent	1890–1904
Peter McCrackan	Independent	1904–1916	Charles Russen	Independent	1904–1914
Peter McCrackan	Independent	1904–1916	Tasman Shields	Independent	1915–1936
Frank Hart	Independent	1916–1940	Tasman Shields	Independent	1915–1936
Frank Hart	Independent	1916–1940	Alexander Evans	Independent	1936–1942
George McElwee	Labor	1940–1946	Alexander Evans	Independent	1936–1942
George McElwee	Labor	1940–1946	William Robinson	Independent	1942–1946

Fourth incarnation (1946–1999)
Member	Party	Period
Richard Green	Independent	1946–1950
Arthur Grounds	Labor	1950–1951
Lucy Grounds	Labor	1951–1958
William Fry	Liberal	1958–1965
John Orchard	Liberal	1966–1968
Ray Shipp	Independent	1968–1982
Don Wing	Independent	1982–1999
Fifth incarnation (2008–present)
Member	Party	Period
Don Wing	Independent	2008–2011
Rosemary Armitage	Independent	2011–present

== Election results ==
2023 Tasmanian Legislative Council periodic elections: Launceston
Party	Candidate	Votes	%	±%
Independent	Rosemary Armitage	15,548	78.23	+43.24
Greens	Cecily Rosol	4,327	21.77	+14.45
Total formal votes		19,875	95.12	−1.23
Informal votes		1,020	4.88	+1.23
Turnout		20,895	82.39	−1.83
Registered electors		25,361		
Independent hold				

== See also ==
- Electoral division of Paterson
- Tasmanian House of Assembly
