= Electoral division of Gordon =

Electoral division of the Tasmanian Legislative Council

The Electoral division of Gordon was an electoral division in the Tasmanian Legislative Council of Australia. It existed from 1899 to 1999, when it was abolished since the Council was reduced from 19 to 15 seats. It took its name from the Gordon River.

== Members ==
Member	Party	Period
Arthur Morrisby	Independent	1899–1916
James McDonald	Labor	1916–1922
Andrew Lawson	Independent	1922–1928
James McDonald	Labor	1928–1947
Thomas d'Alton	Labor	1947–1968
Alby Broadby	Independent	1968–1988
Peter Schulze	Independent	1988–1999

== See also ==
- Tasmanian Legislative Council electoral divisions
