= Electoral division of Cornwall =

Former electoral division of the Tasmanian Legislative Council

The electoral division of Cornwall was an electoral division in the Tasmanian Legislative Council of Australia. It was abolished in 1999 after the Legislative Council was reduced from 19 members to 15.

The former division was located on the western side of the Tamar River and central Launceston. Cornwall included Legana and the Launceston suburbs of Riverside and Trevallyn, South Launceston, East Launceston, Punchbowl and Sandhill.

Most of the electorate including Legana, Trevallyn, Riverside and Grinderwald were incorporated into the Division of Rosevears. However the central Launceston suburbs became part of Paterson. At the time of its abolition, Cornwall had 18,481 enrolled voters. Of these, 8,837 were transferred to Paterson and 10,281 were transferred Rosevears.

The last member of Cornwall was Ray Bailey.

== Members ==
Member	Party	Period
William Robinson	Independent	1946–1948
Margaret McIntyre	Independent	1948
Ernest Record	Independent	1948–1954
John Orchard	Liberal	1954–1961
Geoffrey Foot	Independent	1961–1972
Frank King	Independent	1972–1978
Mac Le Fevre	Independent	1978–1984
Robin McKendrick	Independent	1984–1990
Ray Bailey	Independent	1990–1999

== See also ==
- Cornwall Land District

== Notes ==
After 1999 Ray Bailey was made member for Rosevears. He retired in 2002.
