= Electoral division of Derwent =

Tasmanian Legislative Council electoral division

Derwent Tasmania—Legislative Council
- Map showing the electoral division of Derwent, as of the 2017 periodic review.
- State: Tasmania
- Created: 1871
- MP: Craig Farrell
- Party: Labor
- Namesake: River Derwent
- Electors: 25,637 (2019)
- Area: 12,184 km^{2} (4,704.3 sq mi)
- Demographic: Rural
- Federal electorate(s): Clark; Lyons
- Coordinates: 42.41°S 146.61°E
Electorates around Derwent:
Murchison	McIntyre	McIntyre
Murchison	Derwent	Prosser
Murchison	Huon	Rumney; Elwick

The electoral division of Derwent is one of the 15 electoral divisions in the Tasmanian Legislative Council. It is situated in the central south of the state.

The last boundary redistribution occurred in 2017. The total area of the division is 12,184 square kilometres (4,704 sq mi).

As of 31 January 2019, there were 25,637 enrolled voters in the division. The next election in the division is due in May 2027.

The division is named after the River Derwent and includes the Central Highlands and Derwent Valley local government areas, as well as some outer Hobart suburbs such as Bridgewater, Chigwell, Claremont, and towns such as Bothwell, Hamilton, Maydena, New Norfolk, and Westerway.

== Members ==
Member	Party	Term
William Langdon	Independent	1856–1871
Walter Gellibrand	Independent	1871–1901
Ellis Dean	Independent	1901–1920
Louis Shoobridge	Independent	1921–1937
(Sir) Rupert Shoobridge	Independent	1937–1955
Joseph Dixon	Independent	1955–1961
Don Marriott	Labor	1961–1967
Joseph Dixon	Independent	1967–1979
Charles Batt	Labor	1979–1995
Michael Aird	Labor	1995–2011
Craig Farrell	Labor	2011–present

== Election results ==
2021 Tasmanian Legislative Council periodic elections: Derwent
Party	Candidate	Votes	%	±%
Labor	Craig Farrell	10,069	49.09	−15.26
Liberal	Ben Shaw	8,385	40.88	+40.88
Animal Justice	Ivan Davis	2,059	10.04	+10.04
Total formal votes		20,513	94.4	+0.60
Informal votes		1,217	5.60	−0.60
Turnout		21,730	81.64	+1.46
Registered electors		26,618		
Two-party-preferred result
Labor	Craig Farrell	11,415	55.65	−8.69
Liberal	Ben Shaw	9,098	44.35	+44.35
Labor hold		Swing	–8.69	

== See also ==
- Tasmanian House of Assembly
