= Electoral division of Mersey =

Electoral division of the Tasmanian Legislative Council

Mersey Tasmania—Legislative Council
- Map showing the electoral division of Mersey, as of the 2017 periodic review.
- State: Tasmania
- MP: Mike Gaffney
- Party: Independent
- Namesake: Mersey River
- Electors: 27,668 (January 2019)
- Area: 732 km^{2} (282.6 sq mi)
- Demographic: Provincial
- Federal electorate: Braddon
- Coordinates: 41.237°S 146.521°E
Electorates around Mersey:
| Bass Strait | Bass Strait | Bass Strait |
| Montgomery | Mersey | Rosevears |
| Montgomery | McIntyre | Rosevears |

The electoral division of Mersey is one of the fifteen constituencies in the Tasmanian Legislative Council. The division covers an area of 732 km^{2}.

In January 2019, the division had 27,668 enrolled voters.

Mersey is named after the Mersey River that flows through Devonport.

The electorate of Mersey includes part of Latrobe and the city of Devonport, the localities of Spreyton, Turners Beach and Forth.

Its current member of parliament is independent Mike Gaffney, elected in 2009.

== Members ==
| Member | Party | Period |
|---|---|---|
| William Hawkes | Independent | 1871–1877 |
| William Moore | Independent | 1877–1885 |
| James Smith | Independent | 1886–1888 |
| John McCall | Independent | 1888–1901 |
| John Henry | Independent | 1901–1902 |
| Hubert Nichols | Independent | 1902–1924 |
| Alexander Lillico | Independent | 1924–1954 |
| Mervyn Lakin | Independent | 1954–1954 |
| Hector McFie | Independent | 1954–1972 |
| Harry Braid | Independent | 1972–1990 |
| Geoff Squibb | Independent | 1990–2003 |
| Norma Jamieson | Independent | 2003–2009 |
| Mike Gaffney | Independent | 2009–present |

== Election results ==
2021 Tasmanian Legislative Council periodic election: Mersey
| Party | Candidate | Votes | % | ±% |
|---|---|---|---|---|
| Independent | Mike Gaffney | unopposed | | |
| Independent hold | | Swing | | |

== See also ==
- Tasmanian House of Assembly
