= Members of the Tasmanian Legislative Council, 2017–2023 =

This is a list of members of the Tasmanian Legislative Council between 2017 and 2023. Terms of the Legislative Council did not coincide with Legislative Assembly elections, and members served six year terms, with a number of members facing election each year.

== Elections ==
Date	Electorates
6 May 2017	Launceston; Murchison; Rumney
4 November 2017	Pembroke (by-election)
5 May 2018	Hobart; Prosser
4 May 2019	Montgomery; Nelson; Pembroke
2 May 2020	Huon; Rosevears
1 May 2021	Derwent; Mersey; Windermere
7 May 2022	Elwick; McIntyre; Huon (by-election)
10 September 2022	Pembroke (by-election)

== Members ==
Name	Party	Division	Term in office
Hon Rosemary Armitage	Independent	Launceston	2011–present
Hon Robert Armstrong ^{[5]}	Independent	Huon	2014–2020
Hon Ivan Dean	Independent	Windermere	2003–2021
Hon Nick Duigan ^{[6]}	Liberal	Windermere	2021–present
Hon Luke Edmunds ^{[8]}	Labor	Pembroke	2022–present
Hon Craig Farrell ^{[6]}	Labor	Derwent	2011–present
Hon Kerry Finch ^{[5]}	Independent	Rosevears	2002–2020
Hon Ruth Forrest	Independent	Murchison	2005–present
Hon Mike Gaffney	Independent	Mersey	2009–present
Hon Dr Vanessa Goodwin ^{[2]}	Liberal	Pembroke	2009–2017
Hon Greg Hall	Independent	McIntyre^{[1]}	2001–2018
Hon Dean Harriss ^{[7]}	Independent	Huon	2022–present
Hon Leonie Hiscutt ^{[4]}	Liberal	Montgomery	2013–present
Hon Jane Howlett ^{[3]}	Liberal	Prosser	2018–2024
Hon Sarah Lovell	Labor	Rumney	2017–present
Hon Jo Palmer ^{[5]}	Liberal	Rosevears	2020–present
Hon Tania Rattray	Independent	McIntyre^{[1]}	2004–present
Hon Bastian Seidel ^{[5]}	Labor/Independent^{[7]}	Huon	2020–2022
Hon Jo Siejka ^{[2]}^{[8]}	Labor	Pembroke	2017–2022
Hon Rob Valentine ^{[3]}	Independent	Hobart	2012–2024
Hon Meg Webb ^{[4]}	Independent	Nelson	2019–present
Hon Jim Wilkinson	Independent	Nelson	1995–2019
Hon Josh Willie	Labor	Elwick	2016–2024

^{1} On 5 August 2017, new electoral boundaries came into effect which abolished the seats of Apsley and Western Tiers. The members for those divisions, Tania Rattray and Greg Hall, were both allocated the new seat of McIntyre until the expiry of Hall's term in April 2018.
^{2} Pembroke Liberal MLC Vanessa Goodwin resigned due to terminal cancer on 2 October 2017. Labor candidate Jo Siejka won the resulting by-election on 4 November.
^{3} Liberal candidate Jane Howlett won the new seat of Prosser at the 2018 Tasmanian Legislative Council periodic election, while incumbent independent Hobart MLC Rob Valentine was re-elected.
^{4} Independent candidate Meg Webb won the seat of Nelson at the 2019 Tasmanian Legislative Council periodic election, while Labor MLC Jo Siejka (Pembroke) and Liberal MLC Leonie Hiscutt (Montgomery) were re-elected.
^{5} At the 2020 Tasmanian Legislative Council periodic election, Liberal candidate Jo Palmer replaced retiring independent MLC Kerry Finch in Rosevears, while Labor candidate Bastian Seidel defeated incumbent independent MLC Robert Armstrong in Huon.
^{6} At the 2021 Tasmanian Legislative Council periodic election, Liberal candidate Nick Duigan replaced retiring independent MLC Ivan Dean in Windermere, while Labor candidate Craig Farrell (Derwent) was re-elected.
^{7} On 23 August 2021, Labor MLC Bastian Seidel resigned from the Labor caucus and resigned from the Legislative Council in January 2022. At the by-election held on 7 May 2022, Independent candidate Dean Harriss was elected.
^{8} On 2 August 2022, Labor MLC for Pembroke Jo Siejka resigned from the Legislative Council. At the by-election held on 10 September 2022, Labor candidate Luke Edmunds was elected.

== Sources ==
- Parliament of Tasmania (2006). The Parliament of Tasmania from 1856
