= Electoral results for the Division of Pembroke =

This is a list of electoral results for the electoral division of Pembroke in Tasmanian Legislative Council elections since 2005, when candidate political affiliations were first recorded in the official record.

== Members ==
Member	Party	Period
James Whyte	Independent	1856–1876
James Lord	Independent	1876–1881
William Hodgson	Independent	1881–1891
Henry Lamb	Independent	1891–1899
William Perkins	Independent	1899–1903
James Murdoch Sr.	Independent	1903–1925
James Murdoch Jr.	Independent	1925–1935
John Murdoch	Independent	1935–1936
Archibald Blacklow	Independent	1936–1953
William Dunbabin	Independent	1953–1959
Ben McKay	Independent	1959–1976
Peter McKay	Independent	1976–1991
Peter McKay	Liberal	1991–1999
Cathy Edwards	Independent	1999–2001
Allison Ritchie	Labor	2001–2009
Vanessa Goodwin	Liberal	2009–2017
Jo Siejka	Labor	2017–2022
Luke Edmunds	Labor	2022–present

== Election results ==
=== Elections in the 2020s ===
==== 2025 ====
2025 Tasmanian Legislative Council periodic elections: Pembroke
Party	Candidate	Votes	%	±%
Labor	Luke Edmunds	8,429	43.77	+4.29
Independent	Allison Ritchie	4,035	20.95	+20.95
Greens	Carly Allen	3,972	20.62	+1.35
Independent	Tony Mulder	2,004	10.41	+10.41
Shooters, Fishers, Farmers	Steve Loring	819	4.25	+1.09
Total formal votes		19,259	97.74	+0.80
Informal votes		446	2.26	−0.80
Turnout		19,705	84.07	+3.55
Two-party-preferred result
Labor	Luke Edmunds	11,181	58.18	−5.08
Independent	Allison Ritchie	8,036	41.82	+41.82
Labor hold				

Swings are calculated from the 2022 by-election.

==== 2022 ====
2022 Pembroke state by-election
Party	Candidate	Votes	%	±%
Labor	Luke Edmunds	7,176	39.48	−5.77
Liberal	Gregory Brown	5,234	28.79	+3.50
Greens	Deborah Brewer	3,502	19.27	+19.27
Independent	Hans Willink	1,692	9.31	+9.31
Shooters, Fishers, Farmers	Carlo Di Falco	574	3.16	−0.51
Total formal votes		18,178	96.94	+0.17
Informal votes		573	3.06	−0.17
Turnout		18,751	80.52	−5.11
Two-party-preferred result
Labor	Luke Edmunds	11,467	63.26	+4.61
Liberal	Gregory Brown	6,660	36.74	−4.61
Labor hold		Swing	+4.61	

=== Elections in the 2010s ===
==== 2019 ====
2019 Tasmanian Legislative Council periodic elections: Pembroke
Party	Candidate	Votes	%	±%
Labor	Jo Siejka	8,574	45.24	+12.84
Liberal	Kristy Johnson	4,793	25.29	−0.19
Independent	Tony Mulder	3,492	18.43	+18.43
Independent	Ron Cornish	1,396	7.37	+7.37
Shooters, Fishers, Farmers	Carlo Di Falco	696	3.67	+0.61
Total formal votes		18,951	96.77	+0.28
Informal votes		632	3.23	−0.28
Turnout		19,583	85.22	−0.16
Two-party-preferred result
Labor	Jo Siejka	11,038	58.65	+1.20
Liberal	Kristy Johnson	7,781	41.35	−1.20
Labor hold		Swing	+1.20	

Swings are calculated from the 2017 by-election.

==== 2017 ====
Tasmanian Legislative Council by-election, 2017: Pembroke
Party	Candidate	Votes	%	±%
Labor	Jo Siejka	6,846	32.2	+32.2
Liberal	James Walker	5,468	25.8	−25.3
Independent	Doug Chipman	4,212	19.9	+19.9
Greens	Bill Harvey	1,977	9.3	−1.0
Independent	Richard James	1,563	7.4	+7.4
Shooters, Fishers, Farmers	Carlo Di Falco	649	3.1	+3.1
Independent	Hans Willink	497	2.3	+2.3
Total formal votes		21,212	96.5	+0.1
Informal votes		772	3.5	−0.1
Turnout		21,984	84.3	−1.7
Two-party-preferred result
Labor	Jo Siejka	11,862	57.4	N/A
Liberal	James Walker	8,786	42.6	N/A
Labor gain from Liberal		Swing	N/A	

==== 2013 ====
Tasmanian Legislative Council periodic elections, 2013: Pembroke
Party	Candidate	Votes	%	±%
Liberal	Vanessa Goodwin	10,469	51.1	+12.6
Independent	Allison Ritchie	7,370	36.0	+36.0
Greens	Wendy Heatley	2,124	12.9	+0.1
Total formal votes		20,486	96.4	−0.1
Informal votes		774	3.6	+0.1
Turnout		21,260	86.0	+0.9
Liberal hold		Swing	N/A	

=== Elections in the 2000s ===
==== 2009 ====
Pembroke state by-election, 2009
Party	Candidate	Votes	%	±%
Liberal	Vanessa Goodwin	7,812	38.55	+38.55
Greens	Wendy Heatley	2,604	12.85	–0.56
Independent	Richard James	2,285	11.28	–7.10
Independent Labor	Honey Bacon	2,110	10.41	+10.41
Independent	John Peers	1,942	9.58	+0.32
Independent Labor	James Crotty	1,783	8.80	+8.80
Independent	Peter Cooper	1,510	7.45	+7.45
Independent	Kit (Sharon) Soo	219	1.08	+1.08
Total formal votes		20,265	96.48	–0.26
Informal votes		740	3.52	+0.26
Turnout		21,005	85.05	–2.47
After distribution of preferences
Liberal	Vanessa Goodwin	10,143	51.05	
Independent	Richard James	5,510	27.73	
Greens	Wendy Heatley	4,215	21.22	
Liberal gain from Labor		Swing	N/A	

==== 2007 ====
Tasmanian Legislative Council periodic elections, 2007: Pembroke
Party	Candidate	Votes	%	±%
Labor	Allison Ritchie	8,513	42.87	−14.22
Independent	Richard James	3,650	18.38	+18.38
Greens	Neil Smith	2,662	13.41	+13.41
Independent	Marti Zucco	2,332	11.74	+11.74
Independent	John Peers	1,839	9.26	+9.26
Independent	David Jackson	860	4.33	+4.33
Total formal votes		19,856	96.74	+0.09
Informal votes		669	3.26	−0.09
Turnout		20,525	87.52	−1.55
After distribution of preferences from three excluded candidates
Labor	Allison Ritchie	10,161	51.46	
Independent	Richard James	6,156	31.18	
Greens	Neil Smith	3,428	17.36	
Labor hold		Swing		
