= Women in the Tasmanian Legislative Council =

There have been 22 women in the Tasmanian Legislative Council since its establishment in 1825. Women have had the right to vote since 1903 and the right to stand as candidates since 1921.

The first successful female candidate for the Legislative Council was Margaret McIntyre, who was elected as the member for Cornwall in 1948. Like most MLCs, McIntyre was an independent. She died later in 1948 in an air accident, and the next woman elected to the Council was Labor's Lucy Grounds in 1951. Another Labor woman, Phyllis Benjamin, joined Grounds in 1952; Grounds retired in 1958 and Benjamin in 1976, in which year Kath Venn was elected to the Council. After Venn's departure in 1982 there were no women in the Council until 1992, when Jean Moore was elected. She departed in 1994, and since the election of Silvia Smith and Sue Smith to the Council in 1997 women have been represented continuously. In 2009, Vanessa Goodwin became the first Liberal woman elected to the Council.

== List of women in the Tasmanian Legislative Council ==
Names in bold indicate women who have been appointed as Ministers and Parliamentary Secretaries during their time in Parliament. Names in italics indicate entry into Parliament through a by-election or by appointment.

#	Name	Party	Electoral Division	Period of service
1	Margaret McIntyre	Independent	Cornwall	8 May 1948 – 2 September 1948 (died)
2	Lucy Grounds	Labor	Launceston	29 September 1951 – 10 May 1958 (defeated)
3	**Phyllis Benjamin**	Labor	Hobart	10 May 1952 – 22 May 1976 (retired)
4	Kath Venn	Labor	Hobart	22 May 1976 – 27 May 1982 (defeated)
5	Jean Moore	Independent	Hobart	11 April 1992 – 28 May 1994 (defeated)
6	Silvia Smith	Independent	Westmorland; Windermere	31 May 1997 – 3 May 2003 (defeated)
6	**Sue Smith**	Independent	Leven; Montgomery	31 May 1997 – 4 May 2013 (retired)
8	Cathy Edwards	Independent	Pembroke	28 August 1999 – 5 May 2001 (defeated)
8	**Lin Thorp**	Labor	Rumney	28 August 1999 – 7 May 2011 (defeated)
10	**Allison Ritchie**	Labor	Pembroke	5 May 2001 – 20 June 2009 (resigned)
11	Norma Jamieson	Independent	Mersey	3 May 2003 – 2 May 2009 (retired)
12	Tania Rattray	Independent	Apsley; McIntyre	1 May 2004 –
13	Ruth Forrest	Independent	Murchison	7 May 2005 –
14	**Vanessa Goodwin**	Liberal	Pembroke	12 August 2009 – 2 October 2017 (resigned)
15	Adriana Taylor	Independent	Elwick	1 May 2010 – 7 May 2016 (defeated)
16	Rosemary Armitage	Independent	Launceston	7 May 2011 –
17	Leonie Hiscutt	Liberal	Montgomery	4 May 2013 –
18	Sarah Lovell	Labor	Rumney	6 May 2017 –
19	Jo Siejka	Labor	Pembroke	4 November 2017 –
20	Jane Howlett	Liberal	Prosser	5 May 2018 –
21	Meg Webb	Independent	Nelson	4 May 2019 –
22	Jo Palmer	Liberal	Rosevears	1 August 2020 –
