= Parliament of Tasmania =

Australian state legislature

Coordinates: 42°53′07″S 147°19′49″E

- 52nd Parliament
- Coat of arms of Tasmania

- Tasmanian Parliament logo

Type
- Type: Bicameral
- Houses: Legislative Council; House of Assembly
- Sovereign: Governor of Tasmania (Note: Unlike most of the other states, the governor of Tasmania is explicitly listed as a constituent part of Parliament, instead of merely acting in the King’s name.)

History
- Founded: 2 December 1856; 169 years ago

Leadership
- Governor: Caroline Wells since 17 June 2026
- President of the Legislative Council: Craig Farrell, Labor since 21 May 2019
- Speaker: Jacquie Petrusma, Liberal since 19 August 2025
- Premier: Jeremy Rockliff, Liberal since 8 April 2022
- Leader of the Opposition: Josh Willie, Labor since 20 August 2025

Structure
- Seats: 50 MPs; 35 MHAs; 15 MLCs
- House of Assembly political groups: Government (14): Liberal (14); Opposition (10): Labor (10); Crossbench (11): Greens (4); Independent (6); Shooters, Fishers and Farmers (1)
- Legislative Council political groups: Government (4): Liberal (3) (Note: Nick Duigan (Windermere), Kerry Vincent (Prosser), Jo Palmer (Rosevears)); Independent (1); Opposition (3): Labor (3) (Note: Craig Farrell (Derwent), Luke Edmunds (Pembroke), Sarah Lovell (Rumney)); Crossbench (8): Greens (1); Independent (7) (Note: Rosemary Armitage (Launceston), Ruth Forrest (Murchison), Mike Gaffney (Mersey), Dean Harriss (Huon), Casey Hiscutt (Montgomery), Bec Thomas (Elwick), Meg Webb (Nelson))

Elections
- House of Assembly voting system: Proportional representation via Hare-Clark system (STV)
- Legislative Council voting system: Partial Preferential (IRV)
- Last House of Assembly election: 19 July 2025
- Last Legislative Council election: 2 May 2026 (periodic)
- Next House of Assembly election: By 2029
- Next Legislative Council election: 2027

Meeting place
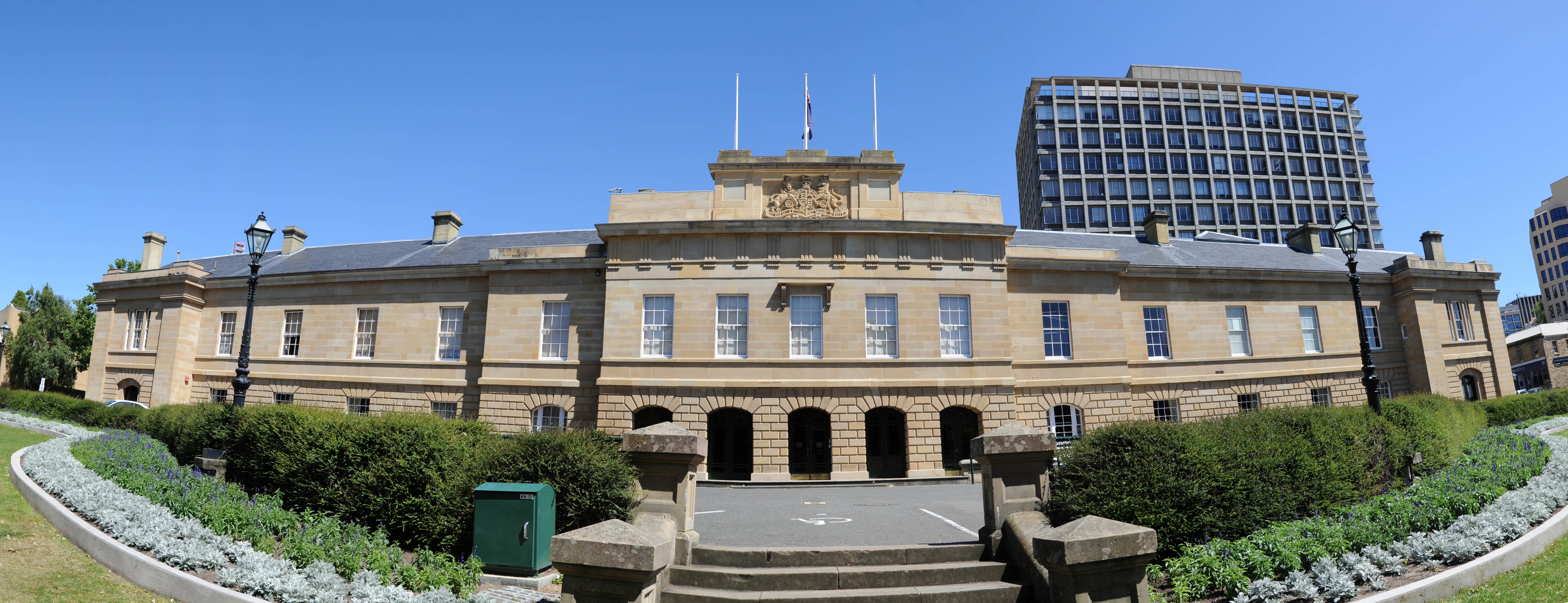
- Parliament House, Hobart, Tasmania, Australia

Website
- parliament.tas.gov.au

The Parliament of Tasmania is the bicameral legislature of the Australian state of Tasmania. It follows a Westminster-derived parliamentary system and consists of the governor of Tasmania (the representative of the King), the Legislative Council (the upper house), and the House of Assembly (the lower house). Since 1841, the Legislative Council has met in Parliament House, Hobart, with the House of Assembly following suit from its establishment in 1856. The Parliament of Tasmania first met in 1856.

The powers of the Parliament are prescribed in the Constitution of Tasmania. Since the Federation of Australia in 1901, Tasmania has been a state of the Commonwealth of Australia, and the Constitution of Australia regulates its relationship with the Commonwealth. Under the Australian Constitution, Tasmania ceded certain legislative and judicial powers to the Commonwealth, but retained complete independence in all other areas.

The leader of the party or coalition with the confidence of the House of Assembly is invited by the governor to form the Government and become the premier of Tasmania.

Throughout its history, the Tasmanian Parliament frequently had members who previously served in Federal Parliament proportionally more so than the other state and territory parliaments.

The Government currently consists of a Liberal minority government, formed after the 2025 state election. The Third Rockliff ministry consists of Liberal members.

== History ==
The island of Van Diemen's Land (now known as Tasmania) was claimed and subsequently settled by the United Kingdom in 1803. Initially, it was administered by the governor of New South Wales, as part of that British Colony of New South Wales. In 1825, Van Diemen's Land became a separate British colony, administered separately from New South Wales, with a Legislative Council of six men appointed to advise the lieutenant governor of Van Diemen's Land who had sole governance of the colony. The Council initially held meetings in a room adjacent to the old Government House that was located near to the present site of Franklin Square, but by 1841 they relocated meetings to the 'Long Room' (now the Members' Lounge) in the Customs House.

In 1850, the British Parliament enacted the Australian Constitutions Act 1850 (13 & 14 Vict. c. 59 (Imp)), which gave Van Diemen's Land the right to elect its first representative government. The size of the Legislative Council was increased from six to 24. Eight members were appointed by the Governor, and 16 were elected by property owners. The new Legislative Council met for the first time in 1852, and by 1854 they had passed the Tasmanian Constitution Act, giving Van Diemen's Land responsible self-government and a new bicameral parliament. Queen Victoria granted Royal assent in 1855 and Van Diemen's Land became a self-governing colony. In the following year, 1856, one of the new parliament's first acts was to change the name of the colony from Van Diemen's Land to Tasmania.

== Houses of Parliament ==
=== House of Assembly ===
The Tasmanian House of Assembly is the lower house of the Tasmanian Parliament. There are 35 members, with seven members elected from the five divisions. The divisions are: Bass, Braddon, Clark, Franklin, and Lyons. The Tasmanian House of Assembly electoral divisions share the same names and boundaries as the Australian House of Representatives divisions for Tasmania.

Members are elected using the Hare-Clark voting system of multi-member proportional representation for a term of up to 4 years. (Note: Since 1976; prior to 1976, the maximum term of the Assembly was five years.)

==== Current distribution of seats ====
The distribution of seats is currently:

| Party | Seats held | Percentage | Seat distribution |
|---|---|---|---|
| Liberal | 14 | 40.0% | |
| Labor | 10 | 28.6% | |
| Independent | 6 | 17.1% | |
| Greens | 4 | 11.4% | |
| Shooters, Fishers and Farmers | 1 | 2.9% | |

| Electorate | Seats won |
|---|---|
| Bass | |
| Braddon | |
| Clark | |
| Franklin | |
| Lyons | |

| Liberal |
| Labor |
| Greens |
| Independent |
| Shooters, Fishers and Farmers |

=== Legislative Council ===
The Tasmanian Legislative Council is the upper house of the Tasmanian Parliament. It has 15 members, each elected from a single-member electoral division. The boundaries of the divisions are reviewed by tribunal every 9 years.

Elections are conducted annually on a 6-year periodic cycle; 3 divisions will be up for election in May one year, then 2 divisions in May the following year and so on. As such, each member will normally serve a term of 6 years.

==== Current distribution of seats ====
The current distribution of seats (updated post 2025 Tasmanian Legislative Council periodic elections) is:

| Party | Seats held | Percentage | Seat distribution |
|---|---|---|---|
| Independents | 8 | 53.3% | |
| Liberal Party | 3 | 20.0% | |
| Labor Party | 3 | 20.0% | |
| Greens | 1 | 6.7% | |

| Electorate | Seats won |
|---|---|
| Derwent | |
| Elwick | |
| Hobart | |
| Huon | |
| Launceston | |
| McIntyre | |
| Mersey | |
| Montgomery | |
| Murchison | |
| Nelson | |
| Pembroke | |
| Prosser | |
| Rosevears | |
| Rumney | |
| Windermere | |

| Independent |
| Liberal |
| Labor |
| Greens |

== Longest-serving members ==
Members of the Tasmanian upper and lower houses with over 30 years of service.

| Name | Party | Chamber | Start of tenure | End of tenure | Period of service |
|---|---|---|---|---|---|
| Michael Polley | Labor | House of Assembly | 22 April 1972 | 15 March 2014 | 41 years, 327 days |
| Sir John Evans | Commonwealth Liberal | House of Assembly | 20 January 1897 | 20 February 1937 | 40 years, 31 days |
| William Dodery | Independent | House of Assembly | 4 June 1861 | 30 June 1870 | 39 years, 94 days |
| William Dodery | Independent | Legislative Council | 7 March 1877 | 7 May 1907 | 39 years, 94 days |
| Neil Campbell | Liberal League | House of Assembly | 10 June 1922 | 19 February 1955 | 37 years, 236 days |
| Neil Campbell | Liberal League | Legislative Council | 14 May 1955 | 25 April 1960 | 37 years, 236 days |
| Sir Walter Lee | Liberal League | House of Assembly | 30 April 1909 | 23 November 1946 | 37 years, 207 days |
| William Moore | Independent | House of Assembly | 14 September 1871 | 1 August 1877 | 37 years, 198 days |
| William Moore | Independent | Legislative Council | 13 September 1877 | 4 May 1909 | 37 years, 198 days |
| Dr Edward Crowther | Free Trade | House of Assembly | 26 November 1878 | 30 April 1912 | 33 years, 156 days |
| Sir Robert Cosgrove | Labor | House of Assembly | 31 May 1919 | 10 June 1922 | 33 years, 70 days |
| Sir Robert Cosgrove | Labor | House of Assembly | 30 June 1925 | 9 May 1931 | 33 years, 70 days |
| Sir Robert Cosgrove | Labor | House of Assembly | 9 June 1934 | 25 August 1958 | 33 years, 70 days |
| Frederick Grubb | Independent | Legislative Council | 6 March 1879 | 1 November 1880 | 31 years, 325 days |
| Frederick Grubb | Independent | Legislative Council | 12 February 1881 | 1 May 1911 | 31 years, 325 days |
| John Madden | Labor | House of Assembly | 20 June 1936 | 13 October 1956 | 31 years, 255 days |
| John Madden | Labor | House of Assembly | 23 December 1957 | 10 May 1969 | 31 years, 255 days |
| Bill Neilson | Labor | House of Assembly | 23 November 1946 | 1 December 1977 | 31 years, 8 days |
| John Dwyer VC | Labor | House of Assembly | 9 May 1931 | 17 January 1962 | 30 years, 253 days |
| Sir Alexander Lillico | Independent | Legislative Council | 6 May 1924 | 8 May 1954 | 30 years, 2 days |

== See also ==
- Parliaments of the Australian states and territories
- Official Openings by the Monarch in Australia
