= Members of the Tasmanian Legislative Council, 2006–2010 =

This is a list of members of the Tasmanian Legislative Council from 2006 to 2010. Terms of the Legislative Council do not coincide with Legislative Assembly elections, with members serving six-year terms, and two or three members facing re-election every year. The members have been categorised here according to the four-year terms of the Legislative Assembly so as to avoid the need for separate member lists for each year.

Name	Party	Electorate	Term
Hon Michael Aird ^{5}	Labor Party	Derwent	1995–2011
Hon Ivan Dean ^{5}	Independent	Windermere	2003–2021
Hon Kerry Finch ^{4}	Independent	Rosevears	2002–2020
Hon Ruth Forrest	Independent	Murchison	2005–present
Hon Mike Gaffney ^{5}	Independent	Mersey	2009–present
Hon Vanessa Goodwin ^{6}	Liberal Party	Pembroke	2009–2017
Hon Greg Hall ^{1}	Independent	Rowallan	2001–2018
Hon Paul Harriss ^{4}	Independent	Huon	1996–2014
Hon Norma Jamieson ^{5}	Independent	Mersey	2003–2009
Hon Terry Martin	ALP/Independent ^{2}	Elwick	2004–2010
Hon Doug Parkinson ^{1}	Australian Labor Party	Wellington	1994–2012
Hon Tania Rattray	Independent	Apsley	2004–present
Hon Allison Ritchie ^{3} ^{6}	Australian Labor Party	Pembroke	2001–2009
Hon Sue Smith ^{3}	Independent	Montgomery	1997–2013
Hon Lin Thorp	Australian Labor Party	Rumney	1999–2011
Hon Jim Wilkinson ^{3}	Independent	Nelson	1995–2019
Hon Don Wing	Independent	Paterson	1982–2011

^{1} Rowallan MLC Greg Hall and Wellington MLC Doug Parkinson faced re-election at the 2006 periodic elections. Both were returned.
^{2} Elwick MLC Terry Martin was elected as an ALP member, but was expelled from the parliamentary Labor party on 29 March 2007, after voting against government legislation to fast-track planning approval for the proposed Bell Bay Pulp Mill. He has stated his intention to serve out the remainder of his term as an independent.
^{3} Montgomery MLC Sue Smith, Nelson MLC Jim Wilkinson and Pembroke MLC Allison Ritchie faced re-election at the 2007 periodic elections. All three were returned.
^{4} Huon MLC Paul Harriss and Rosevears MLC Kerry Finch faced re-election at the 2008 periodic elections. Both were returned.
^{5} Derwent MLC Michael Aird and Windermere MLC Ivan Dean faced re-election at the 2009 periodic elections. Both were returned. Mersey MLC Norma Jamieson retired, and the election for her seat was won by Mike Gaffney.
^{6} Pembroke MLC Allison Ritchie resigned on 20 June 2009. The ensuing by-election was won by Vanessa Goodwin.
