= 2019 Tasmanian Legislative Council periodic election =

Legislative election in Tasmania, Australia

- 4 May 2019

3 of the 15 seats in the Legislative Council 8 seats needed for a majority
	First party	Second party	Third party
Party	Independent	Liberal	Labor
Seats before	1	1	1
Seats won	1	1	1
Seat change	Steady	Steady	Steady

Periodic elections for the Tasmanian Legislative Council were held on 4 May 2019. The three seats up for election were Montgomery, Nelson and Pembroke. Montgomery and Nelson were previously contested in 2013. Pembroke was won by the Labor Party in a 2017 by-election, following the resignation of the sitting member, Vanessa Goodwin of the Liberal Party.

== Montgomery ==
Location of Montgomery in Tasmania

Montgomery had been held by Leonie Hiscutt of the Liberal Party since the 2013 election.

=== Montgomery Results ===
2019 Tasmanian Legislative Council periodic elections: Montgomery
Party	Candidate	Votes	%	±%
Liberal	Leonie Hiscutt	10,047	44.39	−1.52
Labor	Michelle Rippon	5,722	25.28	+25.28
Independent	Cheryl Fuller	4,416	19.51	−10.40
Shooters, Fishers, Farmers	Brenton Jones	2,446	10.81	+10.81
Total formal votes		22,631	96.22	+1.51
Informal votes		889	3.78	−1.51
Turnout		23,520	84.26	−2.54
Two-party-preferred result
Liberal	Leonie Hiscutt	13,617	60.17	N/A
Labor	Michelle Rippon	9,014	39.83	N/A
Liberal hold		Swing	N/A	

== Nelson ==
Location of Nelson in Tasmania

Nelson had been held by independent Jim Wilkinson since 1999. Wilkinson retired at this election.

=== Nelson Results ===
2019 Tasmanian Legislative Council periodic elections: Nelson
Party	Candidate	Votes	%	±%
Liberal	Nic Street	4,567	23.69	+23.69
Independent	Vica Bayley	3,069	15.92	+15.92
Independent	Meg Webb	2,662	13.81	+13.81
Independent	Madeleine Ogilvie	2,420	12.55	+12.55
Greens	Deborah Brewer	2,147	11.14	−14.36
Independent	Blair Brownless	1,223	6.34	+6.34
Independent	John (Polly) Farmer	1,168	6.06	+6.06
Independent	Richard Griggs	960	4.98	+4.98
Independent	Robert Manning	669	3.47	+3.47
Shooters, Fishers, Farmers	Lorraine Bennett	394	2.04	+2.04
Total formal votes		19,279	97.24	+0.79
Informal votes		547	2.76	−0.79
Turnout		19,826	82.31	+0.44
Two-candidate-preferred result
Independent	Meg Webb	10,648	59.26	N/A
Liberal	Nic Street	7,320	40.74	N/A
Independent win				

== Pembroke ==
Location of Pembroke in Tasmania

Pembroke had been held by Jo Siejka of the Labor Party since a 2017 by-election.

=== Pembroke Results ===
2019 Tasmanian Legislative Council periodic elections: Pembroke
Party	Candidate	Votes	%	±%
Labor	Jo Siejka	8,574	45.24	+12.84
Liberal	Kristy Johnson	4,793	25.29	−0.19
Independent	Tony Mulder	3,492	18.43	+18.43
Independent	Ron Cornish	1,396	7.37	+7.37
Shooters, Fishers, Farmers	Carlo Di Falco	696	3.67	+0.61
Total formal votes		18,951	96.77	+0.28
Informal votes		632	3.23	−0.28
Turnout		19,583	85.22	−0.16
Two-party-preferred result
Labor	Jo Siejka	11,038	58.65	+1.20
Liberal	Kristy Johnson	7,781	41.35	−1.20
Labor hold		Swing	+1.20	

Swings are calculated from the 2017 by-election.
