= Members of the Tasmanian Legislative Council, 1999–2005 =

This is a list of members of the Tasmanian Legislative Council between 1999 and 2005. Terms of the Legislative Council did not coincide with Legislative Assembly elections, and members served six year terms, with a number of members facing election each year.

A major redistribution prior to the 1999 periodic election reduced the Council from 19 to 15 seats.

== Elections ==
Date	Electorates
28 August 1999	Murchison; Rumney
6 May 2000	Paterson; Wellington
5 May 2001	Nelson; Pembroke; Rowallan
4 May 2002	Huon; Montgomery; Rosevears
3 May 2003	Derwent; Mersey; Windermere
1 May 2004	Apsley; Elwick

== Members ==
Name	Party	Division	Years in office	Elected
Hon Michael Aird	Labor	Derwent	1995–2011	2003
Hon Ray Bailey		Rosevears	1990–2002	1996
Hon Dr David Crean	Labor	Elwick	1992–2004	1998
Hon Ivan Dean		Windermere	2003–2021	2003
Hon Cathy Edwards		Pembroke	1999–2001	b/e
Hon Kerry Finch		Rosevears	2002–2020	2002
Hon Tony Fletcher		Murchison	1981–2005	1999
Hon Greg Hall		Rowallan	2001–2018	2001
Hon Paul Harriss		Huon	1996–2014	2002
Hon Norma Jamieson		Mersey	2003–2009	2003
Hon John Loone		Rowallan	1989–2001	1995
Hon Terry Martin	Labor	Elwick	2004–2010	2004
Hon Doug Parkinson	Labor	Wellington	1994–2012	2000
Hon Colin Rattray		Apsley	1992–2004	1998
Hon Tania Rattray		Apsley	2004–present	2004
Hon Allison Ritchie	Labor	Pembroke	2001–2009	2001
Hon Silvia Smith	Ind. Labor	Windermere	1997–2003	1997
Hon Sue Smith		Montgomery	1997–2013	2002
Hon Geoff Squibb		Mersey	1990–2003	1997
Hon Lin Thorp	Labor	Rumney	1999–2011	1999
Hon Jim Wilkinson		Nelson	1995–2019	2001
Hon Don Wing		Paterson	1982–2011	2000

== Sources ==
- Parliament of Tasmania (2006). The Parliament of Tasmania from 1856
