= Members of the Tasmanian Legislative Council, 2005–2011 =

This is a list of members of the Tasmanian Legislative Council between 2005 and 2011. Terms of the Legislative Council did not coincide with Legislative Assembly elections, and members served six year terms, with a number of members facing election each year.

A redistribution in 2007–2008 saw three of the electorates renamed.

== Elections ==
Date	Electorates
7 May 2005	Murchison; Paterson (Launceston); Rumney
6 May 2006	Rowallan (Western Tiers); Wellington (Hobart)
5 May 2007	Montgomery; Nelson; Pembroke
3 May 2008	Huon; Rosevears
2 May 2009	Derwent; Mersey; Windermere
1 May 2010	Apsley; Elwick

== Members ==
Name	Party	Division	Years in office	Elected
Hon Michael Aird	Labor	Derwent	1995–2011	2009
Hon Ivan Dean		Windermere	2003–2021	2009
Hon Kerry Finch		Rosevears	2002–2020	2008
Hon Ruth Forrest		Murchison	2005–present	2011
Hon Mike Gaffney		Mersey	2009–present	2009
Hon Dr Vanessa Goodwin^{[2]}	Liberal	Pembroke	2009–2017	b/e
Hon Greg Hall		Rowallan/Western Tiers	2001–2018	2006
Hon Paul Harriss		Huon	1996–2014	2008
Hon Terry Martin	Labor/Independent	Elwick	2004–2010	2004
Hon Doug Parkinson	Labor	Wellington/Hobart	1994–2012	2006
Hon Tania Rattray		Apsley	2004–present	2010
Hon Allison Ritchie^{[2]}	Labor	Pembroke	2001–2009	2007
Hon Sue Smith		Montgomery	1997–2013	2007
Hon Adriana Taylor		Elwick	2010–2016	2010
Hon Lin Thorp	Labor	Rumney	1999–2011	2005
Hon Jim Wilkinson		Nelson	1995–2019	2007
Hon Don Wing		Paterson/Launceston	1982–2011	2005

== Notes ==
^{1} On 29 March 2007, the Labor member for Elwick, Terry Martin, was expelled from the parliamentary Labor party after voting against government legislation to fast-track planning approval for the proposed Bell Bay Pulp Mill. He has stated his intention to serve out the remainder of his term as an independent.
^{2} In June 2009, Allison Ritchie, the Labor member for Pembroke, resigned. Liberal candidate Vanessa Goodwin won the resulting by-election on 1 August 2009.

== Sources ==
- Parliament of Tasmania (2006). The Parliament of Tasmania from 1856
