= 2025 Tasmanian Legislative Council periodic election =

Legislative election in Tasmania, Australia

- 24 May 2025

3 of the 15 seats in the Tasmanian Legislative Council 8 seats needed for a majority

| | First party | Second party | Third party |
|---|---|---|---|
| | IND |
| Party | Independents | Liberal | Labor |
| Seats before | 7 seats | 4 seats | 3 seats |
| Seats won | 2 | 0 | 1 |
| Seats after | 8 | 3 | 3 |
| Seat change | ▲1 | ▼1 | Steady |
Largest party before election
Independents
Largest party after election
Independents

The 2025 Tasmanian Legislative Council periodic election was held on 24 May 2025 to elect three members of the Tasmanian Legislative Council. The seats of Montgomery, Nelson and Pembroke were up for election. The Liberal Party's loss to an independent candidate in Montgomery means independents now hold the majority in the historically non-partisan chamber.

The elections were initially scheduled to be held on 3 May 2025. However, they were postponed on 25 March 2025 following consultation with the Tasmanian Electoral Commission (TEC) to prevent a possible clash with the 2025 federal election, which was called three days later.

== Background ==
Unlike other Australian state parliaments, the Tasmanian House of Assembly is elected from multi-member districts, while the Legislative Council is elected from single-member districts. The reverse is the case in most of the rest of Australia; that is, the lower house is elected from single-member districts while the upper house is elected from multi-member districts.

The Legislative Council has 15 seats, with members elected to a six-year term. Elections are staggered, alternating between three seats in one year and in two seats the next year, taking place on the first Saturday in May.

Tasmanian's upper house is unique in Australian politics, in that historically it is the only chamber in any state parliament to be significantly non-partisan. Prior to the election, the chamber had a plurality of independents, although it had previously had an outright independent majority.

== Electoral system ==
Legislative Council elections use partial preferential voting and the Robson Rotation. In elections with four or less candidates, full preferential voting is effectively used, but for seats with five or more candidates, voters only have to number at least three boxes.

- Where there are more than 3 candidates, at least number 1, 2 and 3
- Where there are 3 candidates, at least number 1 and 2
- Where there are 2 candidates, at least number 1

== Montgomery ==
2025 Tasmanian Legislative Council periodic election (Montgomery)
- 24 May 2025

Electoral division of Montgomery in the Tasmanian Legislative Council
- Registered: 29,824
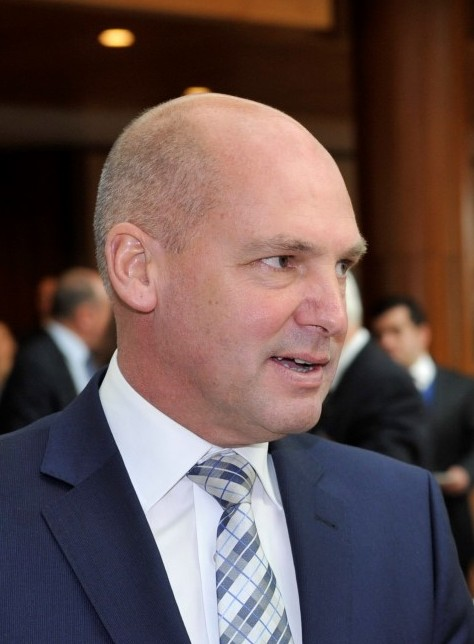

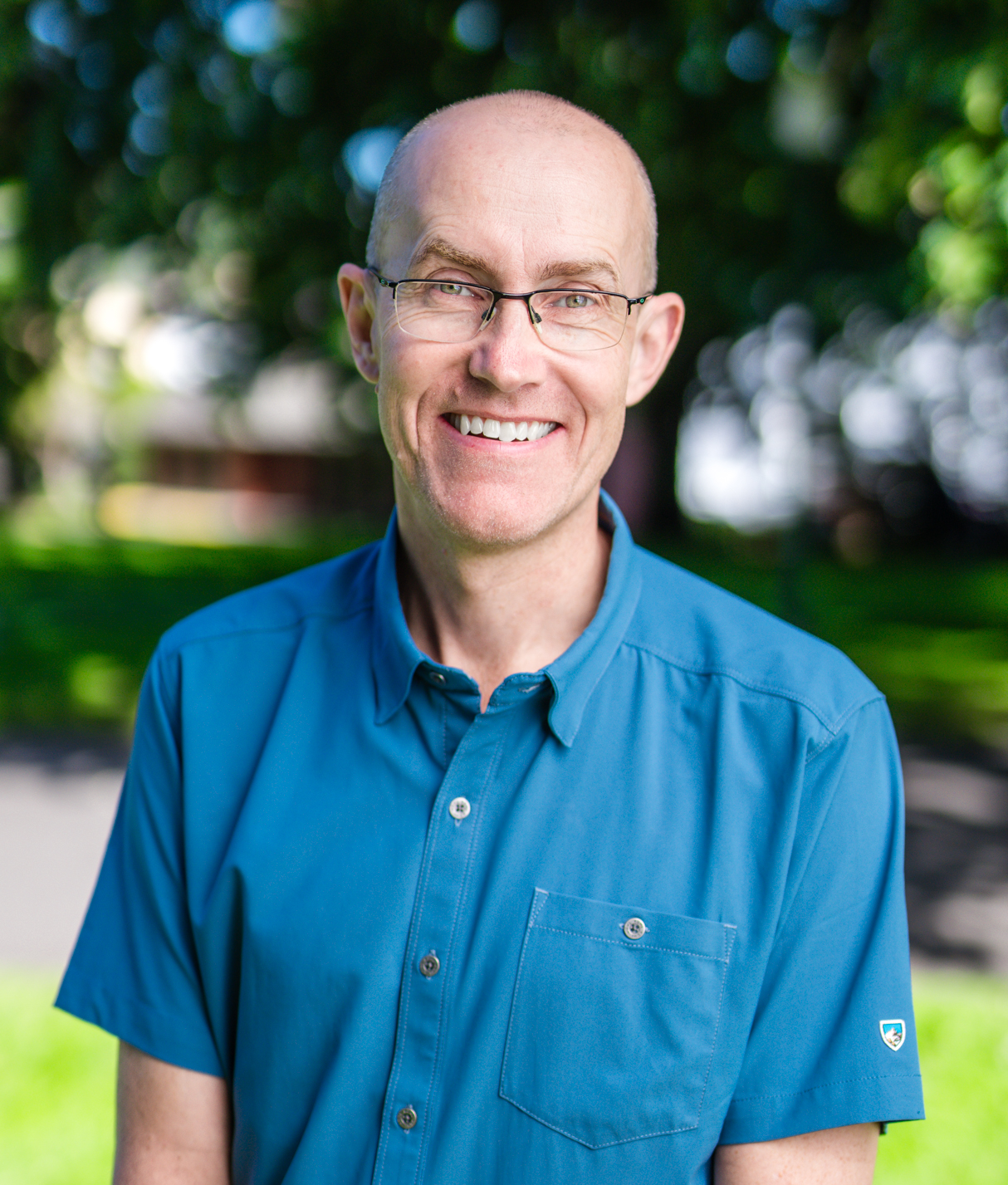
| | First party | Second party |
|---|---|---|
| | IND |
| Candidate | Casey Hiscutt | Stephen Parry |
| Party | Independent | Liberal |
| Primary vote | 7,564 | 6,911 |
| Percentage | 32.0 | 29.2 |
| Swing | ▲32.0 | ▼15.2 |
| TCP | 61.7% | 38.3% |
| TCP swing | ▲61.7 | ▼21.9 |
| | Third party | Fourth party |
| | | SFF |
| Candidate | Darren Briggs | Adrian Pickin |
| Party | Greens | Shooters |
| Primary vote | 5,111 | 3,048 |
| Percentage | 21.6 | 12.9 |
| Swing | ▲21.6 | ▲2.1 |
MLC before election
Leonie Hiscutt
Liberal
Elected MLC
Casey Hiscutt
Independent

Montgomery is located on Tasmania's north-west coast, covering the Central Coast Council and the south-eastern suburbs of Burnie. The seat has been held by Liberal Party member Leonie Hiscutt since 2013, when she succeeded retiring independent incumbent Sue Smith, and she was re-elected in 2019 with 60.17% of the two-party-preferred vote.

On 16 May 2024, Hiscutt announced that she would not seek re-election in 2025. Her son, Central Coast councillor Casey Hiscutt, announced on the same day that he would contest Montgomery as an independent with her endorsement. Former senator Stephen Parry, who served as the President of the Senate from 2014 until 2017, was announced on 15 June 2024 as the Liberal candidate.

=== Candidates ===
| Party | Candidate | Background |
|---|---|---|
| Liberal | Stephen Parry | Former senator for Tasmania |
| Independent | Casey Hiscutt | Central Coast councillor |
| Tasmanians Now | Gatty Burnett | Student & candidate for Murchison in 2023 |
| Greens | Darren Briggs | Doctor & candidate for Braddon in 2021 and 2024 |
| Shooters, Fishers, Farmers | Adrian Pickin | Ranger & former businessman |

=== Montgomery results ===
2025 Tasmanian Legislative Council periodic election: Montgomery
| Party | Candidate | Votes | % | ±% |
|---|---|---|---|---|
| Independent | Casey Hiscutt | 7,564 | 31.99 | +31.99 |
| Liberal | Stephen Parry | 6,911 | 29.23 | −15.16 |
| Greens | Darren Briggs | 5,111 | 21.62 | +21.62 |
| Shooters, Fishers, Farmers | Adrian Pickin | 3,048 | 12.89 | +2.08 |
| Independent | Gatty Burnett | 1,008 | 4.26 | +4.26 |
| Total formal votes | | 23,642 | 96.31 | +0.09 |
| Informal votes | | 906 | 3.69 | −0.09 |
| Turnout | | 24,548 | 82.31 | −1.95 |
Two-candidate-preferred result
| Independent | Casey Hiscutt | 14,487 | 61.72 | +61.72 |
| Liberal | Stephen Parry | 8,986 | 38.28 | −21.89 |
| Independent gain from Liberal | | | | |

== Nelson ==
2025 Tasmanian Legislative Council periodic election (Nelson)
- 24 May 2025

Electoral division of Nelson in the Tasmanian Legislative Council
- Registered: 25,560

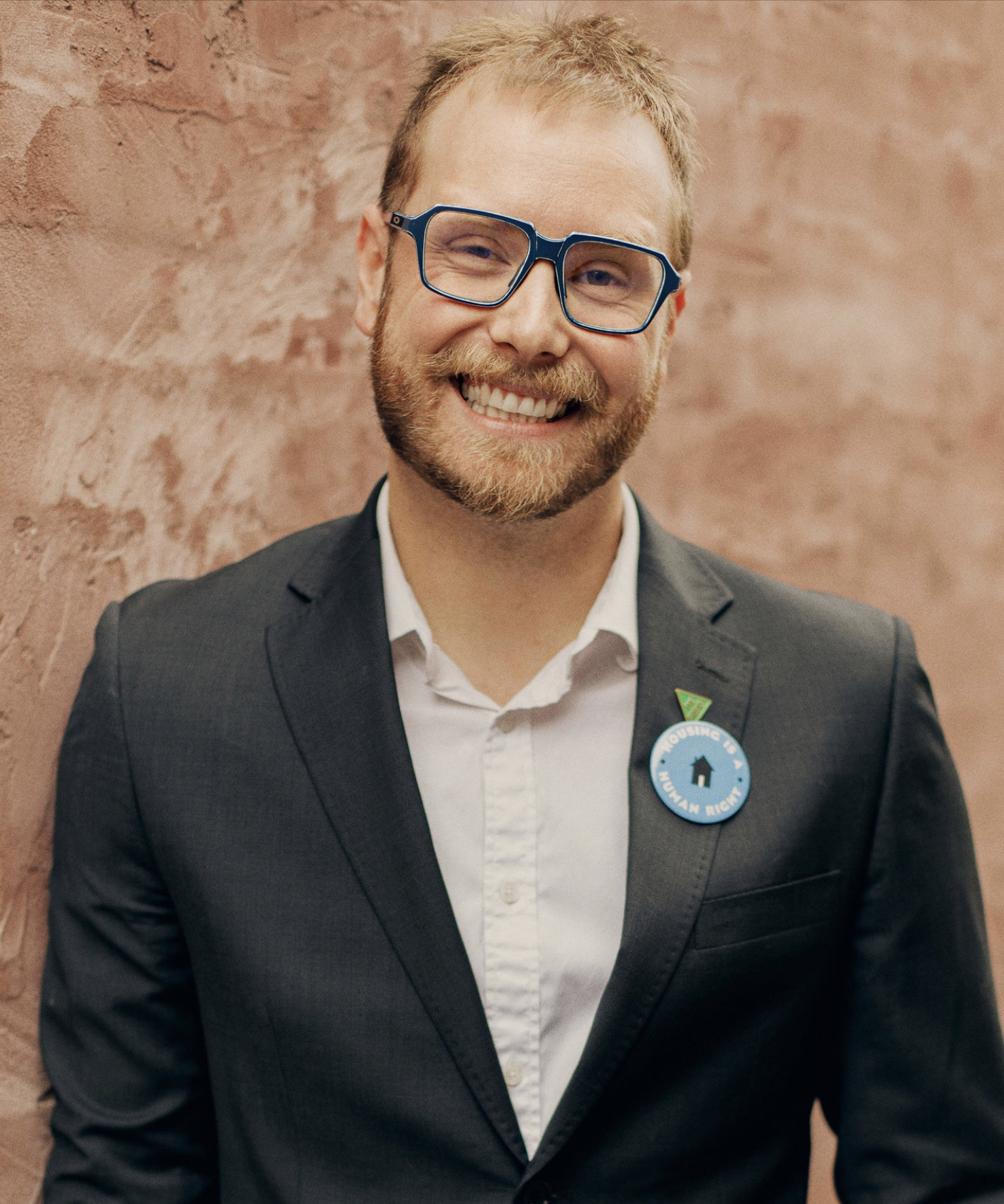
| | First party | Second party | Third party |
|---|---|---|---|
| | IND |
| Candidate | Meg Webb | Marcus Vermey | Nathan Volf |
| Party | Independent | Liberal | Greens |
| Primary vote | 10,650 | 7,045 | 2,896 |
| Percentage | 51.7 | 34.2 | 14.1 |
| Swing | ▲37.9 | ▲10.5 | ▲2.9 |
MLC before election
Meg Webb
Independent
Elected MLC
Meg Webb
Independent

Nelson is located in the Tasmanian capital of Hobart and includes parts of the Hobart and Kingborough municipal areas. The seat has been held by independent member Meg Webb since 2019, when she succeeded retiring independent incumbent Jim Wilkinson.

Webb announced in 2024 that she would seek re-election. On 23 June 2024, the Liberal Party announced that butcher Marcus Vermey would be its candidate.

=== Candidates ===
| Party | Candidate | Background |
|---|---|---|
| Independent | Meg Webb | MLC for Nelson since 2019 |
| Liberal | Marcus Vermey | Butcher and candidate for Clark at 2024 state election |
| Greens | Nathan Volf | Candidate for Clark in 2021 and 2024 |

=== Nelson results ===
2025 Tasmanian Legislative Council periodic election: Nelson
| Party | Candidate | Votes | % | ±% |
|---|---|---|---|---|
| Independent | Meg Webb | 10,650 | 51.72 | +37.91 |
| Liberal | Marcus Vermey | 7,045 | 34.21 | +10.52 |
| Greens | Nathan Volf | 2,896 | 14.06 | +2.92 |
| Total formal votes | | 20,591 | 98.12 | +0.88 |
| Informal votes | | 394 | 1.88 | −0.88 |
| Turnout | | 20,985 | 82.10 | −0.21 |
| Independent hold | | | | |

== Pembroke ==
2025 Tasmanian Legislative Council periodic election (Pembroke)
- 24 May 2025

Electoral division of Pembroke in the Tasmanian Legislative Council
- Registered: 23,438

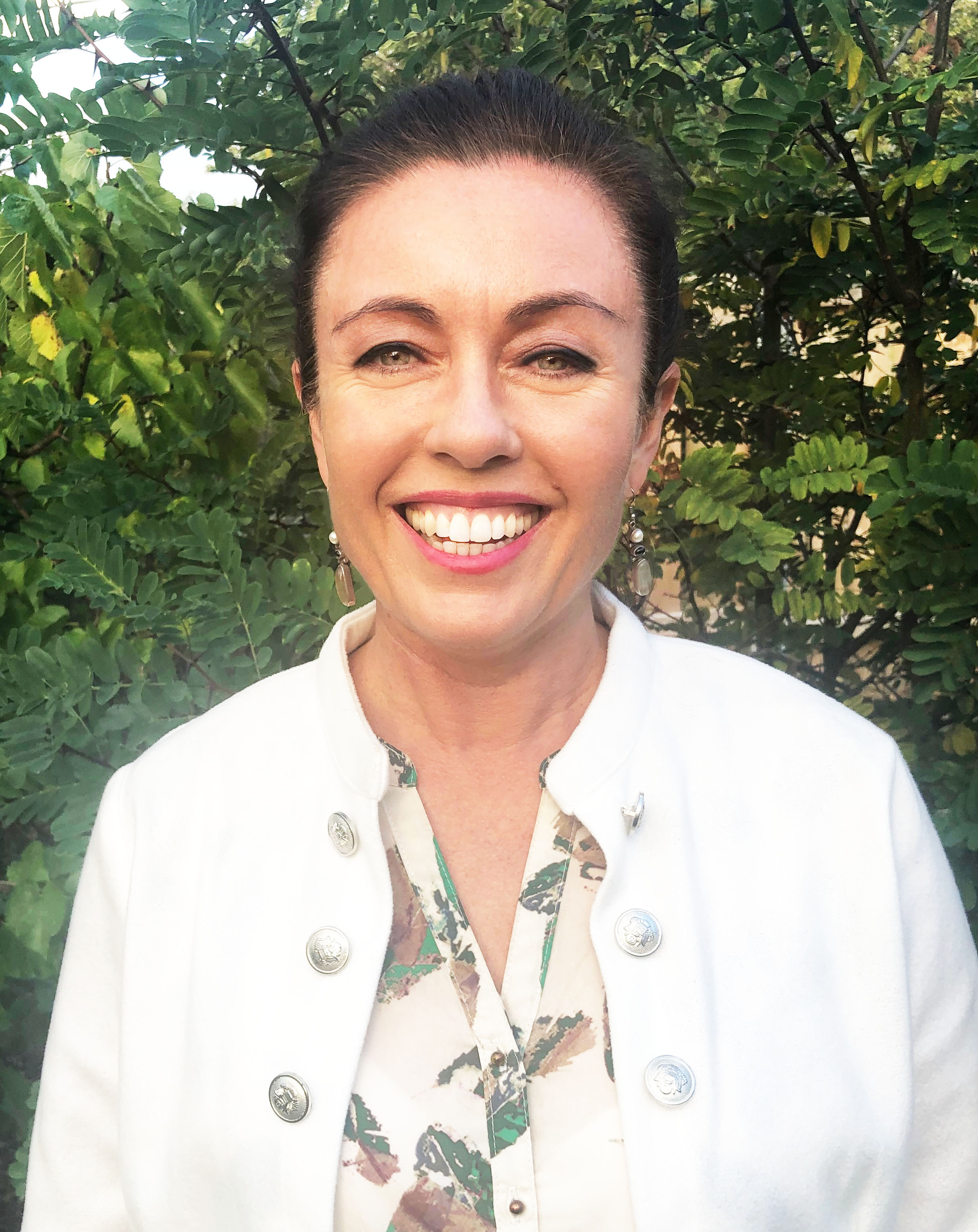
| | First party | Second party |
|---|---|---|
| | | IND |
| Candidate | Luke Edmunds | Allison Ritchie |
| Party | Labor | Independent |
| Primary vote | 8,449 | 4,049 |
| Percentage | 43.7 | 21.0 |
| Swing | ▲4.3 | ▲21.0 |
| TCP | 58.2% | 41.8% |
| TCP swing | ▼5.1 | ▲41.8 |
| | Third party | Fourth party |
| | | IND |
| Candidate | Carly Allen | Tony Mulder |
| Party | Greens | Independent |
| Primary vote | 3,995 | 2,009 |
| Percentage | 20.7 | 10.4 |
| Swing | ▲1.4 | ▲10.4 |
MLC before election
Luke Edmunds
Labor
Elected MLC
Luke Edmunds
Labor

Pembroke is located in Hobart and covers the Clarence municipal area. The seat has been held by Labor Party member Luke Edmunds since a by-election in 2022, which he won with 63.26% of the two-party-preferred vote.

On 2 November 2024, Edmunds was re-endorsed by Labor for the 2025 election. Former Labor MLC Allison Ritchie announced her candidacy as an independent in March 2025.

=== Candidates ===
| Party | Candidate | Background |
|---|---|---|
| Labor | Luke Edmunds | MLC for Pembroke since 2022 |
| Independent | Allison Ritchie | Deputy mayor of Clarence and former MLC for Pembroke |
| Greens | Carly Allen | Small business owner |
| Independent | Tony Mulder | Former MLC for Rumney |
| Shooters, Fishers, Farmers | Steve Loring | |

=== Pembroke results ===
2025 Tasmanian Legislative Council periodic election: Pembroke
| Party | Candidate | Votes | % | ±% |
|---|---|---|---|---|
| Labor | Luke Edmunds | 8,449 | 43.73 | +4.25 |
| Independent | Allison Ritchie | 4,049 | 20.96 | +20.96 |
| Greens | Carly Allen | 3,995 | 20.68 | +1.41 |
| Independent | Tony Mulder | 2,009 | 10.40 | +10.40 |
| Shooters, Fishers, Farmers | Steve Loring | 820 | 4.24 | +1.08 |
| Total formal votes | | 19,322 | 97.73 | +0.79 |
| Informal votes | | 449 | 2.27 | −0.79 |
| Turnout | | 19,771 | 84.07 | +3.83 |
Two-candidate-preferred result
| Labor | Luke Edmunds | 11,217 | 58.18 | −5.08 |
| Independent | Allison Ritchie | 8,062 | 41.82 | +41.82 |
| Labor hold | | | | |

Swings are calculated from the 2022 by-election.
