= 2007 Tasmanian Legislative Council periodic election =

Legislative election in Tasmania, Australia

← 2006	6 May 2007	2008 →

3 of the 15 seats in the Legislative Council 8 seats needed for a majority
	First party	Second party
Party	Independent	Labor
Seats before	2	1
Seats won	2	1
Seat change	Steady	Steady

Periodic elections for the Tasmanian Legislative Council were held on 6 May 2007. The three seats up for election were Montgomery, held by independent MLC Sue Smith; Nelson, held by independent MLC Jim Wilkinson; and Pembroke, held by Labor MLC Allison Ritchie. Montgomery was last contested in 2002, while Nelson and Pembroke were last contested in 2001.

== Montgomery ==
Independent MLC Sue Smith was elected to the Council for the seat of Leven in 1997, and successfully transferred to the new seat of Montgomery in 2002. She was not opposed in this election.

=== Montgomery Results ===
Tasmanian Legislative Council periodic elections, 2007: Montgomery
Party	Candidate	Votes	%	±%
Independent	Sue Smith	unopposed		
Independent hold		Swing		

== Nelson ==
Independent MLC Jim Wilkinson first entered the Council as the member for Queenborough in 1995, successfully transferring to Nelson in 2001. His only opponent was Tom Nilsson of the Tasmanian Greens, an anti-population-growth activist.

=== Nelson Results ===
Tasmanian Legislative Council periodic elections, 2007: Nelson
Party	Candidate	Votes	%	±%
Independent	Jim Wilkinson	11,232	61.60	+12.61
Greens	Tom Nilsson	7,003	38.40	+38.40
Total formal votes		18,235	97.36	+0.83
Informal votes		494	2.64	−0.83
Turnout		18,729	81.01	−1.06
Independent hold		Swing	+3.03	

== Pembroke ==
Labor MLC Allison Ritchie had held Pembroke since defeating independent member Cathy Edwards in 2001, in a result attributed to dissatisfaction with Edwards' dual role as MLC and Mayor of Clarence. On her election Ritchie was the youngest member ever elected to the Legislative Council. In 2007 she faced five opponents. The only other party to endorse a candidate was the Tasmanian Greens, who ran protester and former candidate Neil Smith. The four independents were: Clarence alderman Richard James, a former Liberal and Democrat serial candidate; John Peers, another Clarence alderman; former Clarence alderman David Jackson; and Hobart City Council alderman Marti Zucco.

Ritchie won a majority while there were still three candidates in the count, so a two-party preferred count was not conducted.

=== Pembroke Results ===
Tasmanian Legislative Council periodic elections, 2007: Pembroke
Party	Candidate	Votes	%	±%
Labor	Allison Ritchie	8,513	42.87	−14.22
Independent	Richard James	3,650	18.38	+18.38
Greens	Neil Smith	2,662	13.41	+13.41
Independent	Marti Zucco	2,332	11.74	+11.74
Independent	John Peers	1,839	9.26	+9.26
Independent	David Jackson	860	4.33	+4.33
Total formal votes		19,856	96.74	+0.09
Informal votes		669	3.26	−0.09
Turnout		20,525	87.52	−1.55
After distribution of preferences from three excluded candidates
Labor	Allison Ritchie	10,161	51.46	
Independent	Richard James	6,156	31.18	
Greens	Neil Smith	3,428	17.36	
Labor hold		Swing		
