= 2013 Tasmanian Legislative Council periodic election =

Legislative election in Tasmania, Australia

← 2012	6 May 2013	2014 →

3 of the 15 seats in the Legislative Council 8 seats needed for a majority
	First party	Second party
Party	Liberal	Independent
Seats before	1	2
Seats won	2	1
Seat change	▲1	▼1

Periodic elections for the Tasmanian Legislative Council were held on 6 May 2013. The three seats up for election were Montgomery, Nelson and Pembroke.

== Montgomery ==
The electoral division of Montgomery was created in 1999, and was held by independent MLC Sue Smith until her retirement on 4 May 2013. Smith had been re-elected unopposed at the previous periodic election in 2007, so no swings are calculated in the results below.

=== Montgomery Results ===
Tasmanian Legislative Council periodic elections, 2013: Montgomery
Party	Candidate	Votes	%	±%
Liberal	Leonie Hiscutt	9,008	45.9	N/A
Independent	Cheryl Fuller	5,869	29.9	N/A
Independent	Kevin Morgan	2,836	14.5	N/A
Independent	Ed Vincent	1,906	9.7	N/A
Total formal votes		19,619	94.7	N/A
Informal votes		1,096	5.3	N/A
Turnout		20,715	86.8	N/A
Two-candidate-preferred result
Liberal	Leonie Hiscutt	10,887	55.5	N/A
Independent	Cheryl Fuller	8,732	44.5	N/A
Liberal gain from Independent		Swing	N/A	

== Nelson ==
The electoral division of Nelson has been held by the independent MLC and Legislative Council President Jim Wilkinson since 1999. Allocation of preferences ceases when one candidate gains more than 50 per cent of the vote.

=== Nelson Results ===
Tasmanian Legislative Council periodic elections, 2013: Nelson
Party	Candidate	Votes	%	±%
Independent	Jim Wilkinson	8,847	48.7	−12.9
Greens	Tom Baxter	4,627	25.5	−12.9
Independent	Helen Richardson	3,204	17.7	+17.7
Independent	Hans Willink	1,472	8.1	+8.1
Total formal votes		18,150	96.5	−0.9
Informal votes		668	3.5	+0.9
Turnout		18,818	81.9	−4.9
After transfer of Willink's votes
Independent	Jim Wilkinson	9,494	52.31	N/A
Greens	Tom Baxter	4,859	26.8	N/A
Independent	Helen Richardson	3,797	20.9	N/A
Independent hold		Swing	N/A	

== Pembroke ==
The previous election in Pembroke had been a by-election held on 1 August 2009, which was won by Vanessa Goodwin of the Liberal Party.

=== Pembroke Results ===
Tasmanian Legislative Council periodic elections, 2013: Pembroke
Party	Candidate	Votes	%	±%
Liberal	Vanessa Goodwin	10,469	51.1	+12.6
Independent	Allison Ritchie	7,370	36.0	+36.0
Greens	Wendy Heatley	2,124	12.9	+0.1
Total formal votes		20,486	96.4	−0.1
Informal votes		774	3.6	+0.1
Turnout		21,260	86.0	+0.9
Liberal hold		Swing	N/A	
