= Electoral results for the Division of Montgomery =

This is a list of electoral results for the electoral division of Montgomery in Tasmanian Legislative Council elections since 2005, when candidate political affiliations were first recorded in the official record.

== Members ==
Member	Party	Period
Sue Smith	Independent	1999–2013
Leonie Hiscutt	Liberal	2013–2025
Casey Hiscutt	Independent	2025–present

== Election results ==
=== Elections in the 2020s ===
==== 2025 ====
2025 Tasmanian Legislative Council periodic elections: Montgomery
Party	Candidate	Votes	%	±%
Independent	Casey Hiscutt	7,546	32.00	+32.00
Liberal	Stephen Parry	6,895	29.24	−15.15
Greens	Darren Briggs	5,101	21.63	+21.63
Shooters, Fishers, Farmers	Adrian Pickin	3,038	12.88	+2.07
Independent	Gatty Burnett	1,002	4.25	+4.25
Total formal votes		23,582	96.31	+0.09
Informal votes		903	3.69	−0.09
Turnout		24,485	82.10	−2.16
Two-party-preferred result
Independent	Casey Hiscutt	14,449	61.70	+61.70
Liberal	Stephen Parry	8,968	38.30	−21.87
Independent gain from Liberal				

=== Elections in the 2010s ===
==== 2019 ====
2019 Tasmanian Legislative Council periodic elections: Montgomery
Party	Candidate	Votes	%	±%
Liberal	Leonie Hiscutt	10,047	44.39	−1.52
Labor	Michelle Rippon	5,722	25.28	+25.28
Independent	Cheryl Fuller	4,416	19.51	−10.40
Shooters, Fishers, Farmers	Brenton Jones	2,446	10.81	+10.81
Total formal votes		22,631	96.22	+1.51
Informal votes		889	3.78	−1.51
Turnout		23,520	84.26	−2.54
Two-party-preferred result
Liberal	Leonie Hiscutt	13,617	60.17	N/A
Labor	Michelle Rippon	9,014	39.83	N/A
Liberal hold		Swing	N/A	

==== 2013 ====
Tasmanian Legislative Council periodic elections, 2013: Montgomery
Party	Candidate	Votes	%	±%
Liberal	Leonie Hiscutt	9,008	45.9	N/A
Independent	Cheryl Fuller	5,869	29.9	N/A
Independent	Kevin Morgan	2,836	14.5	N/A
Independent	Ed Vincent	1,906	9.7	N/A
Total formal votes		19,619	94.7	N/A
Informal votes		1,096	5.3	N/A
Turnout		20,715	86.8	N/A
Two-candidate-preferred result
Liberal	Leonie Hiscutt	10,887	55.5	N/A
Independent	Cheryl Fuller	8,732	44.5	N/A
Liberal gain from Independent		Swing	N/A	

=== Elections in the 2000s ===
==== 2007 ====
Tasmanian Legislative Council periodic elections, 2007: Montgomery
Party	Candidate	Votes	%	±%
Independent	Sue Smith	unopposed		
Independent hold		Swing		
