= Electoral results for the Division of Nelson (Tasmania) =

This is a list of electoral results for the electoral division of Nelson in Tasmanian Legislative Council elections since 2005, when candidate political affiliations were first recorded in the official record.

== Members ==
Member	Party	Period
Jim Wilkinson	Independent	1999–2019
Meg Webb	Independent	2019–present

== Election results ==
=== Elections in the 2020s ===
==== 2025 ====
2025 Tasmanian Legislative Council periodic elections: Nelson
Party	Candidate	Votes	%	±%
Independent	Meg Webb	10,619	51.70	+37.89
Liberal	Marcus Vermey	7,031	34.23	+10.54
Greens	Nathan Volf	2,889	14.07	+2.93
Total formal votes		20,539	98.12	+0.88
Informal votes		394	1.88	−0.88
Turnout		20,933	81.90	−0.41
Independent hold				

=== Elections in the 2010s ===
==== 2019 ====
2019 Tasmanian Legislative Council periodic elections: Nelson
Party	Candidate	Votes	%	±%
Liberal	Nic Street	4,567	23.69	+23.69
Independent	Vica Bayley	3,069	15.92	+15.92
Independent	Meg Webb	2,662	13.81	+13.81
Independent	Madeleine Ogilvie	2,420	12.55	+12.55
Greens	Deborah Brewer	2,147	11.14	−14.36
Independent	Blair Brownless	1,223	6.34	+6.34
Independent	John (Polly) Farmer	1,168	6.06	+6.06
Independent	Richard Griggs	960	4.98	+4.98
Independent	Robert Manning	669	3.47	+3.47
Shooters, Fishers, Farmers	Lorraine Bennett	394	2.04	+2.04
Total formal votes		19,279	97.24	+0.79
Informal votes		547	2.76	−0.79
Turnout		19,826	82.31	+0.44
Two-candidate-preferred result
Independent	Meg Webb	10,648	59.26	N/A
Liberal	Nic Street	7,320	40.74	N/A
Independent hold		Swing	N/A	

==== 2013 ====
Tasmanian Legislative Council periodic elections, 2013: Nelson
Party	Candidate	Votes	%	±%
Independent	Jim Wilkinson	8,847	48.7	−12.9
Greens	Tom Baxter	4,627	25.5	−12.9
Independent	Helen Richardson	3,204	17.7	+17.7
Independent	Hans Willink	1,472	8.1	+8.1
Total formal votes		18,150	96.5	−0.9
Informal votes		668	3.5	+0.9
Turnout		18,818	81.9	−4.9
After transfer of Willink's votes
Independent	Jim Wilkinson	9,494	52.31	N/A
Greens	Tom Baxter	4,859	26.8	N/A
Independent	Helen Richardson	3,797	20.9	N/A
Independent hold		Swing	N/A	

=== Elections in the 2000s ===
==== 2007 ====
Tasmanian Legislative Council periodic elections, 2007: Nelson
Party	Candidate	Votes	%	±%
Independent	Jim Wilkinson	11,232	61.60	+12.61
Greens	Tom Nilsson	7,003	38.40	+38.40
Total formal votes		18,235	97.36	+0.83
Informal votes		494	2.64	−0.83
Turnout		18,729	81.01	−1.06
Independent hold		Swing	+3.03	
