= Dunbabin =

Dunbabin is a surname. Notable people with the surname include:

- Thomas Dunbabin (1911–1955), Australian classicist scholar and archaeologist of Tasmanian origin.
- William Dunbabin (1894–1975), Australian politician.
- Jean Dunbabin, honorary fellow of St Anne's College, University of Oxford.

== See also ==
- Dunbabin Point, small peninsula which lies near Daltons beach, in the south east of Tasmania.
