= Results of the 1994 Tasmanian local elections =

- 14–26 March 1994
- Registered: 256,604
- Turnout: 141,059 (55.0%)

Only 17 of the then 29 councils held elections in 1994. Following a significant local government overhaul in 1993 that saw the number of councils decreased from 46 to 29, the 12 amalgamated councils held elections in 1993 and so skipped the 1994 election. This was also the first time universal postal ballots were used for Tasmanian local government elections, though only as a trial.

301 candidates ran for 178 councillor and mayor position and all contests were held except for the Sorell Council District of Dodges Ferry.

== Burnie ==
1994 Burnie City Council Election
- 14–26 March 1994

8 of the 12 seats on Burnie City Council 7 seats needed for a majority
- Mayor
	First party	Second party
	IND	IND
Candidate	Sandra French	Jim Altimira
Party	Independent	Independent
Primary vote	4,823	3,119
Percentage	60.7%	39.3%
Mayor before election
Sandra French
Independent
Elected Mayor
Sandra French
Independent
- Deputy Mayor
	First party	Second party
	IND	IND
Candidate	Graeme Evan Smith	David Currie
Party	Independent	Independent
Primary vote	3,992	3,821
Percentage	51.1%	48.9%
Elected Deputy Mayor
Graeme Evan Smith
Independent
- Councillors
Party	Leader	Vote %	Seats	+/–
Independents	N/A	100.0	6	
This lists parties that won seats. See the complete results below.

=== Burnie mayor ===
1994 Tasmanian mayoral elections: Burnie
Party	Candidate	Votes	%	±%
Independent	Sandra French	4,823	60.7	
Independent	Jim Altimira	3,119	39.3	
Total formal votes		7,942	99.1	
Informal votes		71	0.9	
Turnout				
Sandra French hold				

=== Burnie deputy mayor ===
1994 Tasmanian deputy mayoral elections: Burnie
Party	Candidate	Votes	%	±%
Independent	Graeme Evan Smith	3,992	51.1	
Independent	Currie	3,821	48.9	
Total formal votes		7,813	97.5	
Informal votes		200	2.5	
Turnout				

=== Burnie results ===
1994 Tasmanian local elections: Burnie
Party	Candidate	Votes	%	±%
Independent	Noel William Atkins (elected 1)	1,209	15.2	
Independent	David Currie (elected 2)	1,168	14.7	
Independent	John Munro (elected 4)	1,151	14.5	
Independent	Steven Kons (elected 3)	1,105	13.9	
Independent	Ross Lyon Elphinstone (elected 6)	860	10.8	
Independent	Jane Tanner (elected 5)	692	8.7	
Independent	Jordan	677	8.5	
Independent	Hainsworth	360	4.5	
Independent	Berry	329	4.1	
Independent	Cranny	202	2.5	
Independent	Pigot	185	2.3	
Total formal votes		7,938	99.1	
Informal votes		75	0.9	
Rejected declarations		205	2.5	
Turnout		8,244	56.6	

== Circular Head ==
1994 Circular Head Council Election
- 14–26 March 1994

All 10 seats on Circular Head Council 5 full terms and 5 half terms
- Registered: 5,712
- Turnout: 3,923 (68.7%)

=== Circular Head Council ===
1994 Tasmanian local elections: Circular Head Council
Party	Candidate	Votes	%	±%
Independent	Wendy Marilyn Schoenmaker (elected 1)	832	21.88	
Independent	William Ross Hine (elected 2)	592	15.57	
Independent	James Smith (elected 3)	560	14.73	
Independent	Michael William Weldon (elected 4)	401	10.54	
Independent	Robert Ambrose (elected 5)	180	4.73	
Independent	Nicki Stephens (elected 6)	173	4.55	
Independent	Daryl Quilliam (elected 7)	158	4.15	
Independent	Bernard John Charles (elected 8)	167	4.39	
Independent	Peter Francis Brown (elected 9)	166	4.36	
Independent	Robert L. Dunn (elected 10)	117	3.08	
Independent	Benson	116	3.05	
Independent	Poke	147	3.87	
Independent	Walford	102	2.68	
Independent	Aldridge	90	2.37	
Total formal votes		3,803	98.9	
Informal votes		44	1.1	
Rejected declarations		76	1.9	
Turnout		3,923	68.7	

== Clarence ==
1994 Clarence City Council Election
- 14–26 March 1994

All 12 seats on Clarence City Council 7 seats needed for a majority
- Mayor
	First party	Second party	Third party
	IND	IND	IND
Candidate	Cathy Edwards	Readett	James
Party	Independent	Independent	Independent
Primary vote	10,715	3,448	3,372
Percentage	61.1%	19.7%	19.23%
Mayor before election
Cathy Edwards
Independent
Elected Mayor
Cathy Edwards
Independent
- Deputy Mayor
	First party	Second party	Third party
	IND	IND	IND
Candidate	Leslie Glover	Traynor	Rogerson
Party	Independent	Independent	Independent
Primary vote	5,607	3,448	3,300
Percentage	32.1%	23.3%	18.9%
Deputy Mayor before election
Leslie Glover
Independent
Elected Deputy Mayor
Leslie Glover
Independent
- Councillors
Party	Leader	Vote %	Seats	+/–
Independents	N/A	100.0	12	
This lists parties that won seats. See the complete results below.

Clarence City Council is composed of 12 councillors. The first six councillors were elected to a full four-year term, while the other six winners were elected to a two-year half-term.

Cathy Edwards was re-elected mayor, and Leslie Glover was re-elected deputy mayor.

=== Clarence mayor ===
1994 Tasmanian mayoral elections: Clarence
Party	Candidate	Votes	%	±%
Independent	Cathy Edwards	10,715	61.1	
Independent	Readett	3,448	19.7	
Independent	James	3,372	19.2	
Total formal votes		17,535	99.6	
Informal votes		77	0.4	
Turnout		17,612		
Cathy Edwards hold		Swing		

=== Clarence deputy mayor ===
1994 Tasmanian deputy mayoral elections: Clarence
Party	Candidate	Votes	%	±%
Independent	Leslie Glover	5,607	32.1	
Independent	Traynor	4,056	23.3	
Independent	Rogerson	3,300	18.9	
Independent	Peers	2,960	16.0	
Independent	Denholm	1,518	8.7	
Total formal votes		17,441	99.0	
Informal votes		171	1.0	
Turnout		17,612		
Leslie Glover hold		Swing		

=== Clarence results ===
1994 Tasmanian local elections: Clarence
Party	Candidate	Votes	%	±%
Independent	Cathy Edwards (elected 1)	5,949	34.90	
Independent	Michael Readitt (elected 2)	2,022	11.86	
Independent	Richard James (elected 3)	1,743	10.22	
Independent	Leslie Glover (elected 4)	961	5.64	
Independent	David Traynor (elected 5)	803	4.71	
Independent	John Phillip Peers (elected 6)	776	4.55	
Independent	John Rogerson (elected 7)	532	3.12	
Independent	Beverley Evans (elected 8)	526	3.08	
Independent	David W. Eddington (elected 9)	832	4.88	
Independent	Bill Ryan (elected 10)	598	3.50	
Independent	Marjan Irene Geurson (elected 11)	373	2.19	
Independent	Jock Campbell (elected 12)	386	2.26	
Independent	Denholm	182	1.07	
Independent	Fassina	401	2.35	
Independent	Cannock	306	1.80	
Independent	Smith	422	2.48	
Independent	Vance	235	1.38	
Total formal votes		17,047	96.9	
Informal votes		542	3.1	
Rejected declarations		523	2.9	
Turnout		18,174	52.2	

== Devonport ==
1994 Devonport City Council Election
- 14–26 March 1994

Half the seats on Devonport City Council
- Registered: 17,933
- Turnout: 10,596 (59.1%)

1994 Tasmanian local elections: City of Devonport
Party	Candidate	Votes	%	±%
Independent				
Independent				
Total formal votes				
Informal votes				
Turnout				

== Flinders ==
1994 Flinders Council Election
- 14–26 March 1994

Half the seats on Flinders Council
- Registered: 781
- Turnout: 651 (83.4%)

1994 Tasmanian local elections: Flinders Council
Party	Candidate	Votes	%	±%
Independent				
Independent				
Total formal votes				
Informal votes				
Turnout				

== George Town ==
1994 George Town Council Election
- 14–26 March 1994

Half the seats on George Town Council
- Registered: 5,068
- Turnout: 3,580 (70.6%)

1994 Tasmanian local elections: George Town Council
Party	Candidate	Votes	%	±%
Independent				
Independent				
Total formal votes				
Informal votes				
Turnout				

== Glamorgan-Spring Bay ==
1994 Glamorgan-Spring Bay Council Election
- 14–26 March 1994

Half plus 1 of the seats on Glamorgan-Spring Bay Council
- Registered: 3,428
- Turnout: 2,471 (72.1%)

A by-election due to a councillor resignation was held alongside the normally scheduled election.

1994 Tasmanian local elections: Glamorgan-Spring Bay Council
Party	Candidate	Votes	%	±%
Independent				
Independent				
Total formal votes				
Informal votes				
Turnout				

== Glenorchy ==
1994 Glenorchy City Council Election
- 14–26 March 1994

Half the seats on Glenorchy City Council
- Registered: 32,056
- Turnout: 16,913 (52.8%)

1994 Tasmanian local elections: City of Glenorchy
Party	Candidate	Votes	%	±%
Independent				
Independent				
Total formal votes				
Informal votes				
Turnout				

== Hobart ==
1994 Hobart City Council Election
- 14–26 March 1994

Half the seats on Hobart City Council
- Registered: 33,887
- Turnout: 18,328 (54.1%)

1994 Tasmanian local elections: City of Hobart
Party	Candidate	Votes	%	±%
Independent				
Independent				
Total formal votes				
Informal votes				
Turnout				

== Kentish ==
1994 Kentish Council Election
- 14–26 March 1994

Half the seats on Kentish Council
- Registered: 14,572
- Turnout: 8,244 (56.6%)

1994 Tasmanian local elections: Kentish Council
Party	Candidate	Votes	%	±%
Independent				
Independent				
Total formal votes				
Informal votes				
Turnout				

== Kingborough ==
1994 Kingborough Council Election
- 14–26 March 1994

Half the seats on Kingborough Council
- Registered: 17,841
- Turnout: 99,394 (52.7%)

1994 Tasmanian local elections: Kingborough Council
Party	Candidate	Votes	%	±%
Independent				
Independent				
Total formal votes				
Informal votes				
Turnout				

== Latrobe ==
1994 Latrobe Council Election
- 14–26 March 1994

Half the seats on Latrobe Council
- Registered: 5,259
- Turnout: 3,396 (64.6%)

1994 Tasmanian local elections: Latrobe Council
Party	Candidate	Votes	%	±%
Independent				
Independent				
Total formal votes				
Informal votes				
Turnout				

== Launceston ==
1994 Launceston City Council Election
- 14–26 March 1994

Half the seats on Launceston City Council
- Registered: 45,554
- Turnout: 22,404 (49.2%)

1994 Tasmanian local elections: East Ward
Party	Candidate	Votes	%	±%
Independent				
Independent				
Total formal votes				
Informal votes				
Turnout			7,969	50.8%

1994 Tasmanian local elections: North Ward
Party	Candidate	Votes	%	±%
Independent				
Independent				
Total formal votes				
Informal votes				
Turnout		6,538	46.1%	

1994 Tasmanian local elections: South West Ward
Party	Candidate	Votes	%	±%
Independent				
Independent				
Total formal votes				
Informal votes				
Turnout		7,897	50.4%	

== New Norfolk ==
1994 New Norfolk Council Election
- 14–26 March 1994

Half the seats on New Norfolk Council
- Registered: 6,466
- Turnout: 3,205 (49.6%)

1994 Tasmanian local elections: Municipality of New Norfolk
Party	Candidate	Votes	%	±%
Independent				
Independent				
Total formal votes				
Informal votes				
Turnout				

== Sorell ==
1994 Sorell Council Election
- 14–26 March 1994

Half the seats on Sorell Council
- Registered: 4,442
- Turnout: 2,691 (60.6%)

The District of Dodges Ferry only received four nominations, filling all positions unopposed.

1994 Tasmanian local elections: Sorell Ward
Party	Candidate	Votes	%	±%
Independent				
Independent				
Total formal votes				
Informal votes				
Turnout		1,755	57.4%	

1994 Tasmanian local elections: Dunalley Ward
Party	Candidate	Votes	%	±%
Independent				
Independent				
Total formal votes				
Informal votes				
Turnout		936	67.6%	

1994 Tasmanian local elections: District of Doges Ferry
Party	Candidate	Votes	%	±%
Independent	(elected unopposed)			
Independent	(elected unopposed)			
Independent	(elected unopposed)			
Independent	(elected unopposed)			
Total formal votes				
Informal votes				
Turnout		1,755	57.4%	

== Tasman ==
1994 Tasman Council Election
- 14–26 March 1994

Half the seats on Tasman Council
- Registered: 2,039
- Turnout: 1,711 (83.9%)

1994 Tasmanian local elections: Municipality of New Norfolk
Party	Candidate	Votes	%	±%
Independent				
Independent				
Total formal votes				
Informal votes				
Turnout				

== Waratah-Wynyard ==
1994 Waratah-Wynyard Council Election
- 14–26 March 1994

Half the seats on Waratah-Wynyard Council
- Registered: 9,919
- Turnout: 5,886 (59.3%)

1994 Tasmanian local elections: Waratah-Wynyard Council
Party	Candidate	Votes	%	±%
Independent				
Independent				
Total formal votes				
Informal votes				
Turnout				

== West Tamar ==
1994 West Tamar Council Election
- 14–26 March 1994

Half the seats on West Tamar Council
- Registered: 13,175
- Turnout: 7,166 (54.0%)

1994 Tasmanian local elections: West Tamar Council
Party	Candidate	Votes	%	±%
Independent				
Independent				
Total formal votes				
Informal votes				
Turnout				
