= 2017 Pembroke state by-election =

- 4 November 2017
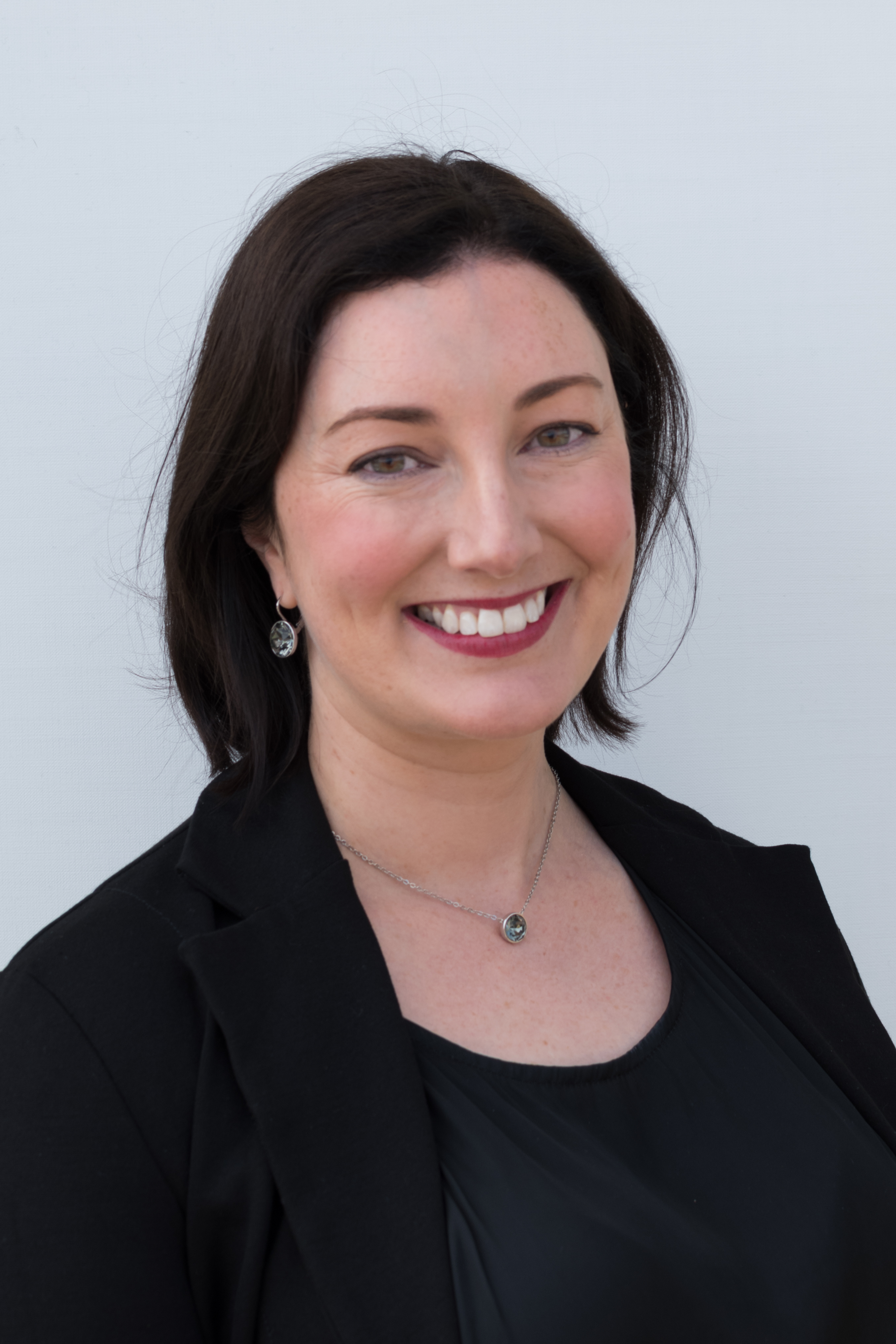

	First party	Second party	Third party
			IND
Candidate	Jo Siejka	James Walker	Doug Chipman
Party	Labor	Liberal	Independent
Primary vote	6,846	5,468	4,212
Percentage	32.2%	25.8%	19.9%
Swing	▲32.2	▼25.3	▲19.9
TPP	57.4%	42.6%
MLC before election
Vanessa Goodwin
Liberal
Elected MLC
Jo Siejka
Labor

A by-election was held in the Tasmanian Legislative Council division of Pembroke on 4 November 2017. It was triggered by the resignation of sitting member Vanessa Goodwin, who was diagnosed with brain cancer.

== Background ==
The electoral division of Pembroke is located on the eastern shore of the River Derwent in Hobart.

Vanessa Goodwin, a member of the Liberal Party, was elected on 1 August 2009 at a by-election to replace Labor member Allison Ritchie who had resigned. When the Liberals won government in 2014, Goodwin was appointed as Attorney-General, Minister for Justice, Minister for Corrections and Minister for the Arts.

On 25 March 2017, Goodwin was hospitalised with multiple brain tumours. On 6 April, Premier Will Hodgman informed the parliament that she was not expected to recover. Goodwin resigned on 2 October 2017.

== Results ==
Tasmanian Legislative Council by-election, 2017: Pembroke
Party	Candidate	Votes	%	±%
Labor	Jo Siejka	6,846	32.2	+32.2
Liberal	James Walker	5,468	25.8	−25.3
Independent	Doug Chipman	4,212	19.9	+19.9
Greens	Bill Harvey	1,977	9.3	−1.0
Independent	Richard James	1,563	7.4	+7.4
Shooters, Fishers, Farmers	Carlo Di Falco	649	3.1	+3.1
Independent	Hans Willink	497	2.3	+2.3
Total formal votes		21,212	96.5	+0.1
Informal votes		772	3.5	−0.1
Turnout		21,984	84.3	−1.7
Two-party-preferred result
Labor	Jo Siejka	11,862	57.4	N/A
Liberal	James Walker	8,786	42.6	N/A
Labor gain from Liberal				
