= 2022 Pembroke state by-election =

- 10 September 2022
- Registered: 23,286

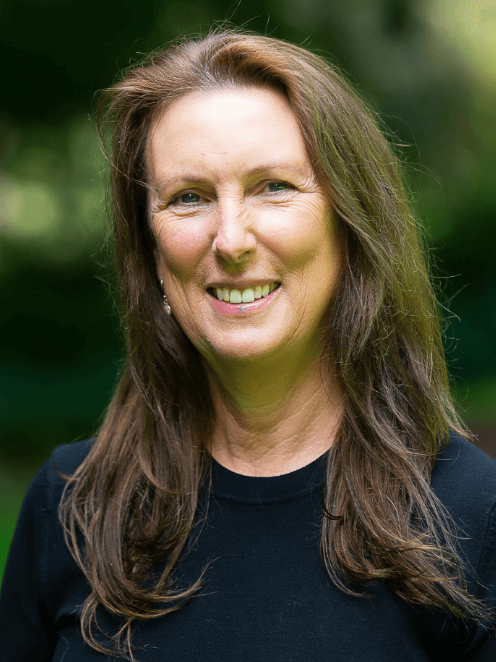
	First party	Second party	Third party
Candidate	Luke Edmunds	Gregory Brown	Deborah Brewer
Party	Labor	Liberal	Greens
Primary vote	7,176	5,234	3,502
Percentage	39.48%	28.79%	19.27%
Swing	▼5.77	▲3.50	▲19.27
TPP	63.26%	36.74%
TPP swing	▲4.61	▼4.61
MLC before election
Jo Siejka
Labor
Elected MLC
Luke Edmunds
Labor

A by-election was in the Tasmanian Legislative Council seat of Pembroke on 10 September 2022, triggered by the resignation of Jo Siejka, who did so in order to spend more time with her family.

== Background ==
Jo Siejka, nominated by the Australian Labor Party, was first elected to the seat of Pembroke at a 2017 by-election following the resignation Vanessa Goodwin who had been diagnosed with multiple brain tumours in March of that year, defeating her Liberal opponent by 7.4% in the two-party preferred count. Siejka, who was Leader of the Opposition in the Legislative Council and held the shadow portfolios of disability, ageing and veterans, announced that she would resign before the expiry of her electoral mandate, in order to spend more time with her family.

== Candidates ==
Candidates are listed in alphabetical order:

Party	Candidate	Background
Greens	Deborah Brewer	Teacher
Liberal	Gregory Brown	Small business owner
Shooters, Fishers, Farmers	Carlo Di Falco	Groundsman, previous candidate in 2017
Labor	Luke Edmunds	Councillor, City of Clarence
Independent	Hans Willink	IT project assurance, previous candidate in 2017

== Results ==
2022 Pembroke state by-election
Party	Candidate	Votes	%	±%
Labor	Luke Edmunds	7,176	39.48	−5.77
Liberal	Gregory Brown	5,234	28.79	+3.50
Greens	Deborah Brewer	3,502	19.27	+19.27
Independent	Hans Willink	1,692	9.31	+9.31
Shooters, Fishers, Farmers	Carlo Di Falco	574	3.16	−0.51
Total formal votes		18,178	96.94	+0.17
Informal votes		573	3.06	−0.17
Turnout		18,751	80.52	−5.11
Two-party-preferred result
Labor	Luke Edmunds	11,467	63.26	+4.61
Liberal	Gregory Brown	6,660	36.74	−4.61
Labor hold		Swing	+4.61	
