= 2009 Pembroke state by-election =

- 1 August 2009
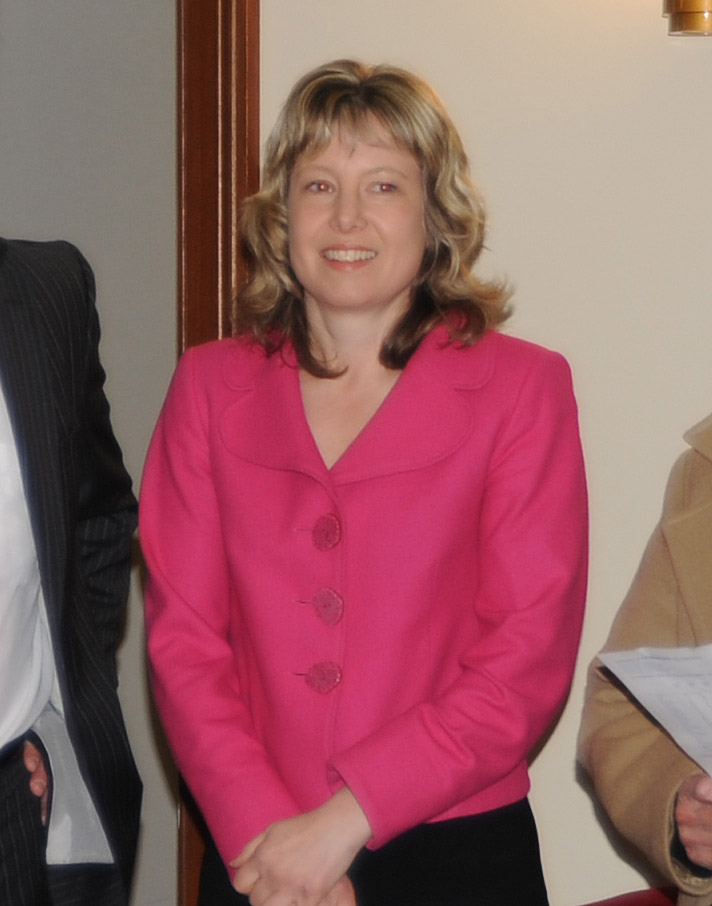
	First party	Second party
		IND
Candidate	Vanessa Goodwin	Richard James
Party	Liberal	Independent
First preference vote	7,812	2,285
Percentage	38.55%	11.28%
Swing	▲38.55pp	▼7.10pp
Three-candidate-preferred	51.05%	27.73%
	Third party	Fourth party
	GRN	IND
Candidate	Wendy Heatley	Honey Bacon
Party	Greens	Independent
First preference vote	2,604	2,110
Percentage	12.85%	10.41%
Swing	▼0.56pp	▼10.41pp
Three-candidate-preferred	21.22%	Eliminated
MLC before election
Allison Ritchie
Labor
Elected MLC
Vanessa Goodwin
Liberal

A by-election was held in the Tasmanian Legislative Council division of Pembroke on 1 August 2009. It was triggered by the resignation of sitting member Allison Ritchie.

== Background ==
Ritchie was first elected to the Legislative Council in 2001 at the age of 26, the youngest person ever elected to that chamber. She spent nine and a half weeks as Minister for Planning and Workplace Relations in 2008, but resigned due to ill health. She announced her resignation from parliament amid allegations of nepotism on 20 June 2009.

== Candidates ==
The writ for the by-election was issued on 30 June 2009; nominations closed on 9 July. The eight candidates were:

- Independent — Honey Bacon, widow of former Tasmanian Premier Jim Bacon.
- Independent — Peter Cooper, a Clarence City Alderman (2008–present).
- Independent — James Crotty, former Labor candidate and considered the unofficial representative of the Government.
- Liberal Party — Vanessa Goodwin, a 39-year-old lawyer and criminologist, was previously the Liberal candidate for the state seat of Franklin in 2006 and the federal candidate for the equivalent seat in 2007, achieving a rare swing to the Liberal Party.
- Tasmanian Greens — Wendy Heatley, a 46-year-old lawyer.
- Independent — Richard James, a Clarence City Alderman( 1984–89, 1994–present). James previously contested Pembroke in 1995, 1999 and 2007.
- Independent — John Peers, a Clarence City Alderman (1994–present).
- Independent — Kit (Sharon) Soo, a public relations consultant.

== Results ==
Pembroke state by-election, 2009
Party	Candidate	Votes	%	±%
Liberal	Vanessa Goodwin	7,812	38.55	+38.55
Greens	Wendy Heatley	2,604	12.85	–0.56
Independent	Richard James	2,285	11.28	–7.10
Independent Labor	Honey Bacon	2,110	10.41	+10.41
Independent	John Peers	1,942	9.58	+0.32
Independent Labor	James Crotty	1,783	8.80	+8.80
Independent	Peter Cooper	1,510	7.45	+7.45
Independent	Kit (Sharon) Soo	219	1.08	+1.08
Total formal votes		20,265	96.48	–0.26
Informal votes		740	3.52	+0.26
Turnout		21,005	85.05	–2.47
After distribution of preferences
Liberal	Vanessa Goodwin	10,143	51.05	
Independent	Richard James	5,510	27.73	
Greens	Wendy Heatley	4,215	21.22	
Liberal gain from Labor		Swing	N/A	
