= Marcus Vermey =

Member of the Tasmanian Parliament since 2025

Marcus Vermey MP

Government Whip of the House of Assembly
- Incumbent
- Assumed office 7 August 2025
- Premier: Jeremy Rockliff
- Preceded by: Simon Wood

Member of the Tasmanian House of Assembly for Clark
- Incumbent
- Assumed office 19 July 2025 Serving with 6 others
- Preceded by: Simon Behrakis

Personal details
- Party: Liberal
- Spouse: Rachel
- Profession: Butcher

Marcus William Vermey is an Australian politician who is serving as a member for Clark in the Tasmanian House of Assembly. A member of the Liberals, he unsuccessfully ran for the Legislative Council district of Nelson in 2025. Later, he was preselected as a Liberal candidate for Clark, defeating incumbent member Simon Behrakis of his own party. Since August 2025, he has served as the government whip in the Third Rockliff ministry.

== Personal life ==
Vermey lives in Sandy Bay and works as a butcher. He has a wife, Rachel.

== Politics ==
Vermey was elected at the 2025 Tasmanian state election. Vermey had previously contested the 2024 Tasmanian state election and 2025 Legislative Council election in Nelson as a Liberal candidate. He received 34.2% of the primary vote in Nelson.

Vermey was appointed government whip by Jeremy Rockliff on 7 August 2025.
