= Ben McKay (politician) =

Australian politician

Eric Charles 'Ben' McKay (29 December 1918, in Cambridge, Tasmania – 11 July 1976, in Hobart) was an independent member of the Tasmanian Legislative Council from 9 May 1959 until his death in the Electoral division of Pembroke.

In the following by election he was succeeded by his son Peter McKay.

Tasmanian Legislative Council
Preceded by William Dunbabin	Member for Pembroke; 1959–1976	Succeeded by Peter McKay
