= 2021 Tasmanian Legislative Council periodic election =

Legislative election in Tasmania, Australia

- 1 May 2021

3 of the 15 seats in the Legislative Council 8 seats needed for a majority
	First party	Second party	Third party
Party	Independent	Liberal	Labor
Seats before	2	0	1
Seats won	1	1	1
Seat change	▼1	▲1	Steady
- Results by electoral division

Periodic elections for the Tasmanian Legislative Council were held on 1 May 2021. The three seats that were up for election are Derwent, Mersey and Windermere. They were last contested in 2015. Only two of the three seats were actually contested, as the incumbent candidate for Mersey, Mike Gaffney, was returned unopposed.

The periodic elections coincided with the snap general election for the House of Assembly.

== Derwent ==
The seat of Derwent has been held by Labor member Craig Farrell since 2011, when he won the seat in a by-election triggered by the resignation of Michael Aird. Farrell has been President of the Tasmanian Legislative Council since May 2019.

=== Derwent Results ===
2021 Tasmanian Legislative Council periodic elections: Derwent
Party	Candidate	Votes	%	±%
Labor	Craig Farrell	10,069	49.09	−15.26
Liberal	Ben Shaw	8,385	40.88	+40.88
Animal Justice	Ivan Davis	2,059	10.04	+10.04
Total formal votes		20,513	94.4	+0.60
Informal votes		1,217	5.60	−0.60
Turnout		21,730	81.64	+1.46
Registered electors		26,618		
Two-party-preferred result
Labor	Craig Farrell	11,415	55.65	−8.69
Liberal	Ben Shaw	9,098	44.35	+44.35
Labor hold		Swing	–8.69	

== Mersey ==
The seat of Mersey was held by the independent Mike Gaffney, first elected in 2009. Gaffney was the only candidate to nominate, and was declared elected unopposed on 1 April 2021.

=== Mersey Results ===
2021 Tasmanian Legislative Council periodic election: Mersey
Party	Candidate	Votes	%	±%
Independent	Mike Gaffney	unopposed		
Independent hold		Swing		

== Windermere ==
The seat of Windermere was held by the independent Ivan Dean from 2003. Dean retired at this election. The seat was won by Liberal candidate Nick Duigan.

=== Windermere Results ===
2021 Tasmanian Legislative Council periodic elections: Windermere
Party	Candidate	Votes	%	±%
Liberal	Nick Duigan	8,048	37.83	+37.83
Labor	Geoff Lyons	5,746	27.01	−1.52
Independent	Will Smith	4,521	21.25	+21.25
Independent	Rob Soward	2,071	9.73	+9.73
Independent	Vivienne Gale	890	4.18	+4.18
Total formal votes		21,276	95.15	+0.44
Informal votes		1,084	4.85	−0.44
Turnout		22,360	81.78	+3.17
Registered electors		27,342		
Two-party-preferred result
Liberal	Nick Duigan	11,400	54.14	+54.14
Labor	Geoff Lyons	9,658	45.86	+1.56
Liberal gain from Independent				
