= Peter McKay (Australian politician) =

Australian politician

Peter Charles McKay was a member of the Tasmanian Legislative Council from 1976 until 1999.

McKay was first elected as an independent member in the Electoral division of Pembroke after his father, Ben McKay died in office. In the ensuing 1976 Pembroke by-election he secured a majority of votes.

He became a member of the Liberal Party in 1991, thus becoming only the second Liberal to hold a seat on the Legislative Council. McKay only faced one election as a Liberal member, in 1995, which he won on preferences.

McKay served as Minister for Health during the Rundle government.

Tasmanian Legislative Council
Preceded by Ben McKay	Member for Pembroke; 1976–1999	Succeeded by Cathy Edwards
