= Dunbabin Point =

Peninsula in Tasmania, Australia

Coordinates: 42.937°S 147.816°E

Dunbabin point is a small peninsula which lies near Daltons beach, in the south east of Tasmania. It forms part of the mouth of King George Sound. It separates a small beach (Beach T 373) from Daltons beach. This narrow 100 metre long beach lies at the base of bluffs rising to 10 metres with a farmhouse and orchards on the slopes behind. Dunbabin point faces south across the sand flats it shares with Daltons Beach.

In 1868 John Dunbabin purchased 101 acres of land in the county of Pembroke in Tasmania.
