= William Dunbabin =

Australian politician

William Dunbabin (26 October 1894 – 3 December 1975) was an Australian politician.

He was born at Bream Creek, Tasmania. In 1953 he was elected to the Tasmanian Legislative Council as the independent member for Pembroke. He served until his defeat in 1959. Dunbabin died in Hobart in 1975.

Tasmanian Legislative Council
Preceded by Archibald Blacklow	Member for Pembroke; 1953–1959	Succeeded by Ben McKay
