= Casey Hiscutt =

Australian politician

The Honourable Casey Hiscutt MLC

Member of the Tasmanian Legislative Council for Montgomery
- Incumbent
- Assumed office 24 May 2024
- Preceded by: Leonie Hiscutt

Personal details
- Party: Independent
- Relations: Des Hiscutt (great-uncle); Hugh Hiscutt (great-uncle)
- Parent: Leonie Hiscutt

Casey Hiscutt is an Australian politician representing Montgomery in the Tasmanian Legislative Council since the 2025 Tasmanian Legislative Council periodic election, succeeding his mother, Leonie Hiscutt, who did not contest the election. Prior to this he was a councillor of Central Coast Council.

Tasmanian Legislative Council
Preceded by Leonie Hiscutt	Member for Montgomery; 2025–present	Incumbent
