= Jo Siejka =

Australian politician

Joanna Siejka (Rostami)
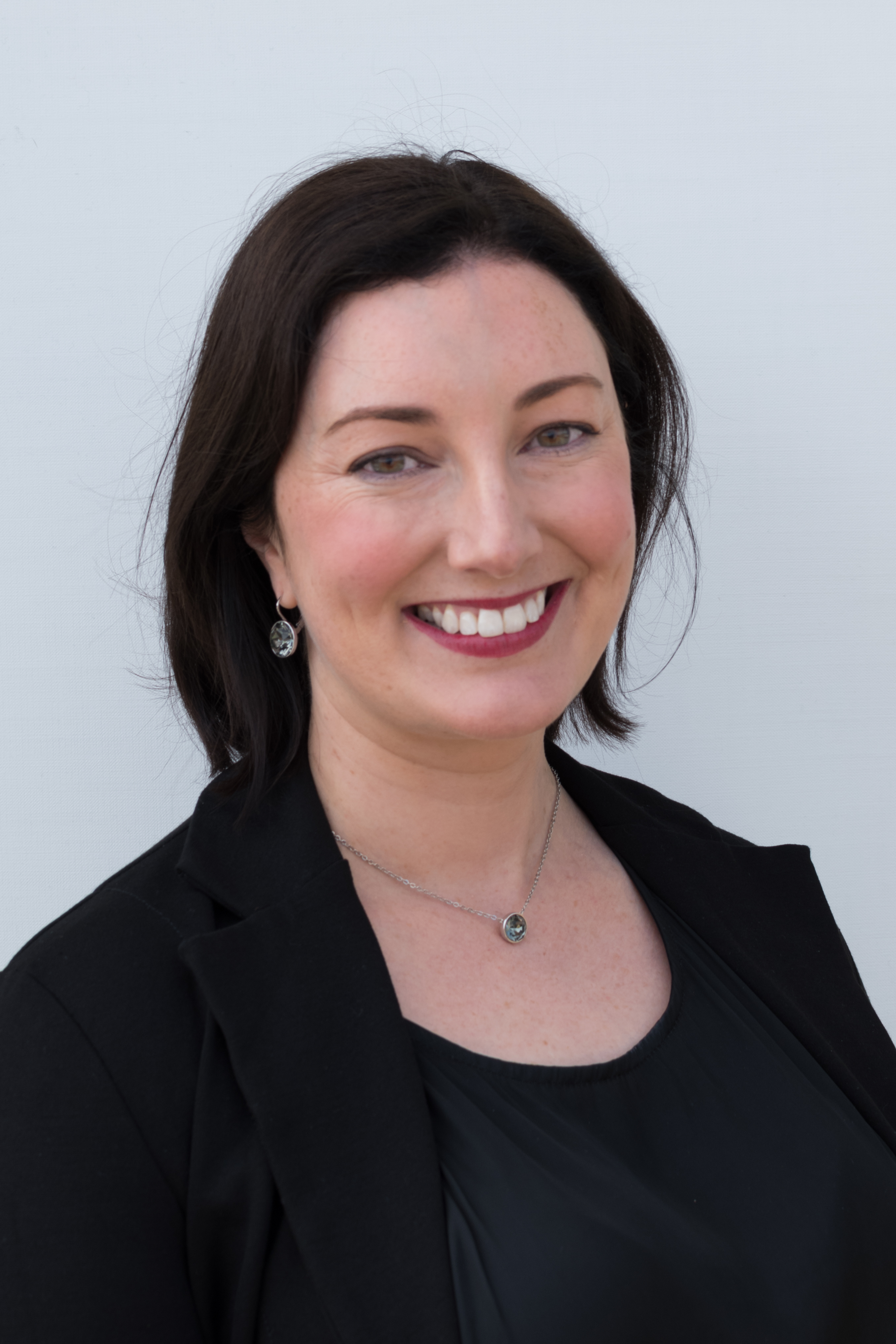

Member of the Tasmanian Legislative Council for Pembroke
- In office 4 November 2017 – 2 August 2022
- Preceded by: Vanessa Goodwin
- Succeeded by: Luke Edmunds

Personal details
- Born: 11 September 1980 (age 46) Hobart, Tasmania, Australia
- Party: Labor Party
- Education: University of Tasmania; Swinburne University of Technology

Joanna Clare Rostami (née: Siejka born 11 September 1980) is an Australian politician and not-for-profit leader.

Siejka was elected as a first-time Labor party candidate to the Tasmanian Legislative Council in a by-election for the electoral division of Pembroke on 4 November 2017. In a field of seven candidates, Siejka won 32.4% of the primary votes^{.}

Siejka won a second term convincingly in 2019 with a 12.5% swing on her primary votes.

In her inaugural speech Siejka spoke about the importance of consultation with community members, key issues raised during the election. Since being elected she has spent time consulting with community members of all ages, and has taken a proactive approach in educating and including members of the Electorate in the Parliamentary process.

She was the Shadow Minister for Disability, Ageing and Veterans, and was the Leader of Opposition in the Upper House.

In 2020, Siejka was the first woman in the Tasmanian Legislative Council to give birth whilst in office, and to have her daughter in the Chamber with her.

In July 2022, Siejka announced her resignation from the Legislative Council so that she could move interstate to be with her husband.

Siejka is now known by her married name, Joanna Rostami, and is currently the national CEO of the youth affairs peak body, the Australian Youth Affairs Coalition.

== Not for profit and governance roles ==
From 2010 until December 2017, Siejka was the chief executive officer of the Youth Network of Tasmania (YNOT). Whilst at the organisation Siejka advocated on behalf of young people on a range of issues including employment, education, health and the retention of young people in the State.

Also in her role at YNOT, she had spoken out against poker machines in pubs and clubs, with the organisation one of a coalition of groups lobbying for the removal or reduction of the machines. She also led the development of a Code of Ethics for the Tasmanian Youth Sector and championed the engagement of young people in decision making through the Tasmanian Youth Forum, a consultation process which was developed by Siejka. Siejka received recognition for her role advocating for young Tasmanians, being nominated for several awards, including as finalist for two Telstra Business Women's Awards.

Siejka has served on Boards of Governance across a number of fields, including terms on the Australian Youth Affairs Coalition, National Youth Coalition for Housing, Homelessness Australia, and the Tasmanian Building and Construction Industry Training Board.

Whilst Chair of the national peak body, National Youth Coalition for Housing, Siejka became a national spokesperson on the issue of youth homelessness, particularly through the international awareness raising campaign, Youth Homelessness Matters Day.

In 2016, Siejka was appointed to the board of TasTAFE, as she put it, to "change the culture" of the organisation after an audit by the Integrity Commission revealed incidents of nepotism and credit card misuse. Siejka resigned from TasTAFE and took leave from YNOT to contest the by-election for Pembroke caused by the resignation of Vanessa Goodwin due to illness.

== Personal ==
Siejka has completed degrees at Swinburne University in social impact and investment, and at the University of Tasmania in media and communications, and counselling. She is an alumnus of the Tasmanian Leaders Program 2013.

Tasmanian Legislative Council
Preceded by Vanessa Goodwin	Member for Pembroke; 2017–2022	Succeeded by Luke Edmunds
