= Cathy Edwards (politician) =

Australian politician (born 1948)

Member of the Tasmanian Legislative Council
- In office 28 August 1999 – 5 May 2001
- Preceded by: Peter McKay
- Succeeded by: Allison Ritchie
- Constituency: Pembroke

Mayor of Clarence
- In office 1989–2005
- Preceded by: Position established
- Succeeded by: Jock Campbell

Personal details
- Born: 4 September 1948 (age 78) Montreal, Quebec, Canada
- Party: Independent

Catherine Mary Edwards (born 4 September 1948) is an Australian former politician. She was an independent member of the Tasmanian Legislative Council from 1999 to 2001, representing the electoral division of Pembroke.

== Early life and education ==
Edwards was born in Montreal, Quebec, Canada. She obtained a Diploma of Physiotherapy in 1970 and later earned a Bachelor of Arts in 1983.

== Career ==
Edwards served as the first mayor of the City of Clarence from 1989 to 2005.

On 28 August 1999, she won election to the Tasmanian Legislative Council as an independent candidate representing the division of Pembroke. She served in parliament until 5 May 2001, when she was defeated by Labor candidate Allison Ritchie.

Tasmanian Legislative Council
Preceded by Peter McKay	Member for Pembroke; 1999–2001	Succeeded by Allison Ritchie
