= Luke Edmunds =

Australian politician (born 1981)

The Honourable Luke Edmunds MLC

Member of the Tasmanian Legislative Council for Pembroke
- Incumbent
- Assumed office 10 September 2022
- Preceded by: Jo Siejka
Shadow portfolios Since 2025
Willie Shadow Ministry
2025–	Shadow Minister for Finance
2025–	Shadow Minister for Stadium and Sport
2025–	Shadow Minister for Hospitality

Personal details
- Party: Labor (since 2006)
- Occupation: Journalist

Luke Matthew Edmunds (born 7 December 1981) is an Australian politician who was first elected to the Tasmanian Legislative Council as the Labor member for Pembroke at the 2022 Pembroke state by-election, replacing retiring incumbent Jo Siejka.

== Personal life ==
Edmunds rents a home with his wife and three children in Bellerive on Hobart's Eastern Shore. He was raised in Launceston, and worked as a journalist for all three of Tasmania's major newspapers: The Examiner, The Mercury and The Advocate, where he was Sports Editor. Edmunds attended Mowbray Primary School, Brooks High School and Newstead College, and studied arts at the University of Tasmania.

== Political career ==
A lifelong Labor supporter, Edmunds’ first memory of politics was watching the 1993 Australian Federal Election on television, where Prime Minister Paul Keating captured his attention, as retold in his first speech to Parliament. Edmunds first joined the Party in 2006.

Edmunds was elected to Clarence City Council at the 2018 Tasmanian Local Government Elections. “People are telling me they want Council focused on delivering the basics like good roads, getting our rubbish and recycling right, and investing in our green spaces,” he said during his campaign.

In 2022 Edmunds was endorsed by the Labor Party to run in the Pembroke state by-election. He delivered a strong victory, securing a 63.33% majority after distribution of preferences. As the Member for Pembroke Edmunds has praised health workers, fought for funding to support children with hearing loss, stood up for local councils against forced amalgamations – a policy later abandoned by the State Liberal Government, and launched a parliamentary inquiry into Tasmanian power prices.

Edmunds has announced he will recontest the seat of Pembroke at the 2025 periodic Legislative Council election, to be held on 24 May 2025.
