= Leonie Hiscutt =

Australian politician (born 1959)

Leader of the Government in the Tasmanian Legislative Council
- In office 30 March 2017 – 24 May 2025
- Premier: Will Hodgman; Peter Gutwein; Jeremy Rockliff
- Deputy: Jane Howlett; Jo Palmer
- Preceded by: Vanessa Goodwin
- Succeeded by: Tania Rattray

Member of the Tasmanian Legislative Council for Montgomery
- In office 6 May 2013 – 24 May 2025
- Preceded by: Sue Smith
- Succeeded by: Casey Hiscutt

Personal details
- Born: 14 January 1959 (age 67) Elliott, Tasmania, Australia
- Party: Liberal Party
- Children: Casey Hiscutt

Leonie Anne Hiscutt (born 14 January 1959) is an Australian politician, who was a member of the Tasmanian Legislative Council for the division of Montgomery between 2013 and 2025.

Hiscutt was a farmer and businesswoman prior to entering Parliament. She grew up in Elliott (near Yolla) and currently lives in Howth (near Penguin). Her husband's uncles, Des Hiscutt and Hugh Hiscutt were both previously members of the Tasmanian parliament.

Following the resignation of Vanessa Goodwin in 2017 for health reasons, Hiscutt was appointed as the Leader of the Government in the Tasmanian Legislative Council.

She did not contest the 2025 election, but her son, Casey Hiscutt, ran as an independent and won.

Tasmanian Legislative Council
Preceded by Sue Smith	Member for Montgomery; 2013–2025	Succeeded by Casey Hiscutt
