= Meg Webb =

Australian politician and community sector worker (born 1974)

The Honourable Meg Webb MLC

Member of the Tasmanian Legislative Council for Nelson
- Incumbent
- Assumed office 4 May 2019
- Preceded by: Jim Wilkinson

Personal details
- Born: 6 October 1974 (age 51) Queenstown, Tasmania, Australia
- Party: Independent

Megan Therese Webb (born 6 October 1974) is an Australian politician and community sector worker. At the periodic elections in May 2019, she was elected to the Tasmanian Legislative Council as the independent member for Nelson, replacing long-time MLC Jim Wilkinson, who retired after nearly 24 years on the council.

Prior to her election, Webb worked for Anglicare as manager of its Social Action and Research Centre. At the 2018 Tasmanian state election, she was part of a coalition which ran a campaign to remove poker machines in pubs and clubs by 2023.

Tasmanian Legislative Council
Preceded by Jim Wilkinson	Member for Nelson; 2019–present	Incumbent
