= Sue Smith (politician) =

Australian politician (born 1951)

Sue Smith AM

28th President of the Tasmanian Legislative Council
- In office 10 June 2008 – 4 May 2013
- Preceded by: Don Wing
- Succeeded by: Jim Wilkinson

Personal details
- Born: 24 January 1951 (age 75) Ulverstone, Tasmania, Australia
- Party: Independent
- Spouse: Wayne Smith divorced

Susan Lynette Smith AM (born 24 January 1951) is an Australian politician who was an independent member of the Tasmanian Legislative Council, representing the electoral division of Montgomery. She was first elected to the division of Leven in 1997 but the seat was abolished in 1999 and she transferred to the newly created seat of Montgomery. She was elected unopposed in 2007 and retired on 4 May 2013. From June 2008 to May 2013 she was President of the Legislative Council, the first woman to hold that office. Smith is divorced with a grown son and daughter.

Tasmanian Legislative Council
Preceded by Don Wing	President of the Tasmanian Legislative Council; 2008–2013	Succeeded by Jim Wilkinson
Division created	Member for Leven; 1997–1999	Division abolished
Division created	Member for Montgomery; 1999–2013	Succeeded by Leonie Hiscutt
