= Allison Ritchie =

Australian politician (born 1974)

Deputy Mayor of Clarence
- Incumbent
- Assumed office 1 November 2022
- Leader: Brendan Blomeley; Drew Jenner
- Preceded by: Heather Chong

Councillor of the City of Clarence
- Incumbent
- Assumed office 1 November 2022

Leader of the Tasmanian National Party
- In office 27 November 2013 – 26 November 2014
- Succeeded by: Steve Martin

Member of the Tasmanian Legislative Council for Pembroke
- In office 5 May 2001 – 20 June 2009
- Preceded by: Cathy Edwards
- Succeeded by: Vanessa Goodwin

Personal details
- Born: 28 July 1974 (age 52) Hobart, Tasmania, Australia
- Party: Independent
- Other political affiliations: National (2013-14); Labor (until 2011)
- Relations: Carol Brown (aunt)

Allison Maree Ritchie (born 28 July 1974) is an Australian politician who currently serves as Deputy Mayor of City of Clarence. From 2001 to 2009, she was a member of the Tasmanian Legislative Council representing the electorate of Pembroke.

== Early life ==
Ritchie grew up on Hobart's Eastern Shore and attended Mornington Primary School, Clarence High School, Rosny College and the University of Tasmania. Coming from an Australian political family (an aunt, Carol Brown, is a federal senator and a great uncle was a state president of the Australian Labor Party), Ritchie joined the Labor Party at age 14.

== Political career ==
On 5 May 2001, Ritchie was elected to the Tasmanian Legislative Council. Ritchie was the youngest person ever elected to the Legislative Council.

On 24 November 2001, Ritchie became the first MP to marry for the first time while in office with her marriage to husband, David Cowle. She also became the first woman to give birth while being a member of the Legislative Council with the birth of her son in December 2002.

In June 2009, Ritchie attracted controversy over the employment of family members in her office. A review by the Auditor-General found that no formal rules had been broken but that "the recommendation of her mother’s appointment, in the knowledge of a flawed assessment process, was not in accordance with the principles of openness and objectivity outlined in the Code of Conduct."

While a member of the Legislative Council, Ritchie held the position of Minister for Planning and Workplace Relations from 18 September 2008 to 24 November 2008. Ritchie stepped down as Minister due to ill health (understood to be the diagnosis of an autoimmune disease) on 24 November 2008 and resigned from Tasmanian Parliament entirely on 20 June 2009.

Having resigned from the ALP in 2011, in January 2013 Ritchie announced she would once again contest the upper house seat of Pembroke as an independent in the 2013 Tasmanian Legislative Council periodic election. However, following the election held on Saturday 4 May 2013, the seat was retained by the Liberal candidate and incumbent councillor Vanessa Goodwin.

In 2013, Ritchie was appointed State Director of the National Party, which had been re-registered in Tasmania.

At the 2022 Tasmanian local elections, Ritchie was elected Deputy Mayor of Clarence City Council, and was reelected in 2026.

Tasmanian Legislative Council
Preceded by Cathy Edwards	Member for Pembroke; 2001–2009	Succeeded by Vanessa Goodwin
