= Jim Wilkinson (Australian politician) =

Australian politician and sportsman (born 1951)

President of the Tasmanian Legislative Council
- In office 21 May 2013 – 3 May 2019
- Preceded by: Sue Smith
- Succeeded by: Craig Farrell

Member of the Tasmanian Legislative Council for Nelson
- In office 1 July 1999 – 3 May 2019
- Preceded by: Division created
- Succeeded by: Meg Webb

Member of the Tasmanian Legislative Council for Queenborough
- In office 27 May 1995 – 30 June 1999
- Preceded by: John Stopp
- Succeeded by: Division abolished

Personal details
- Born: James Scott Wilkinson; 4 December 1951 (age 74) Hobart, Tasmania, Australia

Jim Wilkinson
Personal information
- Height: 1.82 m (6 ft 0 in)
- Batting: Left-handed

Domestic team information
- Years: Team
- 1973–1977: Tasmania

Career statistics
Competition	First-class	List A
Matches	3	2
Runs scored	166	8
Batting average	33.20	4.00
100s/50s	0/1	0/0
Top score	79	8
Catches/stumpings	0/–	0/–
- Source: Cricinfo, 24 February 2012

James Scott Wilkinson (born 4 December 1951) is an Australian former politician and sportsman, who was an independent member of the Tasmanian Legislative Council, representing the Division of Queenborough from 1995, then the Division of Nelson from 1999 when Queenborough was abolished. He was President of the Tasmanian Legislative Council from 2013, until his retirement from the council in May 2019.

As a child, Wilkinson lived in Battery Point and later Sandy Bay where he attended Hutchins School. He moved to Melbourne to play for South Melbourne in the VFL between 1970 and 1972 and attended Melbourne High School in 1970.

After three years in Melbourne, he returned to Tasmania to study law, while also continuing with sport playing football and cricket for Sandy Bay.

As a result of his efforts he played first-class cricket for Tasmania from 1973 to 1975 as well as becoming the Australian junior and senior royal amateur tennis champion.

In 1977, he married his wife Jill and together they have four children and four grandchildren.

On completing his sporting career, he turned his focus to the ABC to commentate on both football and cricket. His commentating career in football lasted more than 15 years and expanded into a football program on 7HT on Saturday mornings with Noel Grey.

He later took a position with the Tasmanian Football Commission for a number of years, the last of which being the role of Chief Commissioner for Tasmania Australia National Football League. During this time he was also a member of the Tasmanian Cricket Association Board for many years and a representative on the Swimming Tasmania Board.

As well as his position on the Tasmanian Legislative Council he is also practising lawyer in Hobart, working as a consultant to Wallace Wilkinson & Webster, having been a partner of the firm prior to his appointment to the Legislative Council.

Tasmanian Legislative Council
Preceded by Sue Smith	President of the Tasmanian Legislative Council; 2013–2019	Succeeded by Craig Farrell
Preceded by John Stopp	Member for Queenborough; 1995–1999	Abolished
New seat	Member for Nelson; 1999–2019	Succeeded by Meg Webb
