= Vanessa Goodwin =

Australian politician

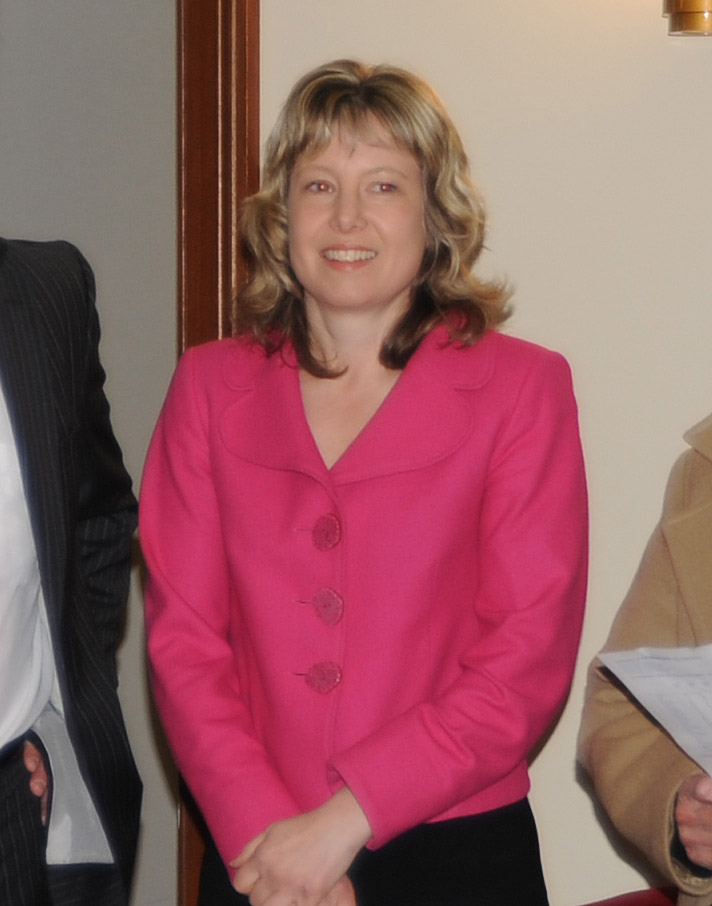

Member of the Tasmanian Legislative Council for Pembroke
- In office 1 August 2009 – 2 October 2017
- Preceded by: Allison Ritchie
- Succeeded by: Jo Siejka

Personal details
- Born: 22 April 1969 Hobart, Tasmania, Australia
- Died: 3 March 2018 (aged 48) Hobart, Tasmania, Australia
- Party: Liberal Party
- Education: University of Tasmania
- Profession: Lawyer, criminologist

Vanessa Goodwin (22 April 1969 – 3 March 2018) was an Australian politician. She was the Liberal Party member for the seat of Pembroke in the Tasmanian Legislative Council from the Pembroke by-election on 1 August 2009 until her resignation due to brain cancer on 2 October 2017.

== Early life ==
Goodwin was born in Hobart, Tasmania. She received a Bachelor of Arts and Bachelor of Laws from the University of Tasmania, a Master of Philosophy (Criminology) from the University of Cambridge, and a Doctor of Philosophy from the University of Tasmania.

== Career ==
Goodwin was a criminologist and lawyer who had worked for the Department of Police and Public Safety. She had previously worked as an Associate to the Chief Justice of the Supreme Court of Tasmania, as the Public Affairs Officer for the local Australian Hotels Association branch and as a research assistant for the Tasmanian Governor.

Goodwin unsuccessfully contested the state seat of Franklin at the 2006 Tasmanian election, and the federal seat of Franklin at the 2007 federal election.

In 2009, Tasmanian Legislative Council member for Pembroke, Allison Ritchie, resigned, causing a by-election. Goodwin stood as the Liberal candidate, and won by a large margin. She was re-elected in 2013.

After the 2014 Tasmanian election, Goodwin was appointed Attorney-General, Minister for Justice, Minister for Corrections and Minister for the Arts, as well as Leader for the Government in the Legislative Council.

Goodwin resigned on 2 October 2017 for health reasons. Her seat was filled in a by-election, which was won by Labor's Jo Siejka.

== Health and death ==
On 25 March 2017, Goodwin was hospitalised with multiple brain tumours. On 6 April, Premier Will Hodgman informed the parliament that she was not expected to recover.

She died from brain cancer on 3 March 2018, aged 48, on the day of the 2018 Tasmanian state election.

Tasmanian Legislative Council
Preceded by Allison Ritchie	Member for Pembroke; 2009–2017	Succeeded by Jo Siejka
Political offices
Preceded by Brian Wightman	Attorney-General of Tasmania; 2014–2017	Succeeded by Will Hodgman
Preceded by Brian Wightman	Minister for Justice; 2014–2017	Succeeded by Elise Archer
Preceded by Lara Giddings	Minister for the Arts; 2014–2017	Succeeded by Elise Archer
Preceded by Craig Farrell	Minister for Corrections; 2014–2017	Succeeded by Elise Archer
