= Electoral division of Montgomery =

Tasmanian Legislative Council electoral division

Montgomery Tasmania—Legislative Council
- Map showing the electoral division of Montgomery, as of the 2017 periodic review.
- State: Tasmania
- Created: 1999
- MP: Casey Hiscutt
- Party: Independent
- Electors: 27,913 (2019)
- Area: 2,457 km^{2} (948.7 sq mi)
- Demographic: Provincial
- Federal electorate(s): Braddon; Lyons
- Coordinates: 41.339°S 146.02°E
Electorates around Montgomery:
Murchison	Bass Strait	Bass Strait
Murchison	Montgomery	Mersey; McIntyre
Murchison	McIntyre	McIntyre

The electoral division of Montgomery is one of the fifteen electorates in the Tasmanian Legislative Council.

It is centred on the Central Coast area and includes the localities of; Ulverstone, Penguin, Heybridge, Hampshire and West Pine.

The electorate also includes most of the City of Burnie. Acton, Hillcrest, Montello, Brooklyn, Romaine, South Burnie and Upper Burnie are part of this electoral division. However Somerset, Parklands, Park grove and Shorewell are located in the Electoral division of Murchison. The division shares its western borders with the Burnie Municipal Council.

As of May 2019, Montgomery had 27,913 enrolled voters and covers an area of 2,457 km². The electorate is represented by independent Casey Hiscutt, who was elected on 24 May 2025.

== Members ==
Member	Party	Period
Sue Smith	Independent	1999–2013
Leonie Hiscutt	Liberal	2013–2025
Casey Hiscutt	Independent	2025–present

== Election results ==
2025 Tasmanian Legislative Council periodic elections: Montgomery
Party	Candidate	Votes	%	±%
Independent	Casey Hiscutt	7,546	32.00	+32.00
Liberal	Stephen Parry	6,895	29.24	−15.15
Greens	Darren Briggs	5,101	21.63	+21.63
Shooters, Fishers, Farmers	Adrian Pickin	3,038	12.88	+2.07
Independent	Gatty Burnett	1,002	4.25	+4.25
Total formal votes		23,582	96.31	+0.09
Informal votes		903	3.69	−0.09
Turnout		24,485	82.10	−2.16
Two-party-preferred result
Independent	Casey Hiscutt	14,449	61.70	+61.70
Liberal	Stephen Parry	8,968	38.30	−21.87
Independent gain from Liberal				

== See also ==
- Tasmanian House of Assembly
