= Electoral division of Nelson (Tasmania) =

Tasmanian Legislative Council electoral division

Nelson Tasmania—Legislative Council
- Map showing the electoral division of Nelson, as of the 2017 periodic review.
- State: Tasmania
- Created: 1999
- MP: Meg Webb
- Party: Independent
- Electors: 24,086 (2019)
- Area: 75 km^{2} (29.0 sq mi)
- Demographic: Outer-metropolitan
- Federal electorate(s): Clark; Franklin
- Coordinates: 42.954°S 147.295°E
Electorates around Nelson:
Huon	Hobart	River Derwent
Huon	Nelson	River Derwent
Huon	Huon	River Derwent

The electoral division of Nelson is a constituency of the Tasmanian Legislative Council. The division includes many of the suburbs to the south of Hobart, including South Hobart, Sandy Bay, Taroona and Kingston. The division was created in 1999 when the electoral division of Queenborough was renamed in a review of electoral boundaries. The member from 1999 until his retirement in 2019 was independent Jim Wilkinson.

The most recent election was in May 2025, when independent incumbent Meg Webb was re-elected.

== Members ==
Member	Party	Period
Jim Wilkinson	Independent	1999–2019
Meg Webb	Independent	2019–present

== Election results ==
2025 Tasmanian Legislative Council periodic election: Nelson
Party	Candidate	Votes	%	±%
Independent	Meg Webb	10,619	51.70	+37.89
Liberal	Marcus Vermey	7,031	34.23	+10.54
Greens	Nathan Volf	2,889	14.07	+2.93
Total formal votes		20,539	98.12	+0.88
Informal votes		394	1.88	−0.88
Turnout		20,933	81.90	−0.41
Independent hold				
