= Electoral division of Pembroke =

Tasmanian Legislative Council electoral division

Pembroke Tasmania—Legislative Council
- Map showing the electoral division of Pembroke, as of the 2017 periodic review.
- State: Tasmania
- Created: 1856
- MP: Luke Edmunds
- Party: Labor
- Namesake: Pembroke Land District
- Electors: 22,876 (2019)
- Area: 32 km^{2} (12.4 sq mi)
- Demographic: Outer-metropolitan
- Federal electorate: Franklin
- Coordinates: 42.865°S 147.386°E
Electorates around Pembroke:
Rumney	Rumney	Rumney
River Derwent	Pembroke	Rumney
River Derwent	River Derwent	River Derwent

The electoral division of Pembroke is one of the 15 electorates or 'seats' in the Tasmanian Legislative Council or upper house. It is located on Hobart's Eastern Shore (east side of the River Derwent) and includes a number of suburbs; Risdon Vale, Geilston Bay, Rose Bay, Lindisfarne, Warrane, Mornington, Bellerive, Howrah and Tranmere. In earlier times, the division included most of the east coast of Tasmania as far north as Bicheno, including the Tasman Peninsula.

The electorate takes its name from a county which was created in Tasmania by early British settlers. The division and the former county both took their name from Pembrokeshire in Wales.

== Members ==
Member	Party	Period
James Whyte	Independent	1856–1876
James Lord	Independent	1876–1881
William Hodgson	Independent	1881–1891
Henry Lamb	Independent	1891–1899
William Perkins	Independent	1899–1903
James Murdoch Sr.	Independent	1903–1925
James Murdoch Jr.	Independent	1925–1935
John Murdoch	Independent	1935–1936
Archibald Blacklow	Independent	1936–1953
William Dunbabin	Independent	1953–1959
Ben McKay	Independent	1959–1976
Peter McKay	Independent	1976–1991
Peter McKay	Liberal	1991–1999
Cathy Edwards	Independent	1999–2001
Allison Ritchie	Labor	2001–2009
Vanessa Goodwin	Liberal	2009–2017
Jo Siejka	Labor	2017–2022
Luke Edmunds	Labor	2022–present

== Election results ==
2025 Tasmanian Legislative Council periodic election: Pembroke
Party	Candidate	Votes	%	±%
Labor	Luke Edmunds	8,449	43.73	+4.25
Independent	Allison Ritchie	4,049	20.96	+20.96
Greens	Carly Allen	3,995	20.68	+1.41
Independent	Tony Mulder	2,009	10.40	+10.40
Shooters, Fishers, Farmers	Steve Loring	820	4.24	+1.08
Total formal votes		19,322	97.73	+0.79
Informal votes		449	2.27	−0.79
Turnout		19,771	84.07	+3.83
Two-candidate-preferred result
Labor	Luke Edmunds	11,217	58.18	−5.08
Independent	Allison Ritchie	8,062	41.82	+41.82
Labor hold				

Swings are calculated from the 2022 by-election.

== See also ==
- Pembroke Land District
- Tasmanian House of Assembly
