= Tasmanian Legislative Council =

Upper house of the Parliament of Tasmania

Legislative Council
- 51st Parliament

Type
- Type: Upper house of the Parliament of Tasmania

History
- Founded: 1825; 201 years ago

Leadership
- President: Craig Farrell, Labor since 21 May 2019
- Deputy President and Chair of Committees: Ruth Forrest, Independent since 10 May 2008
- Leader of the Government: Tania Rattray, Independent since 8 August 2025
- Leader of Opposition Business: Sarah Lovell, Labor

Structure
- Seats: 15
- Political groups: Government (4): Liberal (3) (Note: Nick Duigan (Windermere), Kerry Vincent (Prosser), Jo Palmer (Rosevears)); Independent (1); Opposition (3): Labor (3) (Note: Craig Farrell (Derwent), Luke Edmunds (Pembroke), Sarah Lovell (Rumney)); Crossbench (8): Greens (1); Independent (7) (Note: Rosemary Armitage (Launceston), Ruth Forrest (Murchison), Mike Gaffney (Mersey), Dean Harriss (Huon), Casey Hiscutt (Montgomery), Bec Thomas (Elwick), Meg Webb (Nelson))
- Length of term: 6 years

Elections
- Last election: 2 May 2026 (periodic)
- Next election: 2027

Meeting place
- Legislative Council Chamber, Parliament House, Hobart, Tasmania, Australia

Website
- Tas Legislative Council

The Tasmanian Legislative Council is the upper house of the Parliament of Tasmania in Australia. It is one of the two chambers of the Parliament, the other being the House of Assembly. Both houses sit in Parliament House in the state capital, Hobart. Members of the Legislative Council are often referred to as MLCs.

The Legislative Council has 15 members elected using preferential voting in 15 single-member electorates. Each electorate has approximately the same number of electors. A review of Legislative Council division boundaries is required every 9 years; the most recent was completed in 2017. Election of members in the Legislative Council are staggered. Elections alternate between three divisions in one year and in two divisions the next year. Elections take place on the first Saturday in May. The term of each MLC is six years.

Tasmanian's upper house is unique in Australian politics, in that historically it is the only chamber in any state parliament to be significantly non-partisan. As of 2024, the chamber had a plurality of independents, although it has previously had an outright independent majority. Following the 2025 periodic elections, the Council returned to being majority Independent after the election of Casey Hiscutt in Montgomery.

Unlike other Australian state parliaments, the Legislative Council is elected from single-member districts, while the Tasmanian House of Assembly is elected from multi-member districts. The reverse is the case in most of the rest of Australia; that is, the lower house is elected from single-member districts while the upper house is elected from multi-member districts.

== Overview ==
The Council has the power to block supply and force a government to election but cannot itself be dissolved early, because there is nothing in the Tasmanian constitution to allow that. The constitution can only be altered by a vote in each house of parliament, so the Council's rights cannot be reduced, and it cannot be abolished, without its agreement.

The Tasmanian Legislative Council has never been controlled by a single political party, with voters in Tasmania tending to elect independents over candidates endorsed by political parties. The Labor Party endorses candidates in some Legislative Council elections, and is the most successful political party in the Council's history, having had a total of 20 members elected. The Liberal Party has maintained the view that the Legislative Council should not be a "party house", and has rarely endorsed candidates who have gone on to win a seat. However, the party has often tacitly backed independent conservatives, many of whom had previously been Liberal candidates or members at state or federal level.

A former Liberal member of the Council, Peter McKay, was first elected as an independent in 1976 but became a Liberal in 1991. Since 2009, the Liberal Party has endorsed candidates more frequently, but it has only ever had a maximum of 4 endorsed members elected to the Legislative Council. At the 2009 Pembroke by-election, the endorsed Liberal candidate, Vanessa Goodwin, won the seat. The Tasmanian Greens endorse candidates in Legislative Council elections and won the seat of Hobart at the 2024 Tasmanian Legislative Council periodic election, their first and only Legislative Council success.

Candidates for Legislative Council elections are required by law to restrict their expenditure to a specified limit ($10,000 in 2005; increasing by $500 per year). In addition, no other person or political party may spend money to promote a specific candidate. This requirement is almost unique in Australia. Other than at elections for the Australian Capital Territory Legislative Assembly, no other jurisdiction imposes expenditure limits on candidates.

== History ==
The New South Wales Act 1823 (4 Geo. 4. c. 96 (Imp)), passed by the British Parliament, separated Van Diemen's Land from New South Wales, making it a penal colony under the British Crown and Privy Council. The Van Diemen's Land Legislative Council was created in 1825 as an advisory body to the Lieutenant-Governor of Van Diemen's Land. The Legislative Council consisted of six members chosen by the Lieutenant-Governor, who continued to report to the Governor of New South Wales. The Australian Courts Act 1828 (9 Geo. 4. c. 83 (Imp)) enabled its expansion to 15 members, with the Lieutenant-Governor as Presiding Officer.

The council remained fully nominative until the Australian Constitutions Act 1850 (13 & 14 Vict. c. 59 (Imp)) came into effect in Van Diemen's Land on 21 October 1851, when the council was expanded to 24 members, with 16 elected by the voters and eight nominated by the governor, who ceased to be a member. The franchise for these elections was extremely limited, with only men over 30 and who owned a certain amount of property eligible to vote. Former convicts, who made up a significant proportion of the colony's population, were not able to vote. The 1851 arrangements were a compromise struck by the governor between the colonists' demands for representative government and the Colonial Office's wish to control the colony through the governor. The first speaker of the new council was Sir Richard Dry.

On 24 October 1856, an act was proclaimed permitting the introduction of a bicameral, representative parliament with the creation of the Tasmanian House of Assembly, where the power of the executive government resided, and the abolition of nominee positions on the council. The speaker's position was renamed President. A distinctive feature of the act is that it did not enable the governor to dissolve the Legislative Council.

Like other democratic upper houses of that period, it was established using single-member electorates elected using the first-past-the-post system, with Hobart and Launceston being multi-member electorates. Voters would simply cross off the names of those whom they did not wish to vote for. Members were elected for a six-year term, and terms were staggered in such a way that two or three members' terms expired each year and elections were held in the first week of May. In the event of resignation or death of a member during their term, a by-election would be held to complete their term.

Reforms in 1907 saw the House of Assembly switch to using the Hare-Clark system with multi-member seats, and introduced preferential voting to the Council. A redistribution in 1946 broke up Hobart and Launceston into single-member electorates.

Suffrage was gradually expanded from the late 19th century onwards, with the property franchise being first eased and then abolished; ex-convicts, ex-servicemen and then women being granted the vote; the age of majority being reduced; and finally, full adult suffrage in 1968. The first woman to sit on the Legislative Council was Margaret McIntyre in 1948; the first woman to chair the upper house was Phyllis Benjamin in 1956.

In the 1990s, various Tasmanian governments attempted to cut the size of parliament. Various reports proposed reducing the Tasmanian Legislative Council from 19 seats to 15. Others including the Morling Report proposed abolishing the Council and merging some of the electorates into the Tasmanian House of Assembly. However the council would not agree to any of these proposals. During Tony Rundle's government the Legislative Council finally allowed passage of the Parliamentary Reform Bill 1998, reducing the number of seats in the chamber from 19 to 15, and redistributing all seats through an independent Distribution Tribunal, abolishing a previous rural bias which had led to unequal seats. However, the seats were not named after their geographic location, often using land district or county names unfamiliar to most residents, so considerable confusion for voters ensued in determining which seat they were located in.

At the 2024 Tasmanian Legislative Council periodic election, Cassy O'Connor became the first Tasmanian Greens member of the Tasmanian Legislative Council.

== Electorates ==
Map of the 15 Tasmanian Legislative Council electorates

The 15 single-member electoral divisions of the Tasmanian Legislative Council are:

- Derwent
- Elwick
- Hobart
- Huon
- Launceston
- McIntyre
- Mersey
- Montgomery
- Murchison
- Nelson
- Pembroke
- Prosser
- Rosevears
- Rumney
- Windermere

=== Periodic review ===
A review of Legislative Council division boundaries is required every 9 years to maintain a population variation of less than 10% between the divisions. This ensures that each member of the Legislative Council represents approximately the same number of electors. Redistribution reviews also take into account the community interest of each division.

The most recent redistribution was completed in 2017 which saw the electorates of Apsley and Western Tiers abolished, and the establishment of the McIntyre and Prosser electorates.

== Members ==
=== Current distribution of seats ===
The current distribution of seats (updated post 2026 Tasmanian Legislative Council periodic elections) is:

Party	Seats held	Percentage	Seat distribution
Independents	8	53.3%	
Liberal Party	3	20.0%	
Labor Party	3	20.0%	
Greens	1	6.7%	

== Positions ==
=== Presiding Officer ===
When the Legislative Council of Van Diemen's Land was created in 1825 it was a fully nominated body with the Lieutenant-Governor as Presiding Officer. Between 1850 and 1856 the Presiding Officer in the Legislative Council was known as the Speaker. Sir Richard Dry was the first elected to hold this position. As part of wider parliamentary changes the title was changed in 1856 to President.

The current President of the Legislative Council is Derwent MLC Craig Farrell.

== Committees ==
=== Public Accounts Committee ===
The Public Accounts committee is a Joint Committee, meaning that it is composed of members from both houses of parliament. Currently, there are three Legislative Councilors and three Members of the House of Assembly on this committee. This composition is unique in Australia where most Public Accounts Committees are dominated by lower house members. This committee is commonly referred to as the most powerful committee in an Australian Parliament. It has the power to look into any issue pertaining to the financials of the State, including government agencies, to ensure that money is going where it is intended. The committee can establish its own inquiries, without parliamentary authorisation.

The Committee is currently chaired by Independent member for Murchison, Ruth Forrest.

=== Subordinate Legislation Committee ===
One of the common functions of Australian upper houses is to scrutinise subordinate legislation. Subordinate legislation is necessary because the executive needs a means of creating rules more detailed than can be in legislation. The Subordinate Legislation Committee is established by statute in Subordinate Legislation Committee Act 1969. This is also a joint committee, composed of three members from each house. The Subordinate Legislation Committee examines every regulation made by the executive. If the committee is of the view that the regulation does not comply with the Act under which it was made, it can refer the regulation to the parliament. Either the House of Assemble or the Legislative Council can pass a resolution that disallows the regulation. This disallowance is not retrospective and will not affect the actions taken while the regulation was in effect. If neither House is sitting, then the Committee can force the authority which made the regulation to; amend the regulation to make it consistent with a model suggested by the Committee, rescind the regulation completely, or suspend the regulation until both Houses of Parliament have dealt with the report of the Committee. The Subordinate Legislation Committee is not intended to examine the political effect of the regulation, rather they simply examine whether the regulation is clear, conforms with the Act under which it was made, and does not impinge on judicial jurisdiction.

=== Public Works Committee ===
The Public Works committee is created under the Public Works Committee Act 1914 and is composed of four members, two from the HoA and two from the LC. The function of the Public Works Committee is to examine any proposed public work in Tasmania that will cost more than $5,000,000. The work cannot commence until the committee has passed it. The PWC examines the public value of the work, the necessity of the work, and whether it will produce revenue as expected.

If the Committee decides that it does not meet these standards, then it has the power to prevent work going ahead. The Committee can also suggest changes to a project.

In 2015, the Committee examined the proposal to replace the St Pauls River Bridge outside Avoca. The committee recommended that the new bridge was built but suggested that the old bridge be retained for pedestrian access bridge.

=== Sessional Committees ===
There are two Legislative Council Sessional Committees, Government Administration A and Government Administration B with half the MLCs on one Committee and half on the other. These are composed entirely of Legislative Councilors. Sessional Committees are always sitting and can examine any issue relating to the Ministry for which they are responsible, or any bill referred to it by the Legislative Council.

An example of a Sessional Committee is the 'Legislative Council Sessional Committee Government Administration A: Sub-Committee Fin Fish Farming in Tasmania' which held its first hearing on 11 February 2020. This Sessional Committee terms of reference indicate it was established to examine the implementation of the Sustainable Industry Growth Plan for the Salmon Industry in Tasmania.

=== Select Committees ===
Select Committees are established to conduct an inquiry on one specific issue and then normally cease to exist once they have tabled their final report. The Standing Orders of the LC governs these Committees and the LC can confer powers to examine witnesses or issue summons upon the committee. Select Committees can be either Joint Committees or single house committees.

Estimates Committee is considered to be a select committee. The Estimates committees are established by the Legislative Council Standing Orders as a way to ‘examine and report’ on the proposed expenditure in an appropriation (money) bill. It allows the executive to be scrutinised as Independent MLCs can gather facts, consult with the public and hold the executive accountable for the actions they are taking in their budgets. This is especially important as the LC cannot amend money bills.

== See also ==
- Members of the Tasmanian Legislative Council from 1879
- Parliaments of the Australian states and territories
