= Members of the Tasmanian Legislative Council, 1915–1921 =

This is a list of members of the Tasmanian Legislative Council between 1915 and 1921. Terms of the Legislative Council did not coincide with Legislative Assembly elections, and members served six year terms, with a number of members facing election each year.

== Elections ==
Date	Electorates
4 May 1915	Cambridge; Hobart (1); Russell
2 May 1916	Hobart (1); Launceston (1); Gordon
8 May 1917	Hobart (1); Meander; Pembroke
7 May 1918	Huon; Launceston (1); Mersey
6 May 1919	Derwent; Tamar; Westmorland
4 May 1920	Buckingham; Macquarie; South Esk

== Members ==
Name	Division	Years in office	Elected
Hon Stafford Bird	Huon	1909–1924	1918
Hon Frank Bond	Hobart	1909–1921	1915
Hon John Cheek^{[1]}	Westmorland	1907–1913; 1919–1942	1907
Hon George Collins	Tamar	1895–1919	1913
Hon Charles Davies	Cambridge	1897–1921	1915
Hon Ellis Dean^{[3]}	Derwent	1901–1920	1919
Hon Ernest Freeland	Tamar	1919–1937	1919
Hon Tetley Gant	Buckingham	1901–1927	1920
Hon Charles Hall	Russell	1909–1921	1915
Hon Frank Hart	Launceston	1916–1940	1916
Hon John Hope	Meander	1911–1926	1917
Hon Arthur Loone^{[2]}	South Esk	1910–1919; 1920	1914
Hon Peter McCrackan	Launceston	1904–1916	1910
Hon James McDonald (Labor)	Gordon	1916–1922; 1928–1947	1916
Hon Richard McKenzie^{[1]}	Westmorland	1913–1919	1919
Hon Arthur Morrisby	Gordon	1899–1916	1910
Hon James Murdoch (senior)	Pembroke	1903–1925	1917
Hon Thomas Murdoch	Hobart	1914–1916; 1921–1944	b/e
Hon Hubert Nichols	Mersey	1902–1924; 1926–1935	1918
Hon George Pitt	Macquarie	1920–1932	1920
Hon William Propsting	Hobart	1905–1937	1917
Hon Tasman Shields	Launceston	1915–1936	1918
Hon Louis Shoobridge (senior)^{[3]}	Derwent	1921–1937	b/e
Hon Alan Wardlaw	South Esk	1920–1938	1920
Hon William Williams	Hobart	1916–1922	1916
Hon Alfred Youl	Macquarie	1909–1920	1914

== Notes ==
^{1} On 13 October 1919, Richard McKenzie, the member for Westmorland, died. John Cheek was elected unopposed on 15 November 1919.
^{2} On 30 October 1920, Arthur Loone, the member for South Esk, resigned to contest a seat in the Australian Senate under the Nationalist banner. He was unsuccessful, and was re-elected unopposed to his Council seat.
^{3} On 8 November 1920, Ellis Dean, the member for Derwent, died. Louis Shoobridge (senior) won the resulting by-election on 3 February 1921.

== Sources ==
- Hughes, Colin A.; Aitkin, Don (1986). Voting for the Australian State Upper Houses, 1890-1984. Canberra: Australian National University. ISBN 0-9097-7918-X.
- Parliament of Tasmania (2006). The Parliament of Tasmania from 1856
