= Members of the Tasmanian Legislative Council, 1921–1927 =

This is a list of members of the Tasmanian Legislative Council between 1921 and 1927. Terms of the Legislative Council did not coincide with Legislative Assembly elections, and members served six year terms, with a number of members facing election each year.

== Elections ==
Date	Electorates
3 May 1921	Cambridge; Hobart (1), Russell
2 May 1922	Hobart (1); Launceston (1); Gordon
8 May 1923	Hobart (1); Meander; Pembroke
6 May 1924	Huon; Launceston (1); Mersey
5 May 1925	Derwent; Tamar; Westmorland
4 May 1926	Buckingham; Macquarie; South Esk

== Members ==
Name	Division	Years in office	Elected
Hon Stafford Bird	Huon	1909–1924	1918
Hon David Calvert^{[1]}	Huon	1924	1924
Hon William Calvert^{[1]}	Huon	1924–1942	b/e
Hon James Chapman^{[2]}	Hobart	1922–1925	1922
Hon John Cheek	Westmorland	1907–1913; 1919–1942	1925
Hon Joe Darling	Cambridge	1921–1946	1921
Hon Charles Eady^{[2]}	Hobart	1925–1945	b/e
Hon Frank Edwards	Russell	1921–1933	1921
Hon Ernest Freeland	Tamar	1919–1937	1925
Hon Tetley Gant	Buckingham	1901–1927	1926
Hon Frank Hart	Launceston	1916–1940	1922
Hon John Hope^{[4]}	Meander	1911–1926	1923
Hon Andrew Lawson	Gordon	1922–1928	1922
Hon Alexander Lillico	Mersey	1924–1954	1924
Hon James McDonald (Labor)	Gordon	1916–1922; 1928–1947	1916
Hon James Murdoch (senior)^{[3]}	Pembroke	1903–1925	1923
Hon James Murdoch (junior)^{[3]}	Pembroke	1925–1935	b/e
Hon Thomas Murdoch	Hobart	1914–1916; 1921–1944	1921
Hon Hubert Nichols^{[4]}	Mersey; Meander	1902–1924; 1926–1935	1918
Hon George Pitt	Macquarie	1920–1932	1926
Hon William Propsting	Hobart	1905–1937	1923
Hon Tasman Shields	Launceston	1915–1936	1924
Hon Louis Shoobridge (senior)	Derwent	1921–1937	1925
Hon Alan Wardlaw	South Esk	1920–1938	1926
Hon William Williams	Hobart	1916–1922	1916

== Notes ==
^{1} On 17 October 1924, David Calvert, the member for Huon, died five months into his term. His brother William Calvert won the resulting by-election on 2 December 1924.
^{2} On 12 April 1925, James Chapman, one of the three members for Hobart, died. Charles Eady won the resulting by-election on 23 June 1925.
^{3} On 29 May 1925, James Murdoch (senior), the member for Pembroke died. His son James Murdoch (junior) won the resulting by-election on 28 July 1925.
^{4} On 12 May 1926, John Hope, the member for Meander, died. Hubert Nichols won the resulting by-election on 20 July 1926.

== Sources ==
- Hughes, Colin A.; Aitkin, Don (1986). Voting for the Australian State Upper Houses, 1890-1984. Canberra: Australian National University. ISBN 0-9097-7918-X.
- Parliament of Tasmania (2006). The Parliament of Tasmania from 1856
