= Members of the Tasmanian Legislative Council, 1933–1939 =

This is a list of members of the Tasmanian Legislative Council between 1933 and 1939. Terms of the Legislative Council did not coincide with Legislative Assembly elections, and members served six year terms, with a number of members facing election each year.

== Elections ==
Date	Electorates
2 May 1933	Cambridge; Hobart (1); Russell
8 May 1934	Hobart (1); Launceston (1); Gordon
7 May 1935	Hobart (1); Meander; Pembroke
5 May 1936	Huon; Launceston (1); Mersey
4 May 1937	Derwent; Tamar; Westmorland
3 May 1938	Buckingham; Macquarie; South Esk

== Members ==
Name	Division	Years in office	Elected
Hon Albert Bendall	Macquarie	1932–1944	1938
Hon Percy Best	Meander	1935–1943	1935
Hon Archibald Blacklow^{[1]}	Pembroke	1936–1953	b/e
Hon William Calvert	Huon	1924–1942	1936
Hon John Cheek	Westmorland	1907–1913; 1919–1942	1937
Hon Arthur Cutts	Tamar	1937–1955	1937
Hon Joe Darling	Cambridge	1921–1946	1933
Hon Charles Eady	Hobart	1925–1945	1934
Hon Alexander Evans	Launceston	1936–1942	1936
Hon Arthur Fenton	Russell	1933–1957	1933
Hon Ernest Freeland	Tamar	1919–1937	1931
Hon Dr John Gaha (Labor)	Hobart	1933–1943	1933
Hon Frank Hart	Launceston	1916–1940	1934
Hon Alexander Lillico	Mersey	1924–1954	1936
Hon James McDonald (Labor)	Gordon	1916–1922; 1928–1947	1934
Hon James Murdoch (junior)^{[1]}	Pembroke	1925–1935	1935
Hon John Murdoch^{[1]}	Pembroke	1935–1936	b/e
Hon Thomas Murdoch	Buckingham	1914–1916; 1921–1944	1938
Hon Hubert Nichols	Meander	1902–1924; 1926–1935	1929
Hon Leslie Procter^{[3]}	South Esk	1939–1962	b/e
Hon William Propsting^{[2]}	Hobart	1905–1937	1935
Hon Tasman Shields	Launceston	1915–1936	1930
Hon Louis Shoobridge (senior)	Derwent	1921–1937	1931
Hon Rupert Shoobridge	Derwent	1937–1955	1937
Hon William Strutt^{[2]}	Hobart	1938–1948	b/e
Hon Alan Wardlaw^{[3]}	South Esk	1920–1938	1938

== Notes ==
^{1} On 27 October 1935, James Murdoch, the member for Pembroke, died. His brother John Murdoch won the resulting by-election on 17 December 1935. However, John Murdoch also died on 17 August 1936, and on 3 October 1936, Archibald Blacklow was elected to replace him.
^{2} On 3 December 1937, William Propsting, one of the three members for Hobart and the President of the Council, died. William Strutt won the resulting by-election on 15 February 1938.
^{3} On 24 December 1938, Alan Wardlaw, the member for South Esk, died. Leslie Procter won the resulting by-election on 7 March 1939.

== Sources ==
- Hughes, Colin A.; Aitkin, Don (1986). Voting for the Australian State Upper Houses, 1890-1984. Canberra: Australian National University. ISBN 0-9097-7918-X.
- Parliament of Tasmania (2006). The Parliament of Tasmania from 1856
