= Members of the Tasmanian Legislative Council, 1909–1915 =

This is a list of members of the Tasmanian Legislative Council between 1909 and 1915. Terms of the Legislative Council did not coincide with Legislative Assembly elections, and members served six year terms, with a number of members facing election each year.

== Elections ==
Date	Electorates
4 May 1909	Buckingham; Cambridge; Macquarie; Hobart (1); Russell; South Esk
3 May 1910	Hobart (1); Launceston (1); Gordon
2 May 1911	Hobart (1); Meander; Pembroke
7 May 1912	Huon; Launceston (1); Mersey
6 May 1913	Derwent; Tamar; Westmorland
5 May 1914	Buckingham; Macquarie; South Esk

== Members ==
Name	Division	Years in office	Elected
Hon Stafford Bird^{[1]}	Huon	1909–1924	1912
Hon Frank Bond	Hobart	1909–1921	1909
Hon Dr Gamaliel Butler^{[3]}	Hobart	1896–1914	1910
Hon John Cheek	Westmorland	1907–1913; 1919–1942	1907
Hon George Collins	Tamar	1895–1919	1913
Hon Charles Davies	Cambridge	1897–1921	1909
Hon Ellis Dean	Derwent	1901–1920	1913
Hon Thomas Fisher^{[1]}	Huon	1905–1909	1906
Hon Tetley Gant	Buckingham	1901–1927	1909, 1914
Hon Frederick Grubb	Meander	1879–1911	1905
Hon Charles Hall	Russell	1909–1921	1909
Hon John Hope	Meander	1911–1926	1911
Hon Arthur Loone^{[2]}	South Esk	1910–1919; 1920	1914
Hon Peter McCrackan	Launceston	1904–1916	1910
Hon Richard McKenzie	Westmorland	1913–1919	1913
Hon Arthur Morrisby	Gordon	1899–1916	1910
Hon James Murdoch (senior)	Pembroke	1903–1925	1911
Hon Thomas Murdoch^{[3]}	Hobart	1914–1916; 1921–1944	b/e
Hon Hubert Nichols^{[4]}	Mersey	1902–1924; 1926–1935	1912
Hon Christopher O'Reilly^{[2]}	South Esk	1909–1910	1909
Hon William Propsting	Hobart	1905–1937	1911
Hon Charles Russen^{[5]}	Launceston	1904–1914	1912
Hon Tasman Shields^{[5]}	Launceston	1915–1936	b/e
Hon Alfred Youl	Macquarie	1909–1920	1909, 1914

== Notes ==
^{1} On 15 February 1909, Thomas Fisher, the member for Huon, died. Stafford Bird won the resulting by-election on 4 May 1909.
^{2} On 11 January 1910, Christopher O'Reilly, the member for South Esk, died. Arthur Loone won the resulting by-election on 3 May 1910.
^{3} On 15 July 1914, Dr Gamaliel Butler, one of the three members for Hobart, died. Thomas Murdoch won the resulting by-election on 18 August 1914.
^{4} In October 1914, Hubert Nichols, the member for Mersey, resigned. He was re-elected at the resulting by-election on 7 November 1914.
^{5} On 11 December 1914, Charles Russen, one of the two members for Launceston, died. Tasman Shields won the resulting by-election on 22 January 1915.

== Sources ==
- Hughes, Colin A.; Aitkin, Don (1986). Voting for the Australian State Upper Houses, 1890-1984. Canberra: Australian National University. ISBN 0-9097-7918-X.
- Parliament of Tasmania (2006). The Parliament of Tasmania from 1856
