= Members of the Tasmanian Legislative Council, 1927–1933 =

This is a list of members of the Tasmanian Legislative Council between 1927 and 1933. Terms of the Legislative Council did not coincide with Legislative Assembly elections, and members served six year terms, with a number of members facing election each year.

== Elections ==
Date	Electorates
3 May 1927	Cambridge; Hobart (1); Russell
2 May 1928	Hobart (1); Launceston (1); Gordon
7 May 1929	Hobart (1); Meander; Pembroke
6 May 1930	Huon; Launceston (1); Mersey
5 May 1931	Derwent; Tamar; Westmorland
3 May 1932	Buckingham; Macquarie; South Esk

== Members ==
Name	Division	Years in office	Elected
Hon Albert Bendall	Macquarie	1932–1944	1932
Hon William Calvert	Huon	1924–1942	1930
Hon John Cheek	Westmorland	1907–1913; 1919–1942	1931
Hon Joe Darling	Cambridge	1921–1946	1927
Hon Charles Eady	Hobart	1925–1945	1928
Hon Frank Edwards	Russell	1921–1933	1927
Hon Ernest Freeland	Tamar	1919–1937	1931
Hon Tetley Gant^{[1]}	Buckingham	1901–1927	1926
Hon Frank Hart	Launceston	1916–1940	1928
Hon Andrew Lawson	Gordon	1922–1928	1922
Hon Alexander Lillico	Mersey	1924–1954	1930
Hon James McDonald (Labor)	Gordon	1916–1922; 1928–1947	1928
Hon James McKenzie	Hobart	1927–1933	1927
Hon James Murdoch (junior)	Pembroke	1925–1935	1929
Hon Thomas Murdoch^{[1]}	Buckingham	1914–1916; 1921–1944	1932
Hon Hubert Nichols	Meander	1902–1924; 1926–1935	1929
Hon George Pitt	Macquarie	1920–1932	1926
Hon William Propsting	Hobart	1905–1937	1929
Hon Tasman Shields	Launceston	1915–1936	1930
Hon Louis Shoobridge (senior)	Derwent	1921–1937	1931
Hon Alan Wardlaw	South Esk	1920–1938	1932

== Notes ==
^{1} On 1 August 1927, Tetley Gant, the member for Buckingham, retired. Thomas Murdoch, who had lost his Hobart seat a few months earlier, won the resulting by-election on 20 September 1927.

== Sources ==
- Hughes, Colin A.; Aitkin, Don (1986). Voting for the Australian State Upper Houses, 1890-1984. Canberra: Australian National University. ISBN 0-9097-7918-X.
- Parliament of Tasmania (2006). The Parliament of Tasmania from 1856
