= Members of the Tasmanian Legislative Council, 1939–1945 =

This is a list of members of the Tasmanian Legislative Council between 1939 and 1945. Terms of the Legislative Council did not coincide with Legislative Assembly elections, and members served six year terms, with a number of members facing election each year.

== Elections ==
Date	Electorates
2 May 1939	Cambridge; Hobart (1); Russell
7 May 1940	Hobart (1); Launceston (1); Gordon
6 May 1941	Hobart (1); Meander; Pembroke
5 May 1942	Huon; Launceston (1); Mersey
4 May 1943	Derwent; Tamar; Westmorland
2 May 1944	Buckingham; Macquarie; South Esk

== Members ==
Name	Division	Years in office	Elected
Hon Compton Archer	Macquarie	1944–1950	1944
Hon Albert Bendall	Macquarie	1932–1944	1938
Hon Percy Best^{[2]}	Meander	1935–1943	1941
Hon Archibald Blacklow	Pembroke	1936–1953	1941
Hon William Calvert	Huon	1924–1942	1936
Hon John Cheek^{[1]}	Westmorland	1907–1913; 1919–1942	1937
Hon Arthur Cutts	Tamar	1937–1955	1943
Hon Joe Darling	Cambridge	1921–1946	1939
Hon Charles Eady	Hobart	1925–1945	1940
Hon Alexander Evans	Launceston	1936–1942	1936
Hon Arthur Fenton	Russell	1933–1957	1939
Hon George Flowers^{[1]}	Westmorland	1942–1958	1943
Hon Dr John Gaha^{[3]} (Labor)	Hobart	1933–1943	1939
Hon Frank Hart	Launceston	1916–1940	1934
Hon Alexander Lillico	Mersey	1924–1954	1942
Hon Elliot Lillico^{[2]}	Meander	1943–1958	b/e
Hon James McDonald (Labor)	Gordon	1916–1922; 1928–1947	1940
Hon George McElwee (Labor)	Launceston	1940–1946	1940
Hon Thomas Murdoch	Buckingham	1914–1916; 1921–1944	1938
Hon Leslie Procter	South Esk	1939–1962	1944
Hon William Robinson	Launceston	1942–1948	1942
Hon Rupert Shoobridge	Derwent	1937–1955	1943
Hon William Strutt	Hobart	1938–1948	1941
Hon Arthur Tyler^{[3]} (Labor)	Hobart	1943–1945	b/e
Hon Bill Wedd	Buckingham	1944–1948	1944
Hon Rowland Worsley (Labor)	Huon	1942–1948	1942

== Notes ==
^{1} On 26 February 1942, John Cheek, the member for Westmorland, died. George Flowers won the resulting by-election on 5 May 1942.
^{2} On 14 April 1943, Percy Best, the member for Meander, died. Elliot Lillico, the son of Alexander Lillico, won the resulting by-election.
^{3} On 10 July 1943, Labor member Dr John Gaha, one of the three members for Hobart, resigned to successfully contest the federal seat of Denison at the 1943 election. Labor candidate Arthur Tyler won the resulting by-election on 14 September 1943 by a margin of three votes, and the unsuccessful candidate successfully petitioned the Supreme Court to void the election. Tyler won a second by-election on 22 January 1944 by a 211-vote margin against a different opponent.

== Sources ==
- Hughes, Colin A.; Aitkin, Don (1986). Voting for the Australian State Upper Houses, 1890–1984. Canberra: Australian National University. ISBN 0-9097-7918-X.
- Parliament of Tasmania (2006). The Parliament of Tasmania from 1856
