= Members of the Tasmanian Legislative Council, 1987–1993 =

This is a list of members of the Tasmanian Legislative Council between 1987 and 1993. Terms of the Legislative Council did not coincide with Legislative Assembly elections, and members served six year terms, with a number of members facing election each year.

== Elections ==
Date	Electorates
23 May 1987	Monmouth; Newdegate, Russell
28 May 1988	Hobart; Launceston; Gordon
27 May 1989	Tamar; Pembroke; Queenborough; West Devon
26 May 1990	Cornwall; Huon; Mersey
25 May 1991	Derwent; Meander; Westmorland
23 May 1992	Buckingham; Macquarie; South Esk

== Members ==
Name	Division	Years in office	Elected
Hon Dick Archer	South Esk	1980–1992	1986
Hon Ray Bailey	Cornwall	1990–2002	1990
Hon Charles Batt (Labor)	Derwent	1979–1995	1991
Hon Harry Braid	Mersey	1972–1990	1984
Hon Alby Broadby	Gordon	1968–1988	1982
Hon George Brookes	Westmorland	1991–1997	1991
Hon Darryl Chellis	Westmorland	1985–1991	1985
Hon Jeff Coates	Tamar	1971–1989	1983
Hon Dr David Crean (Labor)	Buckingham	1992–2004	1992
Hon Tony Fletcher	Russell	1981–2005	1987
Hon Ross Ginn	Newdegate	1986–1998	1987
Hon Hugh Hiscutt	West Devon	1983–1995	1989
Hon Reg Hope	Meander	1979–1997	1991
Hon John Loone	Tamar	1989–2001	1989
Hon Doug Lowe	Buckingham	1986–1992	1986
Hon Peter McKay	Pembroke	1976–1999	1989
Hon Robin McKendrick	Cornwall	1984–1990	1984
Hon Athol Meyer	Huon	1986–1996	1990
Hon Jean Moore^{[1]}	Hobart	1992–1994	b/e
Hon Hank Petrusma^{[1]}	Hobart	1982–1992	1988
Hon Colin Rattray	South Esk	1992–2004	1992
Hon Peter Schulze	Gordon	1988–1998	1988
Hon George Shaw	Macquarie	1968–1998	1992
Hon Geoff Squibb	Mersey	1990–2003	1990
Hon John Stopp	Queenborough	1983–1998	1989
Hon Stephen Wilson	Monmouth	1981–1999	1987
Hon Don Wing	Launceston	1982–2011	1988

== Notes ==
^{1} In January 1992, Hank Petrusma resigned to contest a House of Assembly seat in the 1992 elections, but was unsuccessful. Jean Moore won the resulting by-election on 11 April 1992.

== Sources ==
- Parliament of Tasmania (2006). The Parliament of Tasmania from 1856
