= Members of the Tasmanian Legislative Council, 1897–1903 =

This is a list of members of the Tasmanian Legislative Council between 1897 and 1903. Terms of the Legislative Council did not coincide with Legislative Assembly elections, and members served six year terms, with a number of members facing election each year.

== Elections ==
Date	Electorates
4 May 1897	Cambridge; Hobart (1); Russell
3 May 1898	Hobart (1); Launceston (1); North Esk
2 May 1899	Gordon; Hobart (1); Meander; Pembroke
8 May 1900	Huon; Launceston (1); Mersey
7 May 1901	Derwent; Tamar; Westmorland

== Members ==
Name	Division	Years in office	Elected
Hon Dr Gamaliel Butler	Hobart	1896–1914	1898
Hon George Collins	Tamar	1895–1919	1901
Hon William Crosby	Hobart	1885–1909	1897
Hon Charles Davies	Cambridge	1897–1921	1897
Hon Ellis Dean	Derwent	1901–1920	1901
Hon William Dodery	Westmorland	1877–1907	1901
Hon (Sir) Adye Douglas	Launceston	1855–1856; 1884–1886; 1890–1904	1898
Hon Tetley Gant^{[2]}	Buckingham	1901–1927	b/e
Hon Walter Gellibrand	Derwent	1871–1901	1895
Hon James Gibson^{[1]}	South Esk	1886–1899	1896
Hon William Gibson^{[4]}	Hobart	1901–1905	b/e
Hon Charles Henry Grant^{[4]}	Hobart	1892–1901	1899
Hon Frederick Grubb	Meander	1879–1911	1899
Hon William Hart^{[6]}	Launceston	1885–1904	1900
Hon John Henry^{[3]}^{[5]}	Mersey	1901–1902	
Hon Henry Lamb	Pembroke	1891–1899	1893
Hon John Hair McCall^{[3]}	Mersey	1888–1901	1900
Hon William Moore	Russell	1877–1909	1897
Hon Arthur Morrisby	Gordon	1899–1916	1899
Hon James Murdoch (senior)^{[7]}	Pembroke	1903–1925	b/e
Hon Hubert Nichols^{[5]}	Mersey	1902–1924; 1926–1935	b/e
Hon Alfred Page	Macquarie	1887–1909	1896
Hon William Watchorn Perkins^{[7]}	Pembroke	1899–1903	1899
Hon Frederick Piesse^{[2]}	Buckingham	1894–1901	1896
Hon Henry Rooke	North Esk	1886–1901	1898
Hon Robert Scott^{[1]}	South Esk	1899–1909	b/e
Hon John Watchorn	Huon	1882–1905	1900

== Notes ==
^{1} In February 1899, James Gibson, the member for South Esk, resigned. Robert Scott was elected unopposed on 16 March 1899.
^{2} In April 1901, Frederick Piesse, the member for Buckingham, resigned. Tetley Gant won the resulting by-election on 7 May 1901.
^{3} On 22 July 1901, John Hair McCall, the member for Mersey, died. John Henry won the resulting by-election on 16 August 1901.
^{4} On 30 September 1901, Charles Henry Grant, one of the three members for Hobart, died. William Gibson won the resulting by-election on 22 October 1901.
^{5} In June 1902, John Henry, the member for Mersey, resigned. Hubert Nichols won the resulting by-election on 18 July 1902.
^{6} In October 1902, William Hart, one of the two members for Launceston, resigned. He was returned unopposed on 26 November 1902.
^{7} On 19 January 1903, William Watchorn Perkins, the member for Pembroke, died. James Murdoch (senior) was elected unopposed on 7 February 1903.

== Sources ==
- Hughes, Colin A.; Aitkin, Don (1986). Voting for the Australian State Upper Houses, 1890-1984. Canberra: Australian National University. ISBN 0-9097-7918-X.
- Parliament of Tasmania (2006). The Parliament of Tasmania from 1856
