= Members of the Tasmanian Legislative Council, 1981–1987 =

This is a list of members of the Tasmanian Legislative Council between 1981 and 1987. Terms of the Legislative Council did not coincide with Legislative Assembly elections, and members served six year terms, with a number of members facing election each year.

== Elections ==
Date	Electorates
23 May 1981	Monmouth; Newdegate, Russell
22 May 1982	Hobart; Launceston; Gordon
28 May 1983	Tamar; Pembroke; Queenborough; West Devon
26 May 1984	Cornwall; Huon; Mersey
25 May 1985	Derwent; Meander; Westmorland
24 May 1986	Buckingham; Macquarie; South Esk

== Members ==
Name	Division	Years in office	Elected
Hon Dick Archer	South Esk	1980–1992	1986
Hon Charles Batt (Labor)	Derwent	1979–1995	1985
Hon Harry Braid	Mersey	1972–1990	1984
Hon Alby Broadby	Gordon	1968–1988	1982
Hon Darryl Chellis	Westmorland	1985–1991	1985
Hon Jeff Coates	Meander/Tamar^{[1]}	1971–1989	1983
Hon Tony Fletcher	Russell	1981–2005	1981
Hon Ross Ginn^{[3]}	Newdegate	1986–1998	b/e
Hon Oliver Gregory	Westmorland	1959–1985	1979
Hon Hugh Hiscutt	West Devon	1983–1995	1983
Hon Bill Hodgman	Queenborough	1971–1983	1977
Hon Peter Hodgman^{[2]}	Huon	1974–1986	1984
Hon Reg Hope	Tamar/Meander^{[1]}	1979–1997	1985
Hon Mac Le Fevre	Cornwall	1978–1984	1978
Hon Doug Lowe	Buckingham	1986–1992	1986
Hon Ken Lowrie	Macquarie/Buckingham	1968–1986	1980
Hon Peter McKay	Pembroke	1976–1999	1983
Hon Robin McKendrick	Cornwall	1984–1990	1984
Hon Athol Meyer^{[2]}	Huon	1986–1996	b/e
Hon Brian Miller^{[3]} (Labor)	Newdegate	1957–1986	1981
Hon Hank Petrusma	Hobart	1982–1992	1982
Hon George Shaw	Buckingham/Macquarie	1968–1998	1986
Hon Ray Shipp	Launceston	1968–1982	1976
Hon John Stopp	Queenborough	1983–1998	1983
Hon Kath Venn (Labor)	Hobart	1976–1982	1976
Hon Stephen Wilson	Monmouth	1981–1999	1981
Hon Don Wing	Launceston	1982–2011	1982
Hon William Young	West Devon	1971–1983	1977

== Notes ==
^{1} In 1982, the members for Tamar and Meander were appointed to each other's seats following a redistribution.
^{2} On 14 January 1986, Peter Hodgman, the member for Huon, resigned to run for a Franklin seat at the 8 February 1986 elections to the House of Assembly. Athol Meyer won the resulting by-election on 12 April 1986.
^{3} On 15 January 1986, Brian Miller, the Labor member for Newdegate, also resigned to contest the Assembly election, but was unsuccessful. Ross Ginn won the resulting by-election on 12 April 1986.

== Sources ==
- Hughes, Colin A.; Aitkin, Don (1986). Voting for the Australian State Upper Houses, 1890-1984. Canberra: Australian National University. ISBN 0-9097-7918-X.
- Parliament of Tasmania (2006). The Parliament of Tasmania from 1856
