= Members of the Tasmanian Legislative Council, 1891–1897 =

This is a list of members of the Tasmanian Legislative Council between 1891 and 1897. Terms of the Legislative Council did not coincide with Legislative Assembly elections, and members served six year terms, with a number of members facing election each year.

== Elections ==
Date	Electorates
5 May 1891	Cambridge; Hobart (1); Russell
3 May 1892	Hobart (1); Launceston (1); North Esk
2 May 1893	Hobart (1); Meander; Pembroke
1 May 1894	Huon; Launceston (1); Mersey
7 May 1895	Derwent; Tamar; Westmorland
5 May 1896	Buckingham; Macquarie; South Esk

== Members ==
Name	Division	Years in office	Elected
Hon Dr Gamaliel Butler^{[5]}	Hobart	1896–1914	by-election
Hon George Collins	Tamar	1895–1919	1895
Hon Audley Coote	Tamar	1886–1895	1889
Hon William Crosby	Hobart	1885–1909	1891
Hon William Dodery	Westmorland	1877–1907	1895
Hon Adye Douglas^{[2]}	Launceston	1855–1856; 1884–1886; 1890–1904	1891
Hon Philip Fysh^{[4]}	Buckingham	1866–1869; 1870–1873; 1884–1894	1890
Hon Walter Gellibrand	Derwent	1871–1901	1895
Hon James Gibson	South Esk	1886–1899	1896
Hon Charles Henry Grant^{[1]}	Hobart	1892–1901	1893
Hon Frederick Grubb	Meander	1879–1911	1893
Hon William Hart	Launceston	1885–1904	1894
Hon Henry Lamb	Pembroke	1891–1899	1893
Hon Alfred Lord	Cambridge	1890–1897	1891
Hon John Hair McCall	Mersey	1888–1901	1894
Hon Alexander McGregor^{[5]}	Hobart	1880–1896	1892
Hon William Moore^{[3]}	Russell	1877–1909	1891
Hon Alfred Page	Macquarie	1887–1909	1896
Hon Frederick Piesse^{[4]}	Buckingham	1894–1901	1896
Hon Henry Rooke	North Esk	1886–1901	1892
Hon George Salier^{[1]}	Hobart	1886–1892	1897
Hon John Watchorn	Huon	1882–1905	1894

== Notes ==
^{1} On 11 June 1892, George Salier, one of the three members for Hobart, died. Charles Henry Grant won the resulting by-election on 24 June 1892.
^{2} On 17 August 1892, the new Premier of Tasmania, Henry Dobson, appointed Sir Adye Douglas to the Ministry as Chief Secretary. As such he was required to resign and contest a ministerial by-election, and was returned unopposed on 26 August.
^{3} On 14 April 1894, the new Premier of Tasmania, Sir Philip Fysh, appointed William Moore to the Ministry as Chief Secretary. He resigned to contest a ministerial by-election, and was returned unopposed on 27 April.
^{4} On 14 April 1894, Sir Philip Fysh, the member for Buckingham, became Premier of Tasmania. Rather than contest his own seat at the ministerial by-election, Fysh transferred to the Legislative Assembly seat of North Hobart, which he won on 24 April, whilst Frederick Piesse, the former member for North Hobart, won the Buckingham seat in the Council by just four votes on 8 May 1894 against Dr Gamaliel Butler.
^{5} In April 1896, Alexander McGregor, one of the three members for Hobart, retired. Dr Gamaliel Butler won the resulting by-election on 6 May 1896.

== Sources ==
- Hughes, Colin A.; Aitkin, Don (1986). Voting for the Australian State Upper Houses, 1890-1984. Canberra: Australian National University. ISBN 0-9097-7918-X.
- Parliament of Tasmania (2006). The Parliament of Tasmania from 1856
