= Members of the Tasmanian Legislative Council =

These are lists of members of the Tasmanian Legislative Council. Members of the Legislative Council serve six-year terms, with two or three members facing re-election at periodic elections held every year. Due to the difficulty of categorising members without having lists for each individual year, members are categorised here in six-year blocks starting firstly from 1885 and then from 1999.

- 1879–1885
- 1885–1891
- 1891–1897
- 1897–1903
- 1903–1909
- 1909–1915
- 1915–1921
- 1921–1927
- 1927–1933
- 1933–1939
- 1939–1945
- 1945–1951
- 1951–1957
- 1957–1963
- 1963–1969
- 1969–1975
- 1975–1981
- 1981–1987
- 1987–1993
- 1993–1999
- 1999–2005
- 2005–2011
- 2011–2017
- 2017–2023
- 2023–2029
