= Members of the Tasmanian Legislative Council, 1879–1885 =

This is a list of members of the Tasmanian Legislative Council between 1879 and 1885. Terms of the Legislative Council did not coincide with Legislative Assembly elections, and members served six year terms, with a number of members facing election each year.

== Elections ==
Date	Electorates
1879	Cambridge; Hobart (1)
1880	Hobart (1); North Esk
1881	Hobart (1); Meander; Pembroke
1882	Huon; Tamar (1); Mersey
1883	Derwent; Tamar (1); Longford
1884	Buckingham; Jordan; South Esk

== Members ==
Name	Division	Years in office	Elected
Hon Dr James Agnew^{[6]}^{[9]}	Hobart; Jordan	1877–1881; 1884–1887	b/e
Hon James Aikenhead	Tamar	1870–1885	1882
Hon Donald Cameron	North Esk	1868–1886	1880
Hon Thomas Chapman^{[10]}	Buckingham	1873–1884	1878
Hon Dr William Crowther	Hobart	1869–1885	1879
Hon William Dodery	Longford	1877–1907	1883
Hon Adye Douglas^{[11]}	South Esk	1855–1856; 1884–1886; 1890–1904	b/e
Hon Thomas Field^{[5]}	Meander	1875–1881	1875
Hon William Fisher^{[4]}	Huon	1881–1882	b/e
Hon Philip Fysh^{[10]}	Buckingham	1866–1869; 1870–1873; 1884–1894	b/e
Hon Walter Gellibrand	Derwent	1871–1901	1883
Hon Frederick Grubb^{[1]}^{[3]}^{[5]}	Tamar; Meander	1879–1911	b/e x2
Hon William Grubb^{[1]}	Tamar	1869–1879	1877
Hon William Hodgson^{[7]}	Pembroke	1881–1891	b/e
Hon Frederick Innes^{[8]}	South Esk	1862–1872; 1877–1882	
Hon Charles Leake^{[8]}^{[11]}	South Esk	1882–1884	
Hon James Lord^{[7]}	Pembroke	1876–1881	b/e
Hon John Lord	Cambridge	1873–1890	1879
Hon Alexander McGregor^{[2]}	Hobart	1880–1896	b/e
Hon James MacLanachan^{[9]}	Jordan	1868–1884	1878
Hon William Moore	Mersey	1877–1909	1879
Hon James Robertson	Huon	1874–1880	1874
Hon John Scott^{[3]}	Tamar	1880–1890	b/e
Hon Joseph Solomon^{[4]}	Huon	1880	1880
Hon Dr Thomas Smart^{[6]}	Hobart	1881–1886	b/e
Hon John Watchorn^{[4]}	Huon	1882–1905	b/e
Hon Sir James Wilson^{[2]}	Hobart	1859–1880	1874

== Notes ==
^{1} On 8 February 1879, William Grubb, one of the two members for Tamar, died. Frederick Grubb won the resulting by-election on 6 March 1879.
^{2} On 29 February 1880, James Milne Wilson, one of the three members for Hobart, died. Alexander McGregor won the resulting by-election on 22 March 1880.
^{3} In October 1880, one of the two Tamar seats, held by Frederick Grubb, was declared vacant owing to his extended absence from the chamber. John Scott won the resulting by-election on 30 November 1880.
^{4} On 23 June 1880, Joseph Solomon was elected as the member for Huon. However, the election was ruled invalid, and a by-election was held on 5 November 1880. Solomon won the election but was disqualified, and William Fisher, the only other contestant, was deemed to have been elected at the poll. He died on 3 April 1882 and John Watchorn won the resulting by-election on 29 April 1882.
^{5} On 12 January 1881, Thomas Field, the member for Meander, died. Frederick Grubb won the resulting by-election on 12 February 1881.
^{6} On 2 March 1880, James Agnew, one of the three members for Hobart, resigned. Thomas Smart was elected unopposed on 8 March 1881.
^{7} On 22 May 1881, James Lord, the member for Pembroke died. William Hodgson won the resulting by-election on 2 July 1881.
^{8} On 11 May 1882, Frederick Innes, the member for South Esk, died. Charles Leake won the resulting by-election on 30 June 1882.
^{9} On 22 January 1884, James MacLanachan, the member for Jordan, died. James Agnew won the resulting by-election on 18 February 1884.
^{10} On 17 February 1884, Sir Thomas Chapman, the member for Buckingham, died. Sir Philip Fysh won the resulting by-election on 15 March 1884.
^{11} In July 1884, Charles Leake, the member for South Esk, resigned. Sir Adye Douglas won the resulting by-election on 21 August 1884.

== Sources ==
- Parliament of Tasmania (2006). The Parliament of Tasmania from 1856
