= President of the Tasmanian Legislative Council =

President of the Legislative Council
- Incumbent; Craig Farrell since 21 May 2019
- Appointer: Elected by the Tasmanian Legislative Council
- Inaugural holder: Thomas Horne
- Formation: 2 December 1856; 169 years ago
- Deputy: Ruth Forrest

The President of the Tasmanian Legislative Council is the presiding officer of the Council.

== Presidents of the Legislative Council ==
Member	Party	Electorate	Term in Office
Thomas Horne	Independent	Hobart	2 December 1856 – 2 September 1859
William Nairn		Meander	13 September 1859 – 25 August 1868
Frederick Innes	Independent	South Esk	25 August 1868 – 4 November 1872
(Sir) James Wilson	Independent	Hobart	4 November 1872 – 29 February 1880
Frederick Innes	Independent	South Esk	3 March 1880 – 11 May 1882
Thomas Chapman		Buckingham	11 July 1882 – 17 February 1884
Walter Gellibrand	Independent	Derwent	1 July 1884 – 9 July 1889
William Moore	Independent	Russell	9 July 1889 – 20 April 1894
(Sir) Adye Douglas	Independent	Launceston	20 April 1894 – 2 May 1904
William Dodery	Independent	Westmorland	10 May 1904 – 7 May 1907
Tetley Gant	Independent	Buckingham	9 July 1907 – 27 July 1926
William Propsting	Independent	Hobart	27 July 1926 – 3 December 1937
Thomas Murdoch	Independent	Buckingham	7 December 1937 – 3 May 1944
Charles Eady	Independent	Hobart	9 May 1944 – 20 December 1945
(Sir) Rupert Shoobridge	Independent	Derwent	26 February 1946 – 13 May 1955
Geoffrey Green	Independent	Monmouth	17 May 1955 – 21 April 1959
(Sir) Henry Baker	Independent	Queenborough	2 June 1959 – 20 July 1968
Walter Davis	Independent	West Devon	3 September 1968 – 7 October 1971
Hector McFie	Independent	Mersey	12 October 1971 – 25 May 1972
Charles Fenton	Independent	Russell	7 June 1972 – 22 May 1981
Bill Hodgman	Independent	Queenborough	9 June 1981 – 28 May 1983
Harry Braid	Independent	Mersey	7 June 1983 – 26 May 1984
Alby Broadby	Independent	Gordon	5 June 1984 – 28 May 1988
George Shaw	Independent	Macquarie	21 June 1988 – 14 July 1992
John Stopp	Independent	Queenborough	14 July 1992 – 27 May 1995
Reg Hope	Independent	Meander	20 June 1995 – 31 May 1997
Ray Bailey	Independent	Cornwall/Rosevears	17 June 1997 – 4 May 2002
Don Wing	Independent	Paterson	21 May 2002 – 10 June 2008
Sue Smith	Independent	Montgomery	10 June 2008 – 4 May 2013
Jim Wilkinson	Independent	Nelson	21 May 2013 – 3 May 2019
Craig Farrell	Labor	Derwent	21 May 2019 – present
