= Grubb's Tramway =

Grubb's Tramway is the name of at least two non-related tramways in Tasmania:

- Grubb's Tramway (Mowbray)
- Grubb's Tramway (Zeehan) also known as Grubb's Tram
