= Harry Conway (politician) =

Australian politician

Member of the Tasmanian House of Assembly for George Town
- In office 26 July 1886 – December 1893
- Preceded by: Audley Coote
- Succeeded by: George Gilmore

Personal details
- Born: 1829 Ashby-de-la-Zouch, Leicestershire
- Died: 2 April 1905 (aged 75–76) Launceston, Tasmania

Harry Conway (1829 – 2 April 1905) was an Australian politician.

Conway was born in Ashby-de-la-Zouch in Leicestershire in 1829. In 1886 he was elected to the Tasmanian House of Assembly, representing the seat of George Town. He served until his defeat in 1893. He died in 1905 in Launceston.

Tasmanian House of Assembly
Preceded by Audley Coote	Member for George Town; 1886–1893	Succeeded by George Gilmore
