= Thomas Cheek (Australian politician) =

Australian politician (1894–1994)

Thomas Lefroy Cheek (28 December 1894 – 26 September 1994) was an Australian politician.

He was born in Evandale, the son of politician John Cheek and his wife Lydia. In 1950 he was elected to the Tasmanian Legislative Council as the independent member for Macquarie. He served as Chair of Committees from 1966 until his retirement in 1968. Cheek died in 1994.

Tasmanian Legislative Council
Preceded by Compton Archer	Member for Macquarie; 1950–1968	Succeeded by George Shaw
