= Petrusma =

Petrusma is a surname. Notable people with the surname include:

- Jacquie Petrusma (born 1966), Australian politician
- Hank Petrusma (born 1942), Australian politician
