= William Grubb =

William Grubb may refer to:

- William Irwin Grubb, American judge
- William Dawson Grubb, Tasmanian politician, lawyer, and investor
