= Thomas Walduck =

Australian politician

Member of the Tasmanian House of Assembly for George Town
- In office 9 March 1900 – 2 April 1903
- Preceded by: George Gilmore
- Succeeded by: Jens Jensen

Personal details
- Born: Thomas Henry Walduck; 4 September 1844 Glenorchy, Van Diemen's Land
- Died: 24 January 1913 (aged 68) Beaconsfield, Tasmania

Thomas Henry Walduck (4 September 1844 – 24 January 1913) was an Australian politician.

Walduck was born in Glenorchy in Tasmania in 1844. In 1900 he was elected to the Tasmanian House of Assembly, representing the seat of George Town. He served until his defeat in 1903. He died in 1913 in Beaconsfield.

Tasmanian House of Assembly
Preceded by George Gilmore	Member for George Town; 1900–1903	Succeeded by Jens Jensen
