= Electoral division of Wellington =

Former Tasmanian Legislative Council electoral division

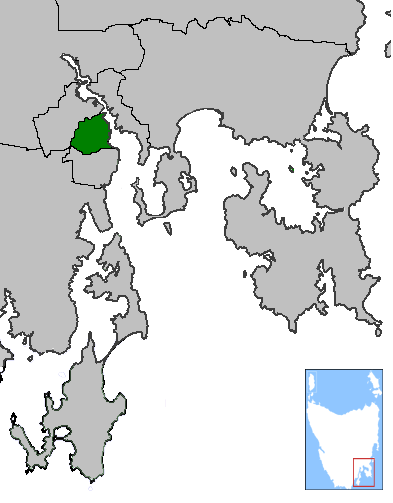
Wellington Electorate

The Electoral division of Wellington was one of the 15 electorates or seats in the Tasmanian Legislative Council from 1999 to 2008. It covered the Hobart suburbs of Battery Point, New Town, West Hobart, Moonah, Mount Stuart, Lutana and Lenah Valley. The name was derived from Mount Wellington which is a dominant feature of the area.

The last election held on 6 May 2006 returned sitting Labor Party member Doug Parkinson, who defeated five other candidates (4 independents, 1 Green).

The seat was abolished in a redistribution in 2008, and its original name of "Hobart" was restored.

== Members for Wellington ==
Image	Member	Party	Term	Notes
	Doug Parkinson (b. 1945)	Labor	31 July 1999 – 3 May 2008	Former MLC for Hobart. Successfully contested Hobart after Wellington abolished; retired in 2012

== See also ==
- Electoral division of Hobart
