= Charles Fenton =

Australian politician (1912–2009)

Charles Balfour Marcus Fenton AC (17 January 1912 – 12 June 2009) was an Australian politician.

He was born in Smithton. In 1957 he was elected to the Tasmanian Legislative Council as the independent member for Russell, succeeding his uncle Arthur Fenton. He was Chair of Committees from 1971 to 1972 and President of the Council from 1972 to his retirement in 1981. On 3 December 1975 he was appointed to the Executive Council to commemorate the 150th anniversary of its first sitting.

Tasmanian Legislative Council
Preceded by Hector McFie	President of the Tasmanian Legislative Council; 1972–1981	Succeeded by Bill Hodgman
Preceded by Arthur Fenton	Member for Russell; 1957–1981	Succeeded by Tony Fletcher
