= Phyllis Benjamin =

Australian politician (1907–1996)

The Honourable Phyllis Benjamin AO MBE

Member of the Tasmanian Legislative Council for Hobart
- In office 10 May 1952 – 22 May 1976
- Preceded by: John Soundy
- Succeeded by: Kath Venn

Personal details
- Born: Phyllis Jean Allsopp; 30 August 1907 Mosman, New South Wales
- Died: 6 April 1996 (aged 88)
- Party: Labor Party
- Spouse: Albert Benjamin (m. 1926)
- Relations: Bill Neilson (son-in-law)

Phyllis Jean Benjamin AO MBE (30 August 1907 – 9 April 1996), Labor Party politician, was a member of the Tasmanian Legislative Council in the electorate of Hobart from 10 May 1952 until her retirement on 22 May 1976.

Born Phyllis Allsopp, she married Albert Benjamin in Sydney on 10 March 1926.

In 1948, their daughter, Jill Benjamin, married Bill Neilson who went on to become Premier of Tasmania.

She stood for the division of Hobart as a Labor candidate when sitting member John Soundy retired on 10 May 1952. She won the division easily with 1,433 votes; the next highest candidate received only 563 votes. From 1951 to 1953 she was President of the Federated Association of Australian Housewives.

Despite her sex, Benjamin was reported as one of the "36 faceless men" reported to be in control of the Australian Labor Party in the lead up to the 1963 Australian federal election.

From 1968 to 1969, Benjamin was Leader of the Government in the Legislative Council, as one of only four representatives of her party in that chamber. She was the first woman to hold the position in any Australian legislative council.

== See also ==
- List of the first women holders of political offices in Oceania

Tasmanian Legislative Council
Preceded by John Soundy	Member for Hobart; 1952–1976	Succeeded by Kath Venn
Preceded by Thomas d'Alton	Leader of the Government in the Legislative Council; 1968–1969	Succeeded by Geoffrey Foot
