= Doug Parkinson (politician) =

Australian politician (born 1945)

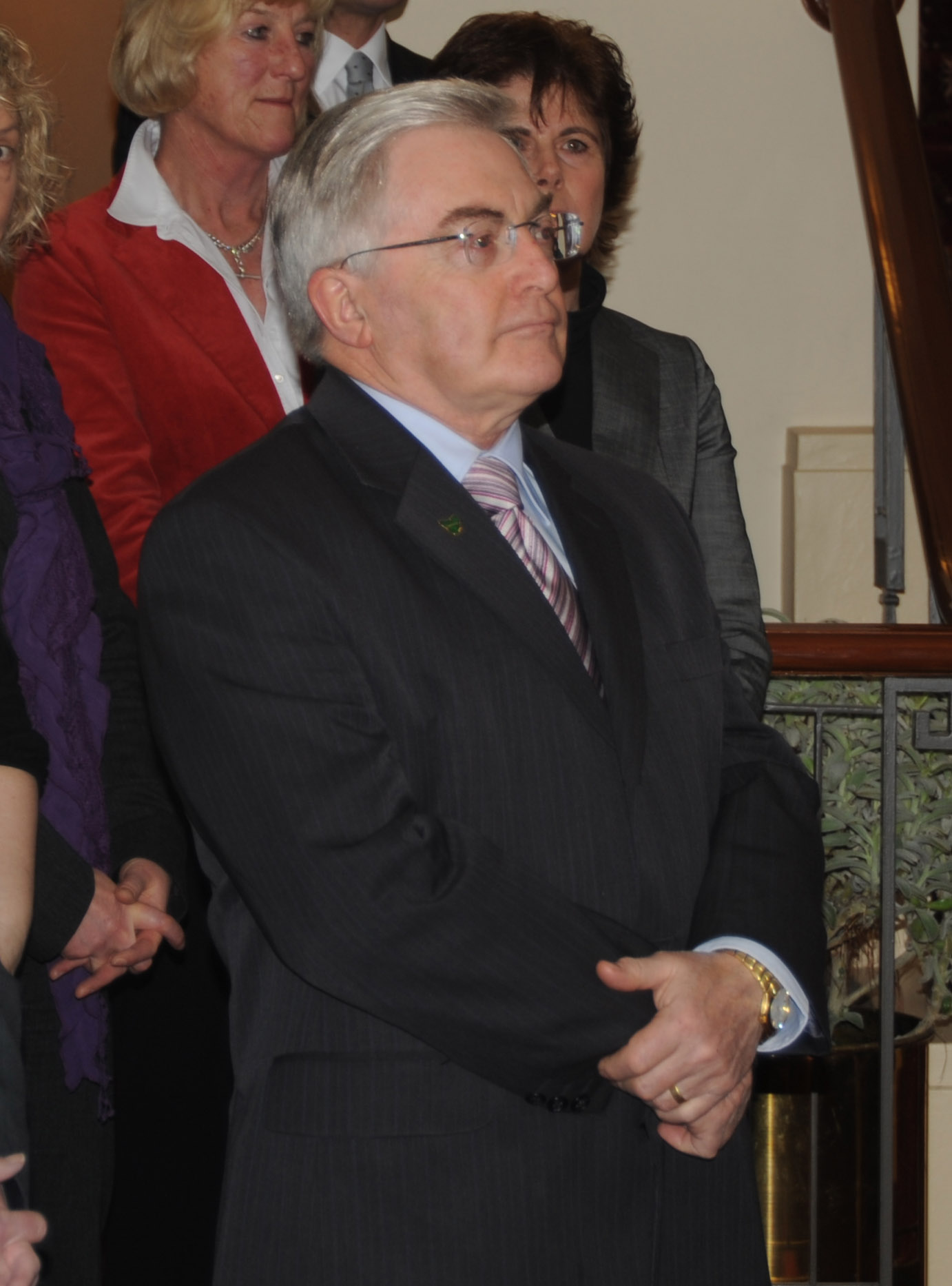
- Parkinson in 2009

Member of the Tasmanian Legislative Council
- In office 28 May 1994 – 5 May 2012
- Preceded by: Jean Moore
- Succeeded by: Rob Valentine
- Constituency: Hobart; Wellington

Personal details
- Born: Douglas John Parkinson; 5 June 1945 (age 81) Hobart, Tasmania, Australia
- Party: Labor
- Profession: Barrister

Douglas John Parkinson (born 5 June 1945 in Hobart) is a former Australian politician. He was a Labor Party member of the Tasmanian Legislative Council for the electoral division of Hobart from 1994 until his retirement in 2012.

Parkinson studied at St Virgil's College and the University of Tasmania, obtaining a Bachelor of Economics with Honours in 1971. He worked for the Commonwealth Public Service before studying law. After obtaining an LL.B. in 1981, he established a legal practice in Hobart and lectured part-time at the University of Tasmania.

Parkinson was first elected to Hobart in 1994. The division was abolished in 1999. He was elected to the division of Wellington in 2000 and again in 2006, with the division reverting to its prior name of Hobart in 2008.

Parkinson has announced his intention to run as an independent candidate for election for the newly created Legislative Council division of Prosser, to be held on 5 May 2018.

Tasmanian Legislative Council
Preceded by Jean Moore	Member for Hobart; 1994–1999	Abolished
New seat	Member for Wellington; 1999–2008	Abolished
New seat	Member for Hobart; 2008–2012	Succeeded by Rob Valentine
