= Lloyd Carins =

Australian politician

Lloyd Carins OBE

Chair of Committees in the Tasmanian Legislative Council
- In office 1979 – 1980

Member of Tasmanian Legislative Council for South Esk
- In office 1962 – 1980
- Preceded by: Leslie Procter
- Succeeded by: Dick Archer

Personal details
- Born: Lloyd Horton Carins; 29 June 1923
- Died: 16 July 2007 (aged 84)
- Party: Independent

Lloyd Horton Carins OBE (29 June 1923 – 16 July 2007) was an Australian politician in Tasmania.

He was born in Tasmania. In 1962 he was elected to the Tasmanian Legislative Council as the independent member for South Esk. He was Chair of Committees from 1979 to 1980, in which year he retired. Carins died on 16 July 2007, aged 84.

Tasmanian Legislative Council
| Preceded by Leslie Procter | Member for South Esk; 1962–1980 | Succeeded by Dick Archer |
