= Russell Anderson (politician) =

Australian politician (born 1951)

Russell Charles Anderson (born 21 April 1951) is a former Australian politician. Born in Williamstown, Victoria, he later moved to Tasmania. In 1998, he was elected to the Tasmanian Legislative Council as the Independent member for Macquarie. He held the seat until its abolition in 1999.

He contested Lyons for the Liberal Party at the 1996 federal election.

Tasmanian Legislative Council
Preceded by George Shaw	Member for Macquarie; 1998–1999	Abolished
