= Electoral district of George Town =

Former Tasmanian House of Assembly electoral district

The Electoral district of George Town was a single-member electoral district of the Tasmanian House of Assembly. It was centred on the town of George Town in Tasmania's Tamar Valley region north of Launceston.

The seat was created ahead of the Assembly's first election held in 1856, and was abolished when the Tasmanian parliament adopted the Hare-Clark electoral model in 1909.

== Members for George Town ==
Member	Term
Charles Henty	1856–1862
Thomas John Knight	1862–1865
John Scott	1865–1866
William Barnes	1866–1869
James Scott	1869–1877
George Gilmore	1877–1879
Audley Coote	1879–1886
Harry Conway	1886–1893
George Crosby Gilmore	1893–1900
Thomas Walduck	1900–1903
Jens Jensen	1903–1909
