= Electoral district of Kentish =

Former electoral district of Tasmania

The electoral district of Kentish was a single-member electoral district of the Tasmanian House of Assembly. It centred on the town of Sheffield in Tasmania's north, inland from Devonport.

The seat was created in a redistribution ahead of the 1903 state election from the southern part of West Devon and smaller parts of Devonport, and was abolished when the Tasmanian parliament adopted the Hare-Clark electoral model in 1909. It had a single member during its existence, John Hope, who had previously represented the seat of Devonport and went on to represent the new Wilmot division.

== Members for Kentish ==
Member	Term
John Hope	1903–1909
