= Reg Hope =

Australian politician (1927–2010)

Reginald Thomas Hope

President of the Tasmanian Legislative Council
- In office 20 June 1995 – 31 May 1997
- Preceded by: John Stopp
- Succeeded by: Ray Bailey

Personal details
- Born: 12 June 1927
- Died: 16 December 2010 (aged 83)
- Party: Independent

Reginald Thomas "Reg" Hope (12 June 1927 – 16 December 2010) was an Independent member of the Tamar and (from 1982) Meander divisions of the Tasmanian Legislative Council from 1979 to 1997.

Hope was born in Sheffield, Tasmania. He served as President of the Tasmanian Legislative Council from 1995 to 1997. The Reg Hope Foreshore Park in Devonport, Tasmania is named in his honour.

Hope died on 16 December 2010. At his death, Premier David Bartlett noted that he was "decent, honest, straightforward and committed to helping Tasmanians," while Don Wing said that he was "gregarious, passionate but above all a gentleman."

Tasmanian Legislative Council
Preceded by John Stopp	President of the Tasmanian Legislative Council; 1995–1997	Succeeded by Ray Bailey
Preceded by Daniel Hitchcock	Member for Tamar; 1979–1982	Succeeded by Jeff Coates
Preceded by Jeff Coates	Member for Meander; 1982–1997	Abolished
