= Compton Archer =

Australian politician (1885–1961)

Compton Abbott Archer (3 July 1885 – 24 May 1961) was an Australian politician.

He was born in Longford, Tasmania. In 1944 he was elected to the Tasmanian Legislative Council as the independent member for Macquarie. He held the seat until his defeat in 1950. Archer died in Hagley in 1961.

Tasmanian Legislative Council
Preceded by Albert Bendall	Member for Macquarie; 1944–1950	Succeeded by Thomas Cheek
