= Arthur Tyler (politician) =

Australian politician

Arthur James Tyler (26 December 1883 – 20 July 1972) was an Australian politician.

He was born in Newcastle, New South Wales. In 1943 he was elected to the Tasmanian Legislative Council as the Labor member for Hobart. His victory had been by only three votes and was declared void by the Supreme Court on a challenge; Tyler won the resulting by-election in January 1944. He was, however, defeated in 1945. He died in Hobart in 1972.

Tasmanian Legislative Council
Preceded by Frank Gaha	Member for Hobart; 1943–1945; Served alongside: Charles Eady, William Strutt	Succeeded by Dennis Lonergan
