= John Murdoch (politician) =

Australian politician

John Murdoch (15 March 1882 – 17 August 1936) was an Australian politician.

He was born in Hobart, the son of James Murdoch, also a politician. In 1935 he was elected to the Tasmanian Legislative Council as the independent member for Pembroke following the death of his younger brother James. He served until his death the following year.

Tasmanian Legislative Council
Preceded by James Murdoch, Jr.	Member for Pembroke; 1935–1936	Succeeded by Archibald Blacklow
