= Electoral division of Jordan =

Former Tasmanian Legislative Council electoral division

The electoral division of Jordan was an electoral division in the Tasmanian Legislative Council of Australia. It existed from 1856 to 1885.

== Members ==
Member	Party	Period
Edward Bisdee	Independent	1856–1858
Isaac Bisdee	Independent	1858–1868
James MacLanachan	Independent	1868–1884
James Agnew	Independent	1884–1885

== See also ==
- Tasmanian Legislative Council electoral divisions
