= Jean Moore =

Australian politician (1933–2016)

Member of the Tasmanian Legislative Council for Hobart
- In office 11 April 1992 – 28 May 1994
- Preceded by: Hank Petrusma
- Succeeded by: Doug Parkinson

Personal details
- Born: 8 November 1933 Evandale, Tasmania
- Died: 26 November 2016 (aged 83)
- Party: Independent
- Occupation: Nurse

Jean Mary Moore (8 November 1933 – 26 November 2016) was an Australian politician.

She was born in Evandale, Tasmania. In 1992 she was elected to the Tasmanian Legislative Council as the independent member for Hobart, holding the seat until her defeat by Labor candidate Doug Parkinson in 1994.

Tasmanian Legislative Council
Preceded by Hank Petrusma	Member for Hobart; 1992–1994	Succeeded by Doug Parkinson
