= James McKenzie (Australian politician) =

Australian politician

James Albert McKenzie (4 October 1867 – 19 August 1939) was an Australian politician.

He was born in Hobart. In 1927 he was elected to the Tasmanian Legislative Council as an independent member for Hobart. He served until he was defeated in 1933.

Tasmanian Legislative Council
Preceded by Thomas Murdoch	Member for Hobart; 1927–1933; Served alongside: Charles Eady, William Propsting	Succeeded by Frank Gaha
