= James Chapman (Australian politician) =

Australian politician (1855–1925)

James Robison Chapman (25 September 1855 – 12 April 1925) was an Australian politician.

He was born in Hawthorn in Melbourne. In 1922, he was elected to the Tasmanian Legislative Council as an independent member for Hobart. He served until his death in 1925.

Tasmanian Legislative Council
Preceded by William Williams	Member for Hobart; 1922–1925; Served alongside: Thomas Murdoch, William Propsting	Succeeded by Charles Eady
