= Grubb's Tramway (Zeehan) =

Light railway in Zeehan, Tasmania, Australia

Coordinates: 41.8897°S 145.2853°E

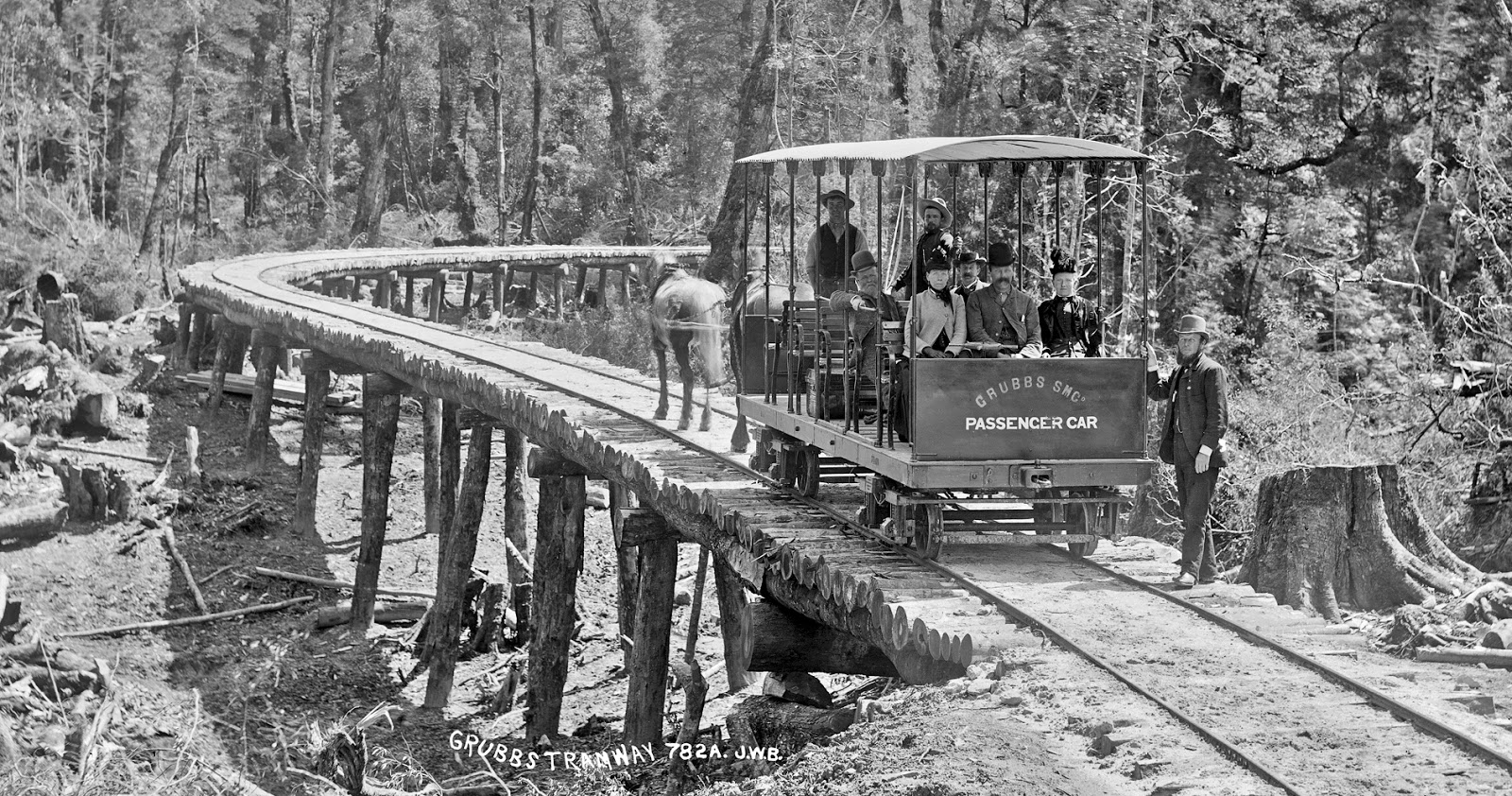
- Grubbs S.M. Co., Zeehan, ca. 1900

Technical
- Line length: 4.200 mi (6.759 km)
- Track gauge: 3 ft 6 in (1,067 mm)
- Minimum radius: 3 chains (60 m)
- Maximum incline: 1 in 25 (40 ‰) %

Grubb's Tramway was a more than 4 miles (6.4 km) long horse-drawn light railway in Western Tasmania. It was opened in 1891 from Zeehan to Summit and the Colonel North Mine. It became the Colonel North Tramway in 1899 and closed in 1927. Three times a day, a "Goods Truck" carrying passengers ran every day (Sundays excepted). The uphill journey lasted at least 90 min or more. The return journey from the hill summit to Zeehan, a distance of 2.150 miles (3.460 km), was accomplished in six minutes.

== Location ==
The line started in Zeehan at the Main Street, about half a-mile from the Zeehan railway station. Leaving the Main Street, the line ascended a steep grade to the summit of the hill a distance of 2.275 miles (3.661 km). The passenger car could contain up to thirty passengers, and it took three horses to convey it to the top, but when it reached there, the horses were detached and the car under the control of a very powerful brake, moved downwards with its own momentum to the mine, a further distance of 1.287 miles (2.071 km), or a total journey of 3.437 miles (5.531 km) from the starting point. The maximum grade throughout was 1 in 25 (40%); the sharpest curve having a three-chain (60 m) radius. At a distance of 1.750 miles (2.816 km) from Zeehan a viaduct some 12 chains (241 m) in length was traversed, the height from the ground being, in some places, fully 40 feet (12 m). There were also two small bridges on the line. The line had a gauge of 3 ft 6 in (1,067 mm), and was constructed of 18 pounds per yard (8.9 kg/m) rails, laid on sleepers with 2 feet (610 mm) centres.

== Planning and survey ==
In April 1898 two prospectors were sent out by a few Hobart businessmen to prospect in the Zeehan district, and after a few months of labor, their efforts were successful. Going down to the creek one morning, on the very spot where the mine was subsequently erected, the lode was discerned cropping out on the surface in the shape of a large boulder.

Immediately after, two 80 acre sections were pegged off on the course of the lode, and prospecting operations were continuously persevered in by the syndicate for a considerable time, amidst all the difficulties which surrounded prospecting on the West Coast, at that time, when everything had to be carried in on the men's backs. However, this work was continued, and notwithstanding the enormous cost of getting ore out to the main track, and forwarding it to Trial Harbour for shipment, 70 tons of ore was obtained and sent to various places for treatment, with the most satisfactory results.

The property consisted of two 80 acre sections, running longitudinally from north to south, and thus securing the greatest length on line of lode, about 4,000 feet (1,200 m). The lode has been cut in the centre of the property, and stripped for a length of 40 feet (12 m) by a depth of 4 feet (1.2 m) The breadth of the lode was 2.5 feet (0.76 m)., composed of silver-lead, quartz, and porphyry. The pure silver-lead ore formed a 18 inches (460 mm) of the entire lode. The remainder being gangue thickly impregnated with silver-lead was classed, as good second-class stuff, suitable for concentrating.

== Set-up of the company ==
All this was done before it was proposed to offer the property to the public. It was, however, evident to the businessmen concerned in this venture, that a much larger amount of capital would be required to develop the property than they could reasonably hope to be able to provide, and with the necessity for the construction of a tramway staring them in the face, it was resolved to invite the assistance of outside capital, feeling assured that there would be every inducement to warrant the expectation of a speedy and successful notation of the company.

The preliminary pilot exploration looked quite promising: The result of 10 tons of ore sent to the Stolborg Smelting Works in Germany, was 58½ % lead, and 61oz, 8dwt. 4gr. silver to the ton, which gave £14 per ton clear of all smelting charges.

The company was very quickly floated, with a capital of £46,000, and the first meeting of shareholders was held on 18 February 1890, when rules were adopted and directors appointed. One of the first things considered by the directors, after their first meeting, was the best means to adopt for obtaining access to the mine, and, after mature deliberation, it was decided that it would be in the best interests of the shareholders to construct an efficient tramway in the first instance. For while machinery could have been got to out mine by the construction of a much less costly road, yet after this was done the expenditure would have been comparatively useless, and a tramway similar to that opened today would have had to be undertaken, in order to have the mine connected with the Government railway.

== Survey ==
The only route available for a track or cart road, for the purpose of getting up machinery, was via the Comstock, and this, if constructed, would have had to be abandoned, as it would have been in almost an opposite direction to the terminus of the Government railway, and even after arriving at the Comstock, the distance from then to the railway is further than from the mine by the subsequently built line, Further, the nature of the country passed through, showed that it was altogether impracticable, to construct a macadamised road, and that the decision of the directors to have a steel railroad was, under all the circumstances, the wisest and best course.

The survey to obtain the best route for this line was a very arduous piece of work, as over 20 miles of tracks had to be cut through a dense myrtle forest and rough country, before a route could be finally decided upon. Even with the knowledge since obtained by the opening up of the country, and information gathered during the progress of the work, it was still believed that the very best line possible has been secured.

== Construction ==
The construction of the line was entrusted by the directors to Mr R. O. Grubb, who explored the country for the best route, and assisted the surveyor in laying out the same. During the construction of the line, Mr Grubb was assisted by Mr Woolcock, the mining manager. This work has been a heavy undertaking, owing to the broken and mountainous character of the country passed through, the large cuttings which had to be contended with, and the deep gorges which had to be bridged over or filled up.

== Cost ==
The directors were in possession of the lease from the Government of the land upon which the tramway was constructed from the mine to the Government Railway including a station. The total cost of the line has been £11,395, and while it had been a costly work, yet the directors were satisfied that they had a very valuable line, and by its construction they have obtained one of the greatest facilities for the development of mining in the district, as the tramway passes through the properties of the following companies:

- Silver Prince
- Balstrup Central
- Manganese Hill
- Mount Zeehan (Tasmania)
- S.L.M. Co.
- Balstrup Junction
- North Grubb's
- Nubeena

During the construction of the tramline, preliminary mining operations have been carried out as far at it was possible to do so in the absence of heavy machinery; but the directors were convinced, and the mining manager advised, that the best course to adopt was to push on with the tram and discontinue mining until machinery could be got on the ground. It was decided to obtain a portable winding engine and boiler from England, which has been done at a cost of about £850, delivered to the mine. A 40 h.p Tangye engine was purchased in Victoria as well as pumping gear, pumps and winding plant, and steel boiler. The total cost of machinery delivered to the mine was approximately £3500. The following tenders were accepted :

- Messrs Humble and Nicholson, of Geelong, for extra strong pumping gear: £543 15s
- Mr W. Cooper, of Clunes, for pumps and pumping plant: £218
- Messrs McKay Bros., of Hobart and Zeehan, for steel boiler: £160.

== Opening ==
On Friday, 23 October 1891 a large gathering assembled, in response to the invitation of the Grubb S.M. Co., for the purpose of celebrating the opening of the Grubb Tram Line, and the starting of the new machinery at the mine. The first car left the junction of the Henty line and the Zeehan Main Street shortly after 10 a.m., and another car left about noon.

Arriving at the end of the journey, Mr W. C. Grubb, the legal manager, and Mr Woolcock, showed the visitors over the company's ground, and the new machinery was also open for inspection. The engine is a 20 h.p. double cylinder, and is at present used for the winding drums. At 2 p.m. all assembled in the engine house, about one hundred persons being present, and the engine being set in motion. Sir W. C. Grubb broke the orthodox bottle of Champagne over it.

== Operation ==
In December 1890 the Grubb mine was less than 100 feet (30 m) deep, but until end of June 1893 then a level has been put in and the lode cut at 130 feet (40 m) and 200 feet (61 m) from the surface at both these levels. At that time the north end of the 200 feet (61 m) level showed nearly 3 feet (0.91 m) of clean metal. The ore assays up to 127oz silver and 82% lead, and this lode has shown a significant improvement in quality as depth was gained. After consultation with the mine manager, a tunnel was extended by contract labour. The Grubb Company's tramway passed the mouth of the tunnel, and the cost of getting stores, etc., to the mine was thus a small item. In event of the company obtaining payable ore it could have been placed at the Zeehan railway station at as low a rate as any mine on the field.

== Transfer of ownership, nationalisation and closure ==
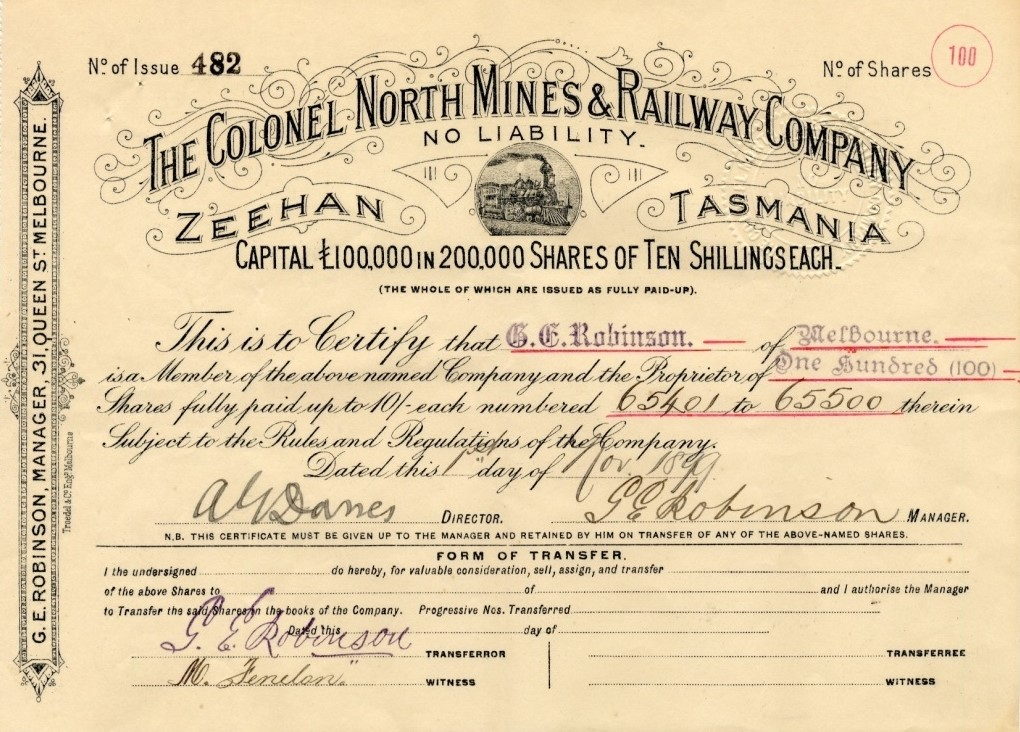
Certificate of The Colonel North Mines & Railway Company, Zeehan, Tasmania, 1 November 1899

The Grubb's Tramway became the Colonel North Tramway in 1899. The Company was founded in 1899 by taking over all properties from the Grubb's Company and the Colonel North Mining Company. The new company issued 200,000 shares of 10s. each. The key objective was mining, development of the properties and extending the company's railway to the Comstock District.

The ownership of tramway was later transferred to the government. On 27 January 1912, J. E. Ogden protested against an easement being granted on the Old Colonel North tram, Zeehan, which belonged to the Government. The Minister, Hon. A. Hean, said he would make full enquiry before granting the concession asked for. The tramway closed in 1927.

== Disambiguation ==
- Grubb's Tramway (Mowbray)

== Further Literature ==
Lindsay Whitham: Grubb's, Colonel North, Comstock and associated tramways, Zeehan. In: Light railways, June 2006, St Ives, N.S.W., pp. 9–14.
