= Oliver Gregory =

Australian politician

Oliver Harold Gregory (28 January 1917 – 16 June 2001) was an Australian politician.

He was born in Launceston. In 1959 he was elected to the Tasmanian Legislative Council as the independent member for Westmorland. He served until his retirement in 1985.

Tasmanian Legislative Council
Preceded by George Flowers	Member for Westmorland; 1959–1985	Succeeded by Darryl Chellis
