= George Brookes =

Harry George "George" Brookes (8 December 1934 – 14 April 2011) was a long-serving politician in Tasmania, Australia, firstly by being elected onto the now defunct St Leonards Council, and in latter years to the Tasmanian Legislative Council (25 May 1991 – 31 May 1997).

== Biography ==
Brookes was educated at Invermay Primary School & Launceston Technical College. He spent 27 years in the newspaper industry as a machine compositor with the Launceston Examiner, and spent 2 years in Victoria with the Colac Herald and the Melbourne Sun.

He was nominated for Patersonia Ward on 26 March 1963, against the sitting Councillor, and trebled his vote to win the seat. In February the following year (1964), he was appointed justice of the peace by the Executive Council. Brookes served total of 8 years as Warden of St Leonards. He ran St Leonards Junior Council for four years, teaching school children debating skills and meeting procedure. He resigned from St Leonards Council just prior to amalgamation in 1984. Brookes later won a seat on the Launceston City Council in March 1991, and was elected to the Tasmanian Legislative Council two months later he was an alderman for the Launceston City Council.

Early in his time as a Member of Legislative Council, he was a prominent anti-gay rights campaign, stating on the floor parliament "Do not let them [gay men] sully our state with their evil activities."

He was employed in the insurance industry for 14 years. Brookes was involved with Red Cross door-knock campaigns for 17 years, as an Area Chairman, and served four years as President of the East Launceston and South Launceston Football Clubs, and a Commissioner with the Statewide Football League. He was a member of the Launceston Hospital Board for 2 years, and a member of the Launceston College Council for 2 years.

Tasmanian Legislative Council
Preceded by Darryl Chellis	Member for Westmorland; 1991–1997	Succeeded by Silvia Smith
