= Kath Venn =

Australian politician (1926–2019)

Kath Venn OAM

Member of the Tasmanian Legislative Council for Hobart
- In office 22 May 1976 – 27 May 1982
- Preceded by: Phyllis Benjamin
- Succeeded by: Hank Petrusma

Personal details
- Born: Kathleen Joan Darragh; 12 November 1926 Hobart, Tasmania, Australia
- Died: 26 May 2019 (aged 92) New Town, Tasmania, Australia
- Party: Labor Party
- Spouse: Leo Venn (m. 1951)
- Education: Ogilvie High School

Kathleen Joan Venn OAM (12 November 1926 – 26 May 2019) was an Australian politician. Born in Tasmania, she was a Labor member of the Tasmanian Legislative Council from 1976 to 1982, representing the seat of Hobart. In 1982, she was defeated. She ran for the Senate in the 1984 election as an independent affiliated with Senator Brian Harradine, and received 8.6% of the vote, but preferences from Labor and the Nuclear Disarmament Party gave the seventh seat to Democrat Norm Sanders, who had 6% of the vote. In 2005 Venn was inducted to the Tasmanian Honour Roll of Women for service to the Community.

Tasmanian Legislative Council
Preceded by Phyllis Benjamin	Member for Hobart; 1976–1982	Succeeded by Hank Petrusma
