= Audley Coote =

Australian politician

Member of the Tasmanian House of Assembly for George Town
- In office 11 January 1879 – July 1886
- Preceded by: George Gilmore
- Succeeded by: Harry Conway

Member of the Tasmanian Legislative Council for Tamar
- In office 13 July 1886 – 7 May 1895
- Preceded by: John Scott
- Succeeded by: George Collins

Personal details
- Born: 27 May 1839 Witham, Essex
- Died: 4 June 1915 (aged 76) Rylstone, New South Wales

Audley Coote (27 May 1839 – 4 June 1915) was an Australian politician.

Coote was born in Witham in Essex in 1839. In 1879, he was elected to the Tasmanian House of Assembly, representing the seat of George Town. He transferred to the Tasmanian Legislative Council in 1886, representing Tamar until 1895. He was later consul to Hawaii and Panama, and was twice awarded the Legion of Honour. He died in 1915 in Rylstone in New South Wales.

Tasmanian House of Assembly
Preceded by George Gilmore	Member for George Town; 1879–1886	Succeeded by Harry Conway
Tasmanian Legislative Council
Preceded by John Scott	Member for Tamar; 1886–1895	Succeeded by George Collins
