= George Flowers (politician) =

Australian politician

George Lenthorn Flowers (29 March 1879 – 7 December 1958) was an Australian politician. He was born in Caveside, Tasmania. In 1942 he was elected to the Tasmanian Legislative Council as the Independent member for Westmorland. He was Chair of Committees from 1952 to 1957. He served in the council until his death at Launceston in 1958.

Tasmanian Legislative Council
| Preceded by John Cheek | Member for Westmorland; 1942–1958 | Succeeded by Oliver Gregory |
