= William Dawson Grubb =

Australian politician

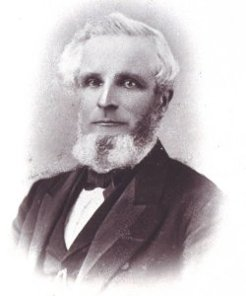
William Dawson Grubb, by J. W. Beattie.

William Dawson Grubb was a Tasmanian politician, lawyer, and investor in timber and mining ventures.

Grubb was born on 16 October 1817, in London, England. He first came to Van Diemen's Land in 1832, but returned to England to complete his legal qualifications. While in England, he married Marianne Beaumont.

After he returned to Tasmania in 1842, he was admitted as a barrister and solicitor to the Supreme Court of Tasmania. He was the member of the Tasmanian Legislative Council for the electorate of Tamar from 14 July 1869 to February 1879.

In addition to his successful legal practice, Grubb's main business ventures were in timber and mining. His most successful investments were in the New Native Youth and Tasmania gold mines. The Tasmania mine at Beaconsfield had paid dividends of over £700,000 by 1900, and it was one of the deepest and richest mines in Australia, by the time it closed in 1914. One of the three original shafts of the mine, commenced in 1879, was named for Grubb.

In December 1877, he was one of the buyers of the land, plant and mining lease of the Tamar Hematite Iron Company. The buyers, four wealthy Tasmanian politicians and a Launceston merchant, were then able to obtain a valuable gold mining lease adjacent to the Tasmania lease, for a small outlay. They did that under the provisions of new mining legislation, upon which the politicians had just voted. Certainly a conflict of interest, today it would be seen as corruption.

William Grubb died at Launceston, Tasmania, on 8 February 1879. He was survived by three sons and two daughters. His eldest son was Frederick William Grubb, who became the member for Tamar following his father's death.

His name was given to a colonial-era timber tramway in which he was involved, Grubb's Tramway (Mowbray). Another later colonial-era tramway, Grubb's Tramway (Zeehan), was named after his eldest son.
