= Darryl Chellis =

Australian politician (born 1936)

Darryl Osmond Chellis (born 3 April 1936) is a former Australian politician.

He was born in Burnie, Tasmania. In 1985 he was elected to the Tasmanian Legislative Council as the independent member for Westmorland. He served until his retirement in 1991.

Tasmanian Legislative Council
Preceded by Oliver Gregory	Member for Westmorland; 1985–1991	Succeeded by George Brookes
