= George Shaw (Tasmanian politician) =

Australian politician (born 1932)

George Arthur Shaw (born 15 August 1932) is a former Australian politician.

He was born in Tasmania. In 1968 he was elected to the Tasmanian Legislative Council as the independent member for Macquarie. From 1982 to 1986 he was Chair of Committees, and he was elected President in 1988, serving until 1992. Shaw retired from politics in 1998.

Tasmanian Legislative Council
Preceded by Alby Broadby	President of the Tasmanian Legislative Council; 1988–1992	Succeeded by John Stopp
Preceded by Thomas Cheek	Member for Macquarie; 1968–1998	Succeeded by Russell Anderson
