= Arthur Loone =

Australian politician

Arthur William Loone (28 April 1857 – 15 June 1936) was an Australian politician who was born in Bath in England. In 1910, he was elected to the Tasmanian Legislative Council as the Independent member for South Esk. He resigned in 1919 to contest the Senate but was unsuccessful; he was subsequently re-elected unopposed in the by-election to fill his Legislative Council vacancy. He was defeated later in 1920. Loone died in Scottsdale.

Tasmanian Legislative Council
Preceded by Christopher O'Reilly	Member for South Esk; 1910–1920	Succeeded by Alan Wardlaw
