= George Crosby Gilmore =

Australian politician

George Crosby Gilmore B.A., LL.M., (7 December 1860 – 15 January 1937) was an Australian politician, commonly referred to as Crosby Gilmore.

He was born in Launceston. He qualified LLM at Cambridge University and was admitted barrister-at-law of the Inner Temple.

In 1893 he was elected to the Tasmanian House of Assembly as the member for George Town. He retired in 1900, but in 1903 he returned to the House as the member for Waratah. He resigned in March 1906 to run for West Hobart, but was unsuccessful. Gilmore died in Hobart in 1937.

== Family ==
Gilmore married Agnes E. Kayser, daughter of mine manager G. W. F. Kayser on 26 April 1898
