= Jeff Coates =

Australian politician (1925–2016)

Jeffrey Allan Coates (19 November 1925 – 18 June 2016) was an Australian politician.

== Life and career ==
Coates was born in Deloraine on 19 November 1925. In 1971 he was elected to the Tasmanian Legislative Council as the independent member for Meander. He transferred to Tamar in 1982, and retired from politics in 1989.

Coates died on 18 June 2016, at the age of 90.

Tasmanian Legislative Council
| Preceded by Charles Best | Member for Meander; 1971–1982 | Succeeded by Reg Hope |
| Preceded by Reg Hope | Member for Tamar; 1982–1989 | Succeeded by John Loone |
