= Frank Edwards (Australian politician) =

Australian politician

Frank Bathurst Edwards (6 September 1887 – 5 March 1983) was an Australian politician.

== Life and career ==
Born in Bathurst, New South Wales, he was educated at Hutchins School and read law at the University of Tasmania. From 1909 to 1912 he was a Rhodes Scholar at Merton College, Oxford.

Edwards was elected to the Tasmanian Legislative Council as the Independent member for Russell in 1921. He served until he was defeated in 1933; the following year he contested the Tasmanian House of Assembly as a Nationalist candidate for Darwin and was elected. He remained in parliament until his resignation in 1940.

Tasmanian Legislative Council
Preceded by Charles Hall	Member for Russell; 1921–1933	Succeeded by Arthur Fenton
