= Dick Archer =

Australian politician (1927–2009)

Member of Tasmanian Legislative Council for South Esk
- In office 1980 – 1992
- Preceded by: Lloyd Carins
- Succeeded by: Colin Rattray

Personal details
- Born: Richard Clive Archer; 11 May 1927 Calder, Tasmania
- Died: 21 December 2009 (aged 82)
- Party: Independent

Richard Clive Archer (11 May 1927 – 21 December 2009) was an Australian politician in Tasmania.

He was born in Calder, Tasmania. In 1980 he was elected to the Tasmanian Legislative Council as the independent member for South Esk. In the 1980s and 90s, he was among a number of notable defenders of the Tasmanian ban on homosexuality; On 1 November 1989, he stated on the floor of parliament that "The police need to … track down and wipe out ... deviant Aids carriers".

He served until his retirement in 1992. Archer died on 21 December 2009, aged 82.

Tasmanian Legislative Council
Preceded by Lloyd Carins	Member for South Esk; 1980–1992	Succeeded by Colin Rattray
