= Frank Gaha =

Australian politician (1894–1966)

Dr Frank Gaha
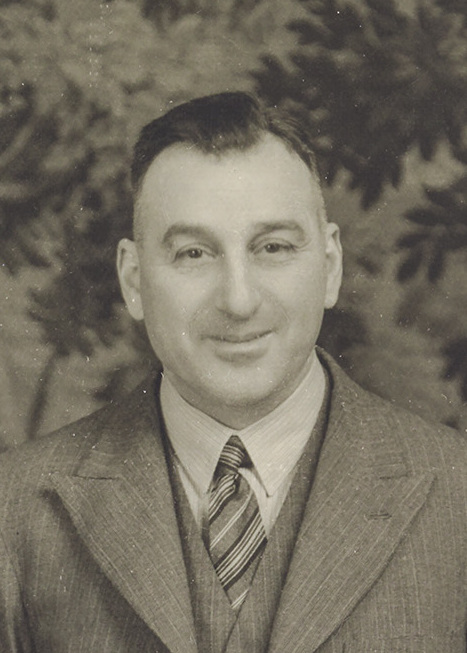
- Gaha in 1939

Member of the Tasmanian House of Assembly
- In office 6 May 1950 – 2 May 1964
- Constituency: Denison

Member of the Australian Parliament for Denison
- In office 21 August 1943 – 31 October 1949
- Preceded by: Arthur Beck
- Succeeded by: Athol Townley

Member of the Tasmanian Legislative Council
- In office 2 May 1933 – 10 July 1943
- Constituency: Hobart

Personal details
- Born: John Francis Gaha; 14 April 1894 Narrabri, New South Wales
- Died: 18 March 1966 (aged 71) Hobart, Tasmania, Australia
- Party: Labor
- Spouse: Ruth Cockayne (m. 1946)
- Education: National University of Ireland
- Occupation: Doctor

John Francis "Stymie" Gaha (14 April 1894 – 18 March 1966) was an Australian politician. Born in Narrabri, New South Wales, he was educated at St Joseph's College in Sydney and the National University of Ireland, becoming a doctor and a house surgeon in Dublin. Returning to Australia in 1920, he settled in Tasmania, where he established a private practice at Hobart; he was a health officer 1925–1929. In 1933, he was elected as a Labor member to the Tasmanian Legislative Council for Hobart, serving as Minister for Health 1934–1943. In 1943, he transferred to federal politics, winning the House of Representatives seat of Denison by defeating sitting United Australia Party MP Arthur Beck. He retired from federal politics in 1949, returning to Tasmanian politics as a member for Denison in the House of Assembly in 1950. He was chief secretary, Minister for Health, Minister for Police and Minister for Transport at various times between 1959–1961. Gaha left the Assembly in 1964 and died two years later in 1966.

== Personal life ==
Gaha was born on 14 April 1894 in Narrabri, New South Wales. His parents Abraham and Eva Gaha were Lebanese Catholics who married immediately before their immigration to Australia in 1892. They spoke little English and had no apparent ties with Australia before leaving Lebanon. According to Alexander Alam, another Lebanese Australian whose parents immigrated in similar circumstances, Gaha's father was originally from the town of Zahlé.

Gaha's father was naturalised as a British subject in 1897 and in the same year won nearly £700 (equivalent to $120,000 in 2022) in a Tattersall's sweepstake. Having earlier run an oyster bar in Quirindi, he became a successful horse-breeder and acquired extensive rural landholdings before eventually retiring to Sydney. Gaha was raised on his family's farming properties. He was home-schooled until the age of thirteen, when he was sent to Sydney to attend St Joseph's College, Hunters Hill.

== Medical career ==
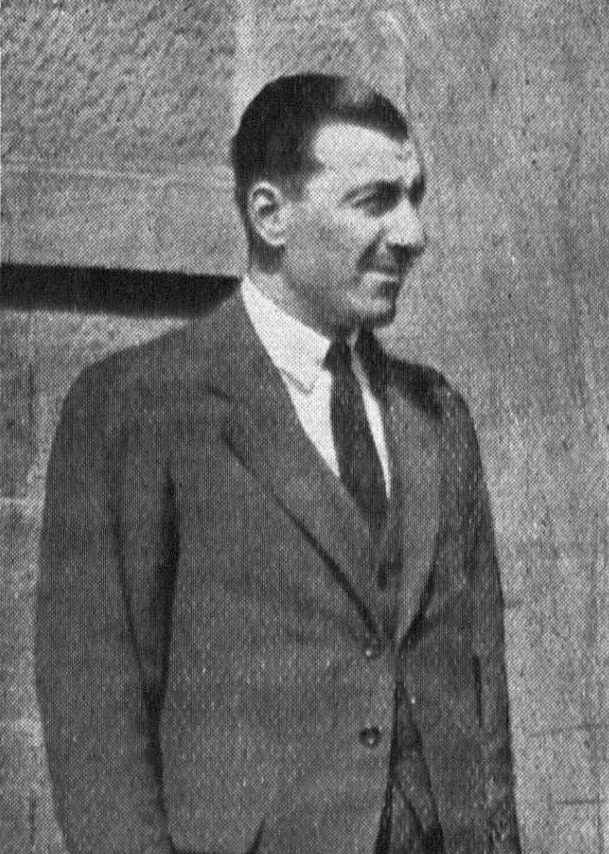
Photograph of Gaha included in his 1928 pamphlet An Epic of the Sea

Gaha completed his medical training in Ireland, studying at Trinity College Dublin and University College Dublin. He graduated MB BCh BAO and was admitted to Membership of the Royal Colleges of Surgeons and as a Licentiate of the Royal College of Physicians. He completed his residency at hospitals in Dublin, including the Rotunda Hospital. Gaha returned to Australia in 1920, working his way home as the medical officer aboard a merchant steamer sailing to Singapore. In 1928 he published An Epic of the Sea, a brief account of his voyage home through Asian ports.

In 1921, Gaha moved to Tasmania to work as a health officer for the Hydro-Electric Department, the government agency overseeing the state's expanding hydroelectric power scheme. He was stationed in construction camps in remote areas and was frequently called upon to treat electric shocks. According to the department's head John Butters, there was only a single death among the electrocuted workers treated by Gaha.

Gaha left the Hydro-Electric Department after a year to establish a private practice as a general practitioner in Hobart. At the time of his arrival there was rift in Tasmania's small medical community between practitioners in the public hospital system and those affiliated with the local branch of the British Medical Association (BMA), who were generally opposed to socialised medicine. In 1923, Gaha accepted a position as an "honorary" (unpaid consultant) at Hobart General Hospital, working under Victor Ratten. He also volunteered at the tuberculosis sanatorium at New Town.

Gaha developed close ties with the ALP government led by state premier Joseph Lyons. He was appointed to the council of the University of Tasmania in 1925 and in 1927 joined the Department of Health as a part-time assistant health officer on a salary of £500 per year (equivalent to $45,000 in 2022). He was the most senior medical professional within the small department, as the departmental head had no medical qualification. In the same year he was also appointed as Tasmania's delegate to the Federal Health Council.

In 1930, Gaha visited Cape Barren Island and produced a report on the island's Aboriginal Tasmanian population. His position of assistant health officer was eliminated the following year as a result of expenditure cuts during the Great Depression.

== Federal politics, 1943–1949 ==
Gaha resigned from the Legislative Council on 10 July 1943 in order to contest the House of Representatives seat of Denison at the 1943 federal election. He won a clear victory in Denison as part of a nationwide landslide victory for the ALP, defeating the incumbent United Australia Party MP Arthur Beck and former Labor MP Gerald Mahoney who stood as an independent.

Tasmanian Legislative Council
Preceded by James McKenzie	Member for Hobart; 1933–1943; Served alongside: Propsting/Strutt, Eady	Succeeded by Arthur Tyler
Parliament of Australia
Preceded by Arthur Beck	Member for Denison; 1943–1949	Succeeded by Athol Townley
