= Grubb's Tramway (Mowbray) =

Coordinates: 41.3178°S 147.2218°E

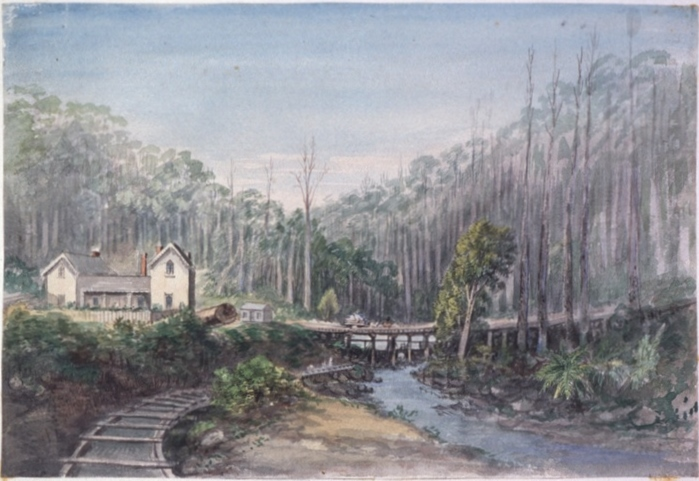
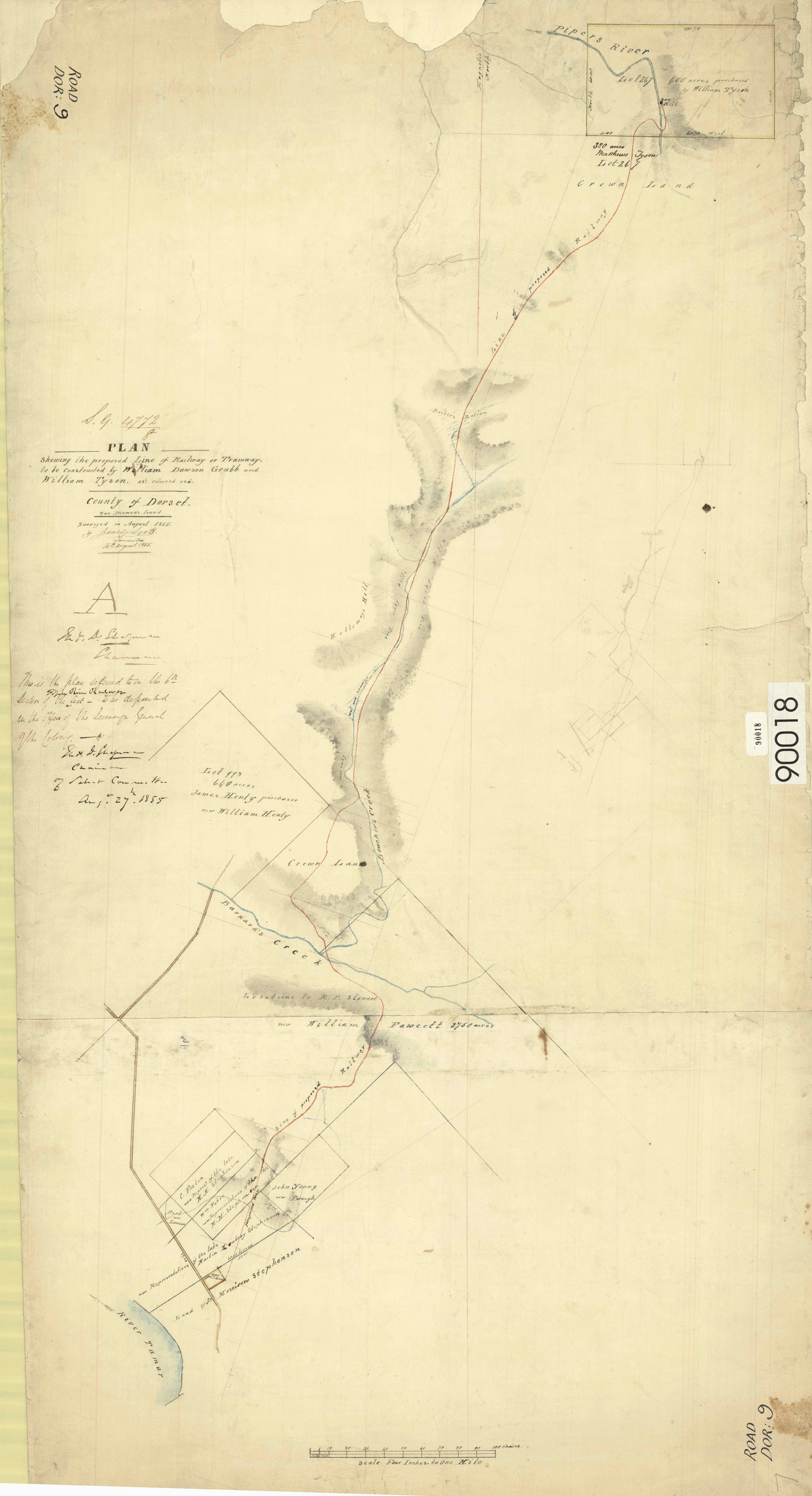
- Tyson's saw mills (1858) by Fred Strange (1807–1874) "Plan showing the proposed line of railway or tramway to be constructed by William Dawson Grubb and William Tyson, as colored red. County of Dorset, Van Diemen's Land. Surveyed in August 1855 by James Scott, Launceston 16 August 1855."

Grubb's Tramway was a partially completed, private logging tram line in Tasmania from the junction of the Launceston-George Town Road at the Tamar River near Mowbray to a saw mill at Pipers River.

== History ==
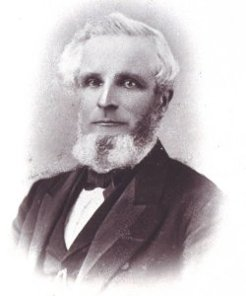
William Dawson Grubb (1817–1879)

The tram was built by William Dawson Grubb (1817–1879). He was born in London and became an attorney, politician and entrepreneur. In March 1832 he emigrated to Van Diemen's Land (now Tasmania). He built a saw mill at Pipers River in partnership with William Tyson.

In August 1855, James Scott surveyed the proposed line of the tramway to be constructed by William Dawson Grubb and William Tyson. A private Act was passed in 1855 to permit the building of a tramway from the junction of the Launceston-George Town Road at Mowbray to the saw mill at Pipers River, but before the line was completed the timber market had declined and the project did not succeed. Similarly his investments in mining were often unfortunate and he was reputed to have lost over £50,000 in timber, gold, coal and railway investments. However, his New Native Youth and Tasmania gold mines were profitable and appear to have compensated largely for his losses in other directions. The Tasmania mine has paid dividends of over £700,000 by 1900.
