= Charles Hall (Australian politician) =

Australian politician

Charles Henry Hall (1851 – 4 November 1922) was an Australian politician.

He was born in Melbourne. In 1897 he was elected to the Tasmanian House of Assembly as the member for Waratah. In 1903 he stood for Burnie and was defeated, but in 1909 he was elected to the Tasmanian Legislative Council as the member for Russell. He was defeated in 1921 and died in Burnie the following year.

Tasmanian Legislative Council
Preceded by William Moore	Member for Russell; 1909–1921	Succeeded by Frank Edwards
