= Alfred Page (Australian politician) =

Australian politician (1843–1911)

Alfred Page (26 December 1843 – 3 November 1911) was an Australian politician. He was born at Oatlands, Tasmania. In 1887 he was elected to the Tasmanian Legislative Council as the member for Macquarie, serving until his retirement in 1909. Page died in Hobart in 1911.

Tasmanian Legislative Council
Preceded by James Agnew	Member for Macquarie; 1887–1909	Succeeded by Alfred Youl
