= William Strutt (politician) =

Australian politician

William Henry Strutt (6 March 1878 – 5 March 1948) was an Australian politician.

He was born in Melbourne. In 1938 he was elected to the Tasmanian Legislative Council as an independent member for Hobart. In 1946 the seat, which had had three members, was divided and Strutt was assigned the seat of Queenborough. Appointed Chair of Committees in 1946, he died in Hobart in 1948.

Tasmanian Legislative Council
Preceded by William Propsting	Member for Hobart; 1938–1946; Served alongside: Eady, Gaha/Tyler/Lonergan	Succeeded by John Soundy
New seat	Member for Queenborough; 1946–1948	Succeeded by Henry Baker
