= Alfred Youl =

Australian politician (1849–1921)

Alfred Youl (23 August 1849 – 3 February 1921) was an Australian politician. He was a member of the Tasmanian House of Assembly for Longford from 1903 to 1909 and a member of the Tasmanian Legislative Council for Macquarie from 1909 to 1920.

Youl was born into a prominent Tasmanian family at the family home, Symmons Plains Estate, near Perth. His family moved to Surrey in England in 1854, and he was educated at St Aubin's School in Jersey and Uppingham School in Leicestershire. He married Margaret Mansell in 1875, after which they returned to Tasmania and acquired the notable Leighlands property, near Perth. Youl thereafter became a grazier and prominent community figure, serving as a member (1884–1898) and five-time Warden of the Evandale Municipal Council, member (1898–1916) and Warden of the Longford Municipal Council, a member of the Perth Road Trust for over three decades, including a stint as trust chairman, chairman of the Longford Court of Petty Sessions, a justice of the peace, special magistrate for old age pensions and a member of the licensing bench and local board of health. Margaret Youl died in 1888, and he married Annette Francis Wigan in 1891.

He was elected to the House of Assembly in 1903 and re-elected in 1906. His House of Assembly seat was abolished from the 1909 election, and he contested and won the Legislative Council seat of Macquarie instead. He served until his defeat by George Pitt in 1920.

He died at Leighlands, in 1921, and was buried in Perth.

Tasmanian Legislative Council
Preceded by Alfred Page	Member for Macquarie; 1909–1920	Succeeded by George Pitt
