= Arthur Fenton (Australian politician) =

Australian politician (1882–1962)

Arthur Benjamin Fenton (21 October 1882 – 13 June 1962) was an Australian politician.

He was born in Wynyard, Tasmania, the son of Charles Fenton, a member of the Tasmanian House of Assembly. In 1933 he was elected to the Tasmanian Legislative Council as the independent member for Russell. He served until his retirement in 1957, whereupon he was succeeded by his nephew, also named Charles. He died in Devonport in 1962.

Tasmanian Legislative Council
Preceded by Frank Edwards	Member for Russell; 1933–1957	Succeeded by Charles Fenton
