= Leslie Procter =

Australian politician

Leslie Procter MBE

Member of Tasmanian Legislative Council for South Esk
- In office 1939 – 1962
- Preceded by: Alan Wardlaw
- Succeeded by: Lloyd Carins

Personal details
- Born: Leslie Arthur Procter; 17 January 1884 Lefroy, Tasmania
- Died: 21 April 1968 (aged 84) Launceston, Tasmania
- Party: Independent
- Occupation: Coachbuilder

Leslie Arthur Procter MBE (27 January 1884 – 21 April 1968) was an Australian politician.

He was born in Lefroy, Tasmania, son of Frederick and Sarah Procter (née Palmer). In 1939, with his occupation listed as coachbuilder, he was elected to the Tasmanian Legislative Council as the independent member for South Esk. He held the seat until his retirement in 1962. Procter died in Launceston in 1968, aged 84.

Tasmanian Legislative Council
Preceded by Alan Wardlaw	Member for South Esk; 1939–1962	Succeeded by Lloyd Carins
