= Arthur Cutts =

Australian politician

Arthur Thomas Cutts (20 March 1879 – 12 September 1967) was an Australian politician.

He was born in Sassafras. In 1937 he was elected to the Tasmanian Legislative Council as the independent member for Tamar. He served until his retirement in 1955. Cutts died in Northdown in 1967.

Tasmanian Legislative Council
Preceded by Ernest Freeland	Member for Tamar; 1937–1955	Succeeded by Neil Campbell
