= Richard McKenzie (Tasmanian politician) =

Australian politician

Richard John Stevenson McKenzie (6 March 1850 – 13 October 1919) was an Australian politician.

He was born in Launceston, Van Diemen's Land. In 1906 he was elected to the Tasmanian House of Assembly as the Anti-Socialist member for North Esk. With the introduction of proportional representation in 1909 he was elected as one of the six members for Bass. He held the seat until he was defeated in 1913, but later that year he was elected to the Tasmanian Legislative Council as the independent member for Westmorland. He held the seat until his death in Launceston in 1919.

Tasmanian Legislative Council
Preceded by John Cheek	Member for Westmorland; 1913–1919	Succeeded by John Cheek
