= William Williams (Tasmanian politician) =

Australian politician

William Micah Williams (24 May 1851 – 11 August 1924) was an Australian politician, commonly referred to as W. M. Williams. He was born in New Norfolk, Van Diemen's Land. In 1916 he was elected to the Tasmanian Legislative Council as the Independent member for Hobart, serving until his defeat in 1922. Williams died in Hobart in 1924.

Tasmanian Legislative Council
| Preceded by Thomas Murdoch | Member for Hobart; 1916–1922; Served alongside: Propsting, Bond/Murdoch | Succeeded by James Chapman |
