= John Stopp =

Australian politician (1933–2014)

Eric John Chancellor Stopp (10 June 1933 – 19 April 2014) was an Australian politician.

He was born on Norfolk Island in 1933 and moved to Tasmania as a boy. He attended The Hutchins School, in Hobart. In 1983 he was elected to the Tasmanian Legislative Council as the independent member for Queenborough. He was President of the Council from 1992 to 1995. Stopp retired from politics in 1995.

Tasmanian Legislative Council
Preceded by George Shaw	President of the Tasmanian Legislative Council; 1992–1995	Succeeded by Reg Hope
Preceded by Bill Hodgman	Member for Queenborough; 1983–1995	Succeeded by Jim Wilkinson
