= Frank Bond (politician) =

Australian politician

Frank Bond (1856 – 15 December 1931) was an Australian politician.

He was born in Longford, Tasmania. In 1903 he was elected to the Tasmanian House of Assembly as the member for East Hobart. He was defeated in 1906, but in 1909 was elected to the Legislative Council as one of the members for Hobart. He served until his defeat in 1921.

Tasmanian Legislative Council
| Preceded by William Crosby | Member for Hobart; 1909–1921; Served alongside: Butler/Murdoch/Williams, Propsting | Succeeded by Thomas Murdoch |
