= Gamaliel Butler =

Australian politician

Gamaliel Henry Butler (5 June 1854 – 15 July 1914) was an Australian politician.

He was born in Hobart. In 1896 he was elected to the Tasmanian Legislative Council representing Hobart. He was Chief Secretary from 1909 until his death in 1914.

Tasmanian Legislative Council
Preceded by Alexander McGregor	Member for Hobart; 1896–1914; Served alongside: Crosby/Bond, Grant/Gibson/Propsting	Succeeded by Thomas Murdoch
