= John Hope (Australian politician) =

Australian politician (1842–1926)

John Hope (23 July 1842 – 12 May 1926) was a Scottish-born Tasmanian politician.

He was born in Aberdeen. In 1900 he was elected to the Tasmanian House of Assembly as the member for Devonport. He transferred to Kentish in 1903 and in 1909, with the introduction of proportional representation, he was elected as an Anti-Socialist member for the seat of Wilmot. In 1911 he resigned from the House of Assembly to successfully contest the Legislative Council seat of Meander. He served as Chair of Committees from 1921 until his death in Sheffield in 1926.

Tasmanian Legislative Council
Preceded by Frederick Grubb	Member for Meander; 1911–1926	Succeeded by Hubert Nichols
