= Hank Petrusma =

Australian politician

Hank Petrusma OAM

Member of the Tasmanian Legislative Council for Hobart
- In office 22 May 1982 – January 1992
- Preceded by: Kath Venn
- Succeeded by: Jean Moore

Personal details
- Born: Hendrick Petrusma; 26 December 1942 (age 83) Haren, Groningen, Netherlands
- Party: Independent
- Occupation: Real estate agent

Hendrik "Hank" Petrusma OAM (born 26 December 1942) is an Australian former politician. Dutch-born, he was an independent member of the Tasmanian Legislative Council from 1982 to 1992, representing Hobart. He resigned in 1992 to run for the House of Assembly in Denison, but was defeated.

In the 2026 Australia Day Honours, Petrusma was awarded the Medal of the Order of Australia for "service to the Parliament of Tasmania, to the real estate industry, and to the community".

Tasmanian Legislative Council
Preceded by Kath Venn	Member for Hobart; 1982–1992	Succeeded by Jean Moore
