= William Moore (Australian politician) =

Australian politician (1823–1914)

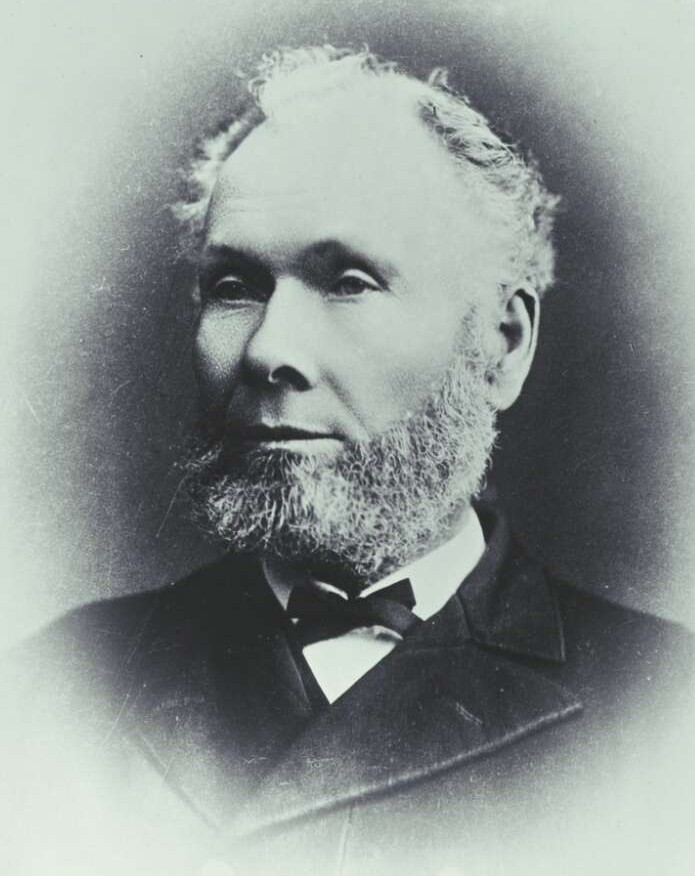
William Moore in the 1898 Australasian Federal Convention Album.

William Moore (26 August 1823 – 9 August 1914) was an Australian politician, President of the Tasmanian Legislative Council from 1889 to 1894.

Moore was born on the Isle of Man. In 1871 he was elected to the Tasmanian House of Assembly as the member for Wellington, serving until 1877, when he transferred to the Legislative Council, winning the seat of Mersey. Moore was Minister of Lands and Works in the Alfred Kennerley Ministry from August 1873 to July 1876, and Colonial Secretary in the Philip Fysh and William Giblin Governments from August 1877 to March 1878. From October 1879 to August 1884 he held the same position in Giblin's second Ministry.

Moore transferred to the Upper House seat of Russell in 1885 and was President of the Council from 1889 to 1894. Moore retired in 1909; he died in Hobart on 9 August 1914.

Tasmanian Legislative Council
Preceded by Walter Gellibrand	President of the Tasmanian Legislative Council; 1889–1894	Succeeded by Adye Douglas
Preceded by William Hawkes	Member for Mersey; 1877–1885	Succeeded by James Smith
New seat	Member for Russell; 1885–1909	Succeeded by Charles Hall
