= Charles Henry Grant =

Australian politician and engineer

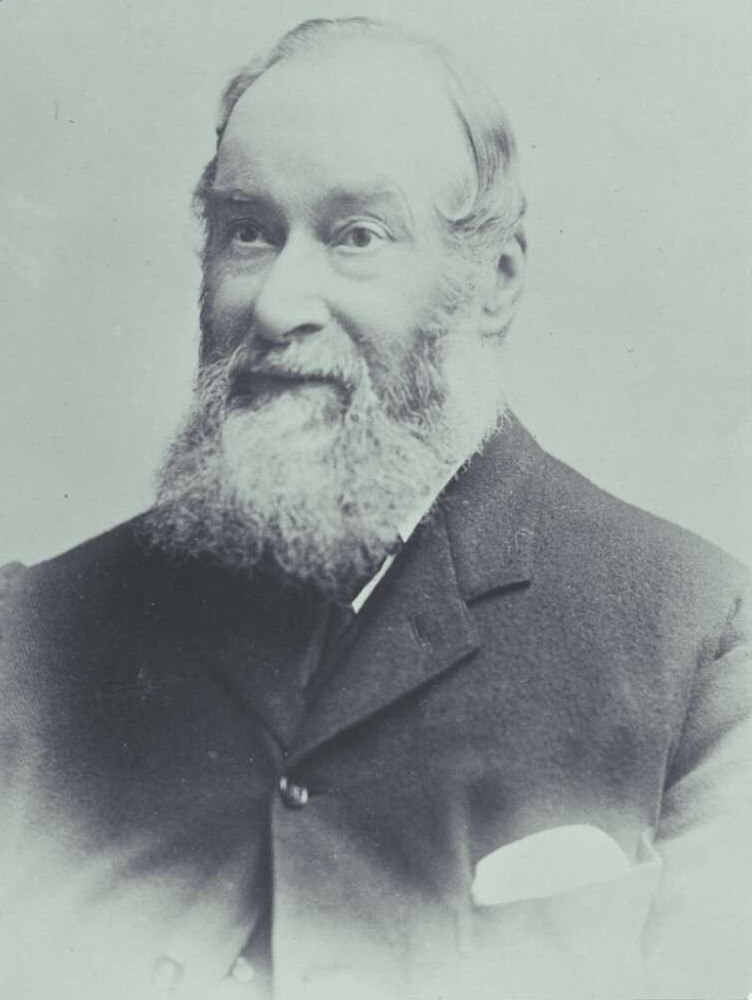
Charles Henry Grant at the 1898 Australasian Federal Convention.

Charles Henry Grant (9 November 1831 – 30 September 1901) was an engineer and politician in the Colony of Tasmania. He was a member of the Tasmanian Legislative Council from 1892 until his death.

Grant was born in Great Marlow, Buckinghamshire, England, and was educated at King's College, London.

He was engineer-in-chief and general manager of the Tasmanian Main Line Railway. In June 1892 he was elected to the Tasmanian Legislative Council for the Hobart division in a by-election following the death of George Salier. In August 1892 he accepted office without portfolio in the Dobson Ministry.

Grant died in Hobart on 30 September 1901. His son Charles William Grant was a state government minister and federal senator.
