= George Pitt (Australian politician) =

Australian politician (1872–1932)

George Henry Pitt (1 December 1872 – 16 April 1932) was an Australian politician.

He was born in Longford, Tasmania. In 1920 he was elected to the Tasmanian Legislative Council as the independent member for Macquarie. He served until his death in Launceston in 1932.

Tasmanian Legislative Council
Preceded by Alfred Youl	Member for Macquarie; 1920–1932	Succeeded by Albert Bendall
