= James Murdoch Jr. =

Australian politician

James Murdoch (28 December 1886 – 27 October 1935) was an Australian politician.

He was born in Cambridge, Tasmania, the son of James Murdoch, who was also a Tasmanian politician. In 1925 he succeeded his father as the independent member for Pembroke in the Tasmanian Legislative Council. He held the seat until his death in 1935, whereupon he was succeeded by his elder brother John.

Tasmanian Legislative Council
Preceded by James Murdoch, Sr.	Member for Pembroke; 1925–1935	Succeeded by John Murdoch
