= Albert Bendall =

Australian politician (1884–1967)

Albert William Bendall (29 May 1884 – 3 May 1967) was an Australian politician.

He was born in Westbury, Tasmania. In 1922 he was elected to the Tasmanian House of Assembly as a Country Party member for Wilmot, although he soon joined the Nationalists when the Country Party in Tasmania disintegrated. He was defeated in 1925, but in 1932 he was elected to the Tasmanian Legislative Council as the independent member for Macquarie. He held the seat until his defeat in 1944. Bendall died in 1967 in New Norfolk.

Tasmanian Legislative Council
Preceded by George Pitt	Member for Macquarie; 1932–1944	Succeeded by Compton Archer
