= George Collins (Australian politician) =

Australian politician

George Thomas Collins CMG (10 May 1839 – 25 August 1926) was an Australian politician.

He was born in Launceston, the son of William Collins. He was educated at the Launceston Church Grammar School.

Collins joined the family of Douglas when his mother married the lawyer Sir Adye Douglas. Collins was articled under Douglas before joining his law firm in 1861, thereafter known as Douglas and Collins. The firm remains one of the oldest law firms in Australia. In 1895, he was elected to the Tasmanian Legislative Council as the member for Tamar. He served until his retirement in 1919 and died in Launceston in 1926.

Collins was also involved in a diverse number of Launceston organisations and was a director of several companies, including the Launceston Chamber of Commerce, Turf Club, Tamar Rowing Club, Northern Fisheries Association and Chairman of the Northern Tasmanian Division of the Red Cross Society.

Collins was made a Companion of the Order of St Michael and St George (CMG) in the 1919 Birthday Honours.

Tasmanian Legislative Council
Preceded by Audley Coote	Member for Tamar; 1895–1919	Succeeded by Ernest Freeland
