= Frederick Grubb (politician) =

Australian politician (1844–1923)

Frederick William Grubb (16 October 1844 – 28 April 1923) was an Australian politician.

He was born in Launceston, the eldest son of William Dawson Grubb. In 1879 he was elected to the Tasmanian Legislative Council as the member for Tamar, replacing the previous member—his father—who had died. In 1880 his seat was declared vacant due to absence. In 1881 he returned to the council as the member for Meander, the seat he represented until his retirement in 1911. Grubb died in Launceston in 1923.

Tasmanian Legislative Council
Preceded by William Dawson Grubb	Member for Tamar; 1879–1880; Served alongside: James Aikenhead	Succeeded by John Scott
Preceded by Thomas Field	Member for Meander; 1881–1911	Succeeded by John Hope
