= James Murdoch Sr. =

Australian politician

James Murdoch (4 July 1851 – 29 May 1925) was an Australian politician.

He was born in Hobart, Van Diemen's Land. In 1903 he was elected to the Tasmanian Legislative Council as the independent member for Pembroke. He served until his death in Cambridge in 1925, when he was succeeded by his son James. Another son, John, would also later represent the seat.

Tasmanian Legislative Council
Preceded by William Perkins	Member for Pembroke; 1903–1925	Succeeded by James Murdoch, Jr.
