= Ernest Freeland =

Australian politician

Ernest William Freeland (12 January 1870 – 22 November 1940) was an Australian politician. Born in Carrick, Tasmania, he was elected to the Tasmanian Legislative Council in 1919 as the member for Tamar, serving until 1937. He died in 1940 at Beaconsfield.

Tasmanian Legislative Council
Preceded by George Collins	Member for Tamar; 1919–1937	Succeeded by Arthur Cutts
