= Alan Wardlaw =

Australian politician

Alan Lindsay Wardlaw (23 July 1887 – 24 December 1938) was an Australian politician.

He was born in Avoca, Tasmania. When 24 years of age he took over management of Mineral Banks, a farm near Ringarooma, In 1920 he was elected to the Tasmanian Legislative Council as the independent member for South Esk. He was Chair of Committees from 1920 to 1928. He held the seat until his death in 1938.

Tasmanian Legislative Council
Preceded by Arthur Loone	Member for South Esk; 1920–1938	Succeeded by Leslie Procter
