= Charles Eady =

Australian cricketer

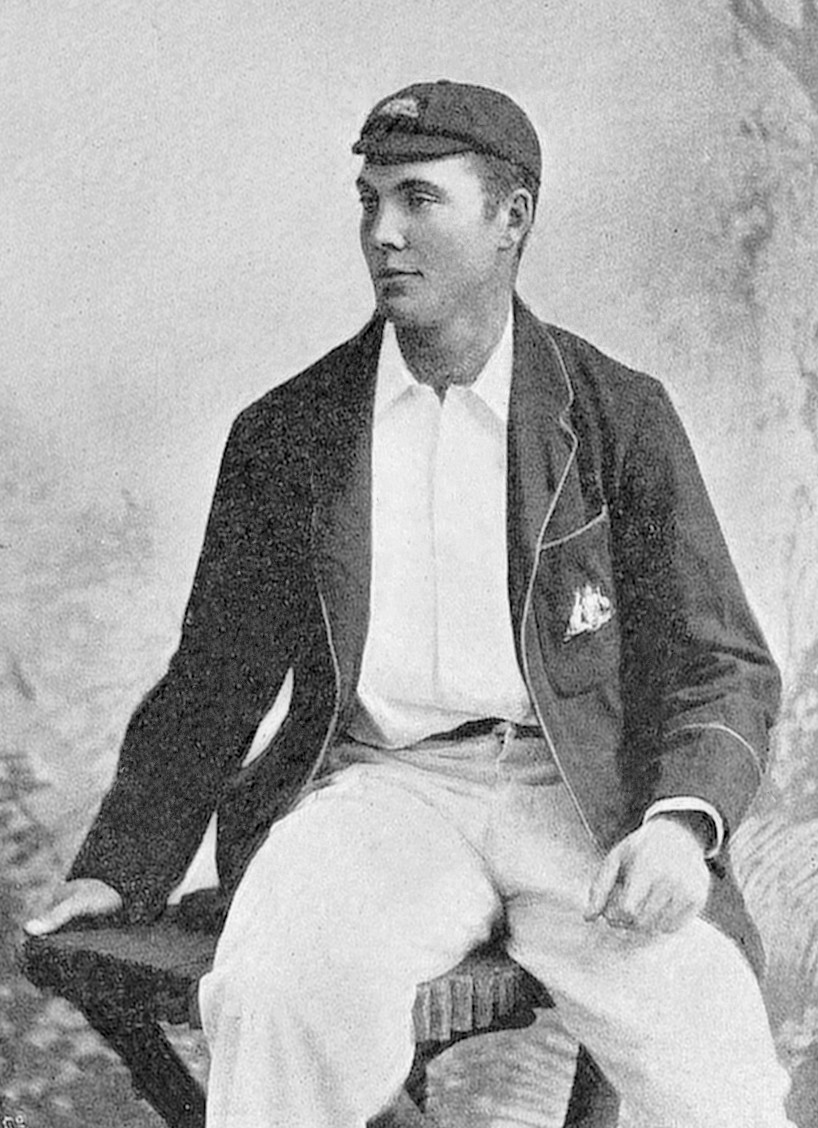

Cricket information
- Batting: Right-handed
- Bowling: Right-arm fast

International information
- National side: Australia
- Test debut (cap 73): 22 June 1896 v England
- Last Test: 28 February 1902 v England

Career statistics
Competition	Test	First-class
Matches	2	43
Runs scored	20	1,490
Batting average	6.66	22.92
100s/50s	0/0	3/6
Top score	10*	116
Balls bowled	223	6,562
Wickets	7	136
Bowling average	16.00	23.13
5 wickets in innings	0	12
10 wickets in match	0	5
Best bowling	3/30	8/34
Catches/stumpings	2/–	45/–
- Source: Cricinfo, 12 October 2022

Charles John Eady (29 October 1870 – 20 December 1945) was an Australian sportsman, lawyer and politician.

== Life and career ==
Eady was a cricketer who played for Tasmanian clubs and representative sides in the era before Tasmania was accepted into the Sheffield Shield and other competitions. He also played in Test cricket twice for Australia becoming the only cricketer to play his only two test matches, one in the 19th century and one in the 20th century.

A big man, standing six feet three inches or 1.90 metres tall, Eady was an all-rounder: a hard-hitting right-handed batsman and a right-arm fast bowler. He made 116 and 112 not out for Tasmania against Victoria in 1895 and was picked for the tour to England in 1896. But he failed to do himself justice, scoring just 12 runs in the Lord's Test match, though he picked up four fairly cheap wickets. He made one more Test appearance in 1901–2, again with little success.

Eady's chief claim to being remembered is a remarkable innings played in a club match between the Tasmanian club Break o' Day and the Wellington club, which was another Tasmanian team and not the current side from New Zealand, in 1902, when he scored 566 from a total of 911. (Note: Team score given as 908 in Wisden 1946 but other sources such as CricketArchive and The Cricketer record it as 911.) This is the third highest score in any form of cricket, behind Pranav Dhanawade's 1009 not out in 2016 and A. E. J. Collins' 628 not out in 1899. Eady also took all 10 wickets for 42 runs in an innings for South Hobart versus East Hobart in 1906.

Eady later served as president of the Australia Board of Control, later Cricket Australia and was also President of the Tasmanian Legislative Council from 1944 to 1945.

Eady was also an outstanding Australian rules football player, and served two terms totalling 25 years as President of the Tasmanian Football League.

On 23 October 1903 he married Florence Guesdon in Hobart. She was the daughter of William Guesdon. When he died on 20 December 1945 he was survived by daughter, his wife having died nine months earlier.

== Notes ==
Tasmanian Legislative Council
Preceded by Thomas Murdoch	President of the Tasmanian Legislative Council; 1944–1945	Succeeded by Rupert Shoobridge
Preceded by James Chapman	Member for Hobart; 1925–1945; Served alongside: Propsting/Strutt, Murdoch/McKenzie/Gaha/Tyler/Lonergan	Succeeded by John Soundy
