= Tetley Gant =

Australian politician (1853–1928)

Tetley Gant, CMG (9 July 1853 – 7 February 1928) was an Australian barrister, Tasmanian politician and chancellor.

== Early life – England ==
Caricature by David Low

Tetley was born in Manningham, Yorkshire, England to James Greaves Tetley Gant, (1815–1873), a Bradford solicitor, and Sarah Ann Gaunt. He attended Rugby School and St John's College, in Oxford.

== Career – Australia ==
In 1884, Gant migrated to Australia and settled in Hobart. His legal qualifications allowed him to enter the Supreme Court of Tasmania and in 1888, Gant started a legal partnership with Sir Neil Elliott Lewis.

Gant was elected to the seat of Buckingham in the Tasmanian Legislative Council in May 1901, retaining it until August 1927. Gant was appointed to the council for the University of Tasmania in 1905 and in 1909, he succeeded Sir Neil Elliott Lewis as Vice-Chancellor and in 1914, he was appointed Chancellor, succeeding Sir John Stokell Dodds.

In 1902, Gant became president of the Amateur Horticultural Society of Hobart and in 1910 he was elected the founding President of the Buckingham Rowing and Swimming Club and then in 1913 he was appointed president of the Tasmanian Club.

== Personal life ==
Tetley married Frances Amy Roope, daughter of Lavington Roope, on 19 July 1882 at St John's Church, New Town, Tasmania.

Gant died on 7 February 1928 at Lower Sandy Bay, Tasmania.

His wife Frances was also very active and started the Queen Mary Club, a social club for ladies in Hobart, on 4 July 1910.

Tasmanian Legislative Council
Preceded by William Dodery	President of the Tasmanian Legislative Council; 1907–1926	Succeeded by William Propsting
Preceded by Frederick Piesse	Member for Buckingham; 1901–1927	Succeeded by Thomas Murdoch
