= William Propsting =

Australian politician

William Propsting CMG
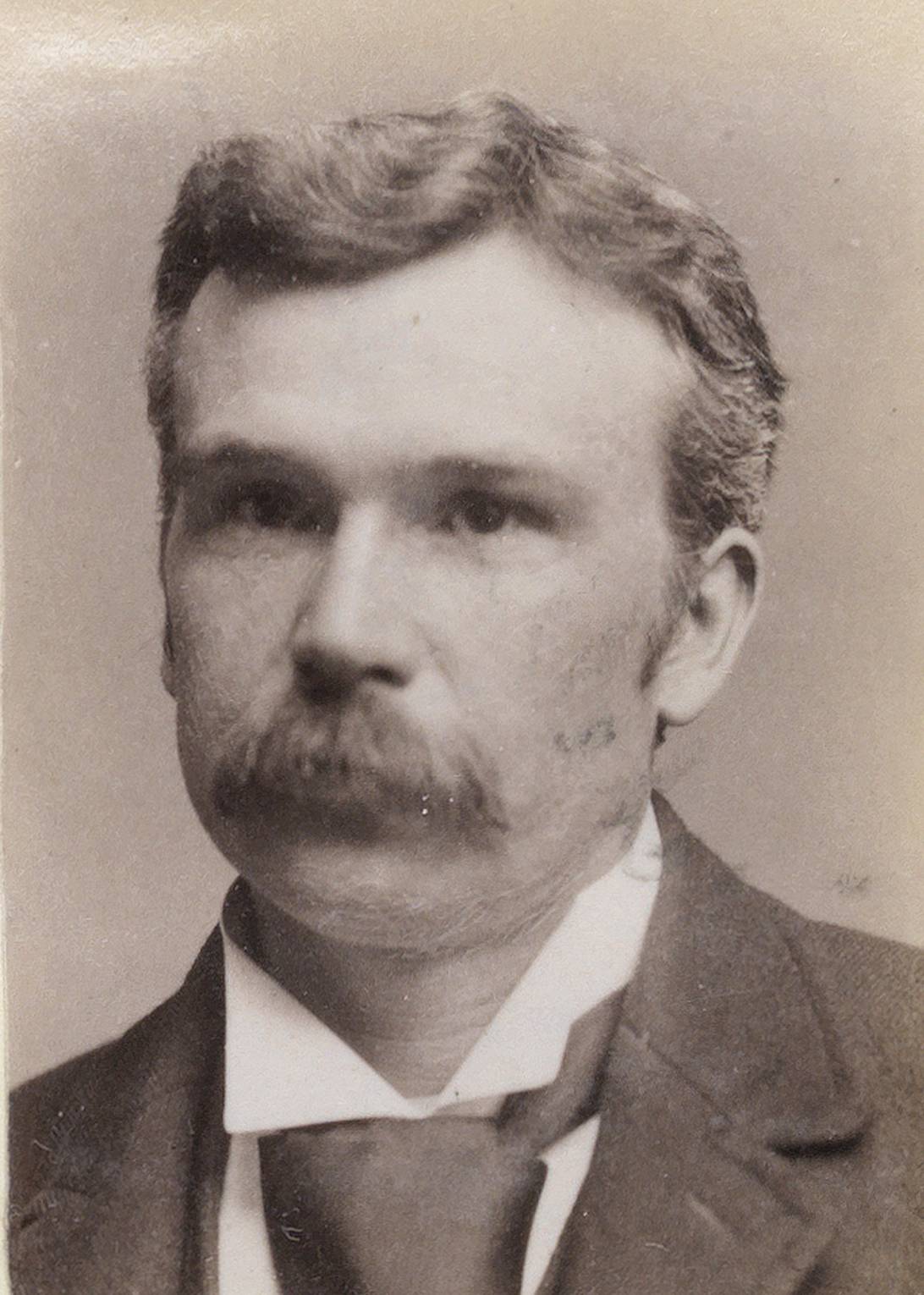

20th Premier of Tasmania
- In office 9 April 1903 – 11 July 1904
- Governor: Sir Arthur Havelock
- Preceded by: Elliott Lewis
- Succeeded by: John Evans

Personal details
- Born: William Bispham Propsting; 4 June 1861 Hobart, Tasmania
- Died: 3 December 1937 (aged 76) Hobart, Tasmania, Australia
- Party: Liberal Democratic Party
- Spouse(s): Caroline Emma Coles (1893–1923); Lilias Anne Macfarlane (1925–1937)
- Profession: Lawyer

William Bispham Propsting, CMG (4 June 1861 – 3 December 1937) was an Australian lawyer and politician. He served as premier of Tasmania from 1903 to 1904. He was a member of the parliament of Tasmania for over 35 years and also served terms as Attorney-General of Tasmania and president of the Tasmanian Legislative Council.

== Early life ==
Propsting was born in Hobart on 4 June 1861. He was the son of Hannah (née Cater) and Henry Propsting. His father had been transported to Van Diemen's Land as a convict in 1831 for stealing geese. He went on to become a successful merchant and an alderman of the City of Hobart, also reputedly fathering 26 children.

Propsting attended the Derwent School in Hobart run by F. V. Norman. He moved to South Australia in 1879 and began working as a pupil-teacher. He attended the Teachers' Training College and University of Adelaide. He subsequently taught at the Sturt Street School in Adelaide and the state schools in Kapunda and Burra. In 1886, Propsting return to Hobart and commenced studying law as an articled clerk under C. H. Elliston and C. E. Featherstone. He was admitted to the bar in 1892.

== Personal life ==
In 1893, Propsting married Caroline Emma Coles, the daughter of South Australian politician Sir Jenkin Coles, despite her father's initial disapproval. The couple had three children. He was widowed in 1923 and remarried in 1925 to Lilias Macfarlane. He died at his home in Hobart on 3 December 1937, aged 76.

Political offices
Preceded by Elliott Lewis	Premier of Tasmania; 1903 – 1904	Succeeded by John Evans
Tasmanian Legislative Council
Preceded by Tetley Gant	President of the Tasmanian Legislative Council; 1926–1937	Succeeded by Thomas Murdoch
Preceded by William Gibson	Member for Hobart; 1905–1937; Served alongside: Crosby/Bond/Murdoch/McKenzie/Gaha, Butler/Murdoch/Williams/Chapman/Eady	Succeeded by William Strutt
