= Thomas Murdoch (politician) =

Australian politician

Thomas Murdoch CMG (15 March 1868 – 29 June 1946) was an Australian politician in Tasmania.

Murdoch was born in Hobart.

In 1914 he was elected to the Tasmanian Legislative Council as an independent member for Hobart. Defeated in 1916, he was re-elected in 1921 and held the seat until 1927, when he transferred to the seat of Buckingham. He was appointed Chair of Committees in 1932 and elected President of the Council in 1937. For this service he was appointed a Companion of the Order of St Michael and St George (CMG).

In 1928, Murdoch moved unsuccessfully in the Legislative Council that Tasmania should secede from the rest of Australia.

He was defeated in 1944 and died in Hobart in 1946.

Tasmanian Legislative Council
Preceded by William Propsting	President of the Tasmanian Legislative Council; 1937–1944	Succeeded by Charles Eady
Preceded by Gamaliel Butler	Member for Hobart; 1914–1916; Served alongside: Frank Bond, William Propsting	Succeeded by William Williams
Preceded by Frank Bond	Member for Hobart; 1921–1927; Served alongside: Propsting, Williams/Chapman/Eady	Succeeded by James McKenzie
Preceded by Tetley Gant	Member for Buckingham; 1927–1944	Succeeded by Bill Wedd
