= John Cheek =

Australian politician

John William Cheek, CBE (15 February 1855 – 26 February 1942) was an Australian politician, who was an Independent member of the Tasmanian Legislative Council representing the electoral division of Westmorland on two occasions from 1907 to 1913, and then from 1919 until his death in 1942.

Cheek was made a Commander of the Order of the British Empire (CBE) on 2 January 1939, for public service in Tasmania.

Tasmanian Legislative Council
| Preceded by William Dodery | Member for Westmorland; 1907–1913 | Succeeded by Richard McKenzie |
| Preceded by Richard McKenzie | Member for Westmorland; 1919–1942 | Succeeded by George Flowers |
