= Electoral division of Tamar =

Former electoral division of the Tasmanian Legislative Council

The Electoral division of Tamar was an electoral division in the Tasmanian Legislative Council of Australia. It existed from 1856 to 1997, when it was renamed Roland.

== Members ==
Two members (1856–1885)
Member	Party	Period	Member	Party	Period
William Button	Independent	1856–1863	William Henty	Independent	1856–1862
William Button	Independent	1856–1863	Sir Richard Dry	Independent	1862–1869
Thomas Corbett	Independent	1863–1865	Sir Richard Dry	Independent	1862–1869
Charles Weedon	Independent	1865–1866	Sir Richard Dry	Independent	1862–1869
Isaac Sherwin	Independent	1866–1869	Sir Richard Dry	Independent	1862–1869
William Grubb	Independent	1869–1879	William Hutchins	Independent	1869–1870
William Grubb	Independent	1869–1879	James Aikenhead	Independent	1870–1885
Frederick Grubb	Independent	1879–1880	James Aikenhead	Independent	1870–1885
John Scott	Independent	1880–1885	James Aikenhead	Independent	1870–1885

Single member (1885–1997)
Member	Party	Period
John Scott	Independent	1885–1886
Audley Coote	Independent	1886–1895
George Collins	Independent	1895–1919
Ernest Freeland	Nationalist	1919–1937
Arthur Cutts	Independent	1937–1955
Neil Campbell	Liberal	1955–1960
Daniel Hitchcock	Independent	1960–1979
Reg Hope	Independent	1979–1982
Jeff Coates	Independent	1982–1989
John Loone	Independent	1989–1997

== See also ==
- Tasmanian Legislative Council electoral divisions
