= Electoral division of Macquarie =

Former Tasmanian Legislative Council electoral division

The Electoral division of Macquarie was an electoral division in the Tasmanian Legislative Council of Australia. It existed from 1886 to 1999, when it was abolished since the Council was reduced from 19 to 15 seats. It took its name from former New South Wales Governor Lachlan Macquarie.

== Members ==
Member	Party	Period
James Agnew	Independent	1886–1887
Alfred Page	Independent	1887–1909
Alfred Youl	Independent	1909–1920
George Pitt	Independent	1920–1932
Albert Bendall	Independent	1932–1944
Compton Archer	Independent	1944–1950
Thomas Cheek	Independent	1950–1968
George Shaw	Independent	1968–1998
Russell Anderson	Independent	1998–1999

== See also ==
- Tasmanian Legislative Council electoral divisions
