= Electoral division of Westmorland =

Former electoral division of the Tasmanian Legislative Council

The Electoral division of Westmorland was an electoral division in the Tasmanian Legislative Council of Australia. It existed from 1885 to 1999, when it was renamed Windermere.

== Members ==
Member	Party	Period
William Dodery	Independent	1885–1907
John Cheek	Independent	1907–1913
Richard McKenzie	Independent	1913–1919
John Cheek	Independent	1919–1942
George Flowers	Independent	1942–1958
Oliver Gregory	Independent	1959–1985
Darryl Chellis	Independent	1985–1991
George Brookes	Independent	1991–1997
Silvia Smith	Independent	1997–1999

== See also ==
- Tasmanian Legislative Council electoral divisions
