= Electoral division of Russell =

Former electoral division of the Tasmanian Legislative Council

The electoral division of Russell was an electoral division in the Tasmanian Legislative Council of Australia. It existed from 1885 to 1999, when it was renamed Murchison.

== Members ==
Member	Party	Period
William Moore	Independent	1885–1909
Charles Hall	Independent	1909–1921
Frank Edwards	Independent	1921–1933
Arthur Fenton	Independent	1933–1957
Charles Fenton	Independent	1957–1981
Tony Fletcher	Independent	1981–1999

== See also ==
- Tasmanian Legislative Council electoral divisions
