= Electoral division of Buckingham =

Former Tasmanian Legislative Council electoral division

The electoral division of Buckingham was an electoral division in the Tasmanian Legislative Council of Australia. It was abolished in 1999 after the Legislative Council was reduced from 19 members to 15. The then sitting member, David Crean, was allocated as the member for Elwick.

== Members ==
Member	Party	Period
Thomas Lowes	Independent	1856–1870
Philip Fysh	Independent	1870–1873
Thomas Chapman	Independent	1873–1884
Philip Fysh	Independent	1884–1894
Frederick Piesse	Independent	1894–1901
Tetley Gant	Independent	1901–1927
Thomas Murdoch	Independent	1927–1944
Bill Wedd	Independent	1944–1948
James Connolly	Labor	1948–1968
Ken Lowrie	Independent	1968–1986
Doug Lowe	Independent	1986–1992
David Crean	Independent	1992–1993
David Crean	Labor	1993–1999

== See also ==
- Buckingham Land District
- Tasmanian Legislative Council electoral divisions
