= Electoral division of Meander =

Former electoral division of the Tasmanian Legislative Council

The Electoral division of Meander was an electoral division in the Tasmanian Legislative Council of Australia. It existed from 1856 to 1997, when it was renamed Leven.

== Members ==
Member	Party	Period
William Nairn	Independent	1856–1869
Alexander Clerke	Independent	1869–1871
John Thomson	Independent	1871–1875
Thomas Field	Independent	1875–1881
Frederick Grubb	Independent	1881–1911
John Hope	Independent	1911–1926
Hubert Nichols	Independent	1926–1935
Percy Best	Independent	1935–1943
Elliot Lillico	Independent	1943–1958
Charles Best	Independent	1958–1962
Charles Best	Country	1962–1965
Charles Best	Independent	1965–1971
Jeff Coates	Independent	1971–1982
Reg Hope	Independent	1982–1997

== See also ==
- Tasmanian Legislative Council electoral divisions
