= Electoral division of South Esk =

Former Tasmanian Legislative Council electoral division

The Electoral division of South Esk was an electoral division in the Tasmanian Legislative Council of Australia. It existed from 1856 to 1999, when it was renamed Apsley. It took its name from the South Esk River.

== Members ==
Member	Party	Period
Philip Smith	Independent	1856–1858
Philip Gell	Independent	1858–1862
Frederick Innes	Independent	1862–1872
James Scott	Independent	1872–1877
Frederick Innes	Independent	1877–1882
Charles Leake	Independent	1882–1884
Adye Douglas	Independent	1884–1886
James Gibson	Independent	1886–1899
Robert Scott	Independent	1899–1909
Christopher O'Reilly	Independent	1909–1910
Arthur Loone	Independent	1910–1920
Alan Wardlaw	Independent	1920–1938
Leslie Procter	Independent	1939–1962
Lloyd Carins	Independent	1962–1980
Dick Archer	Independent	1980–1992
Colin Rattray	Independent	1992–1999

== See also ==
- Tasmanian Legislative Council electoral divisions
