= Electoral division of Hobart =

Tasmanian Legislative Council electoral division

Hobart Tasmania—Legislative Council
- Map showing the electoral division of Hobart, as of the 2017 periodic review.
- State: Tasmania
- Dates current: 1865–1999, 2008–present
- MP: Cassy O'Connor
- Party: Greens
- Electors: 24,007 (January 2019)
- Area: 62 km^{2} (23.9 sq mi)
- Demographic: Inner-metropolitan
- Federal electorate(s): Clark
- Coordinates: 42.895°S 147.278°E
Electorates around Hobart:
Elwick	Elwick	River Derwent
Elwick; Huon	Hobart	River Derwent
Huon	Nelson	Nelson

The electoral division of Hobart is one of the 15 electoral divisions in the Tasmanian Legislative Council. It was originally created in 1856 when the Council became the upper house of the Parliament of Tasmania. The seat was abolished in 1999 and re-created in 2008 after a redistribution saw the former Division of Wellington returned to its former name.

The total area of the division is 62.29 square kilometres (24.05 sq mi), which covers the Hobart central business district and the suburbs of Battery Point, Dynnyrne, Fern Tree, Glebe, Lenah Valley, Mount Stuart, New Town, North Hobart, Ridgeway, South Hobart and West Hobart.

As of 31 January 2019, there were 24,007 enrolled electors in the division.

From 2012 to 2024, the member in the Legislative Council was Independent MLC Rob Valentine, who was the Lord Mayor of Hobart from 1999 to 2011. The last election in the division was in May 2024. Cassy O'Connor was elected.

== Members for Hobart ==
=== First incarnation ===
==== Three members (1856–1946) ====
Member	Party	Term	Member	Party	Term	Member	Party	Term
Edward Bedford	Independent	1856–1859	Thomas Horne	Independent	1856–1860	John Walker	Independent	1856–1859
William Carter	Independent	1859–1865	Thomas Horne	Independent	1856–1860	James Wilson	Independent	1859–1880
William Carter	Independent	1859–1865	John Wedge	Independent	1860–1866	James Wilson	Independent	1859–1880
Alfred Kennerley	Independent	1865–1877	John Wedge	Independent	1860–1866	James Wilson	Independent	1859–1880
Alfred Kennerley	Independent	1865–1877	Philip Fysh	Independent	1866–1869	James Wilson	Independent	1859–1880
Alfred Kennerley	Independent	1865–1877	William Crowther	Independent	1869–1885	James Wilson	Independent	1859–1880
James Agnew	Independent	1877–1881	William Crowther	Independent	1869–1885	James Wilson	Independent	1859–1880
James Agnew	Independent	1877–1881	William Crowther	Independent	1869–1885	Alexander McGregor	Independent	1880–1896
Thomas Smart	Independent	1881–1886	William Crowther	Independent	1869–1885	Alexander McGregor	Independent	1880–1896
Thomas Smart	Independent	1881–1886	William Crosby	Independent	1885–1909	Alexander McGregor	Independent	1880–1896
George Salier	Independent	1886–1892	William Crosby	Independent	1885–1909	Alexander McGregor	Independent	1880–1896
Charles Grant	Independent	1892–1901	William Crosby	Independent	1885–1909	Alexander McGregor	Independent	1880–1896
Charles Grant	Independent	1892–1901	William Crosby	Independent	1885–1909	Gamaliel Butler	Independent	1896–1914
William Gibson	Independent	1901–1905	William Crosby	Independent	1885–1909	Gamaliel Butler	Independent	1896–1914
William Propsting	Independent	1905–1937	William Crosby	Independent	1885–1909	Gamaliel Butler	Independent	1896–1914
William Propsting	Independent	1905–1937	Frank Bond	Independent	1909–1921	Gamaliel Butler	Independent	1896–1914
William Propsting	Independent	1905–1937	Frank Bond	Independent	1909–1921	Thomas Murdoch	Independent	1914–1916
William Propsting	Independent	1905–1937	Frank Bond	Independent	1909–1921	William Williams	Independent	1916–1922
William Propsting	Independent	1905–1937	Thomas Murdoch	Independent	1921–1927	William Williams	Independent	1916–1922
William Propsting	Independent	1905–1937	Thomas Murdoch	Independent	1921–1927	James Chapman	Independent	1922–1925
William Propsting	Independent	1905–1937	Thomas Murdoch	Independent	1921–1927	Charles Eady	Independent	1925–1945
William Propsting	Independent	1905–1937	James McKenzie	Independent	1927–1933	Charles Eady	Independent	1925–1945
William Propsting	Independent	1905–1937	Frank Gaha	Labor	1933–1943	Charles Eady	Independent	1925–1945
William Strutt	Independent	1938–1946	Frank Gaha	Labor	1933–1943	Charles Eady	Independent	1925–1945
William Strutt	Independent	1938–1946	Arthur Tyler	Labor	1943–1945	Charles Eady	Independent	1925–1945
William Strutt	Independent	1938–1946	Dennis Lonergan	Independent	1945–1946	Charles Eady	Independent	1925–1945

==== Single-member (1946–1999) ====
Member	Party	Term
John Soundy	Independent	1946–1952
Phyllis Benjamin	Labor	1952–1976
Kath Venn	Labor	1976–1982
Hank Petrusma	Independent	1982–1992
Jean Moore	Independent	1992–1994
Doug Parkinson	Labor	1994–1999

=== Second incarnation (2008–present) ===
Image	Member	Party	Term	Notes
	Doug Parkinson (b. 1945)	Labor	3 May 2008 – 5 May 2012	Former MLC for Wellington. Retired
	Rob Valentine (b. 1950)	Independent	5 May 2012 – 4 May 2024	Former Lord Mayor of Hobart. Retired
	Cassy O'Connor (b. 1967)	Greens	4 May 2024 – present	Former MHA for Clark and former Tasmanian Greens leader. First Greens member of the Tasmanian Legislative Council. Incumbent

== Election results ==
2024 Tasmanian Legislative Council periodic election: Hobart
Party	Candidate	Votes	%	±%
Greens	Cassy O'Connor	7,104	36.86	+36.86
Independent	John Kelly	4,287	22.24	+22.24
Labor	John Kamara	3,578	18.57	+18.57
Independent	Charlie Burton	2,615	13.57	+13.57
Independent	Stefan Vogel	725	3.76	+3.76
Independent	Sam Campbell	522	2.71	+2.71
Independent	Michael Haynes	441	2.29	+2.29
Total formal votes		19,272	97.49	+0.42
Informal votes		497	2.51	–0.42
Turnout		19,769	80.56	+4.14
Registered electors		24,538		
Two-candidate-preferred result
Greens	Cassy O'Connor	11,236	59.70	+59.70
Independent	John Kelly	7,586	40.30	+40.30
Greens gain from Independent				

== See also ==
- Electoral division of Wellington
- Tasmanian House of Assembly
