= Grounds =

Grounds is the plural of ground

Grounds may also refer to:

- Coffee grounds, granulated remains of coffee beans after grinding for coffee
- Grounds, in law, a rational motive or basis for a belief, conviction, or action taken, such as a legal action or argument:
  - Grounds for divorce

== People ==
- Bertie Grounds (1878–1950), Australian cricketer
- Jonathan Grounds (born 1988), English footballer
- Sir Roy Grounds (1905–1981), Australian architect
- Arthur Grounds (1898–1951), Australian politician
- Joan Grounds (1939 – 2010), American-born Australian artist
- Lucy Grounds (1908–1987), Australian politician
- Vernon Grounds (1914–2010), American theologian and evangelical
- William Grounds (1874–1958), New Zealand politician
- Tony Grounds (born 1957), British television scriptwriter
- Housie Grounds (1903–1963), Australian rules footballer

== See also ==
- Groundskeeping, tending an area of land for aesthetic or functional purposes
  - Greenskeeper, a person responsible for the care and upkeep of a golf course
