= The Grind =

The Grind may refer to:

- The Grind (TV series), an MTV dance music show
- The Grind (1915 film), a 1915 silent film
- The Grind (2012 film), a 2012 crime film

== See also ==
- Grind (disambiguation)
