= Ground =

Ground may refer to:

== Geology ==
- Land, the solid terrestrial surface of the Earth
- Soil, a mixture of clay, sand and organic matter present on the surface of the Earth

== Electricity ==
- Ground (electricity), the reference point in an electrical circuit from which voltages are measured
- Earthing system, part of an electrical installation that connects with the Earth's conductive surface
- Ground and neutral, closely related terms

== Law ==
- Ground (often grounds), in law, a rational motive or basis for a belief, conviction, or action taken, such as a legal action or argument:
- Grounds for divorce, regulations specifying the circumstances under which a person will be granted a divorce

== Music ==
- Ground (album), the second album by the Nels Cline Trio
- "Ground" (song), one of the songs in the debut album of the Filipino rock band Rivermaya
- Ground bass, in music, a bass part that continually repeats, while the melody and harmony over it change
- The Ground (album), a 2005 album by Norwegian jazz pianist Tord Gustavsen

== Other ==
- Ground (art), a base for the paint layers of a picture.
- The Ground (film), a 2001 avant-garde film by Robert Beavers
- Coffee grounds, ground up coffee beans
- Ground tissue, one of the three types of tissue systems in a plant
- Ground term, in symbolic logic, a term with no variables
- Ground (unit), a unit of area used in India
- Ground (Dzogchen), the primordial state in Dzogchen
- Ground surface, often on metals, created by various grinding operations
- Ground (cricket), where cricket games are played, and also part of the playing area.

== See also ==
- Grounding (disambiguation)
- Grounded (disambiguation)
- Grounds (disambiguation)
- Earth (disambiguation)
- Grind (disambiguation),
- Ground level (disambiguation)
- Ground of Being (disambiguation)
