= Kaarel Kurismaa =

Estonian artist

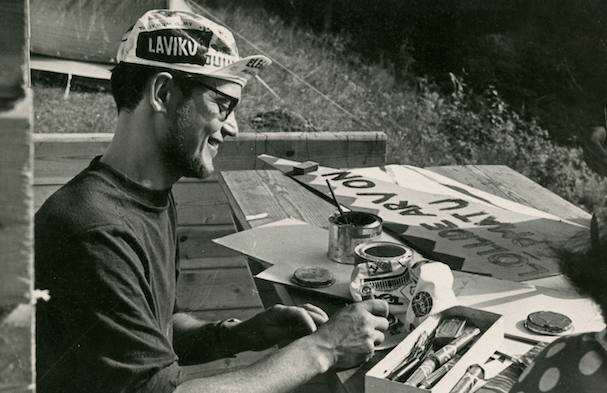
- Kaarel Kurismaa in 1966
- Born: 13 May 1939 (age 87) in Pärnu, Estonia
- Education: Tartu Art School
- Known for: sound art and sound installation
- Spouse: Mari Kurismaa
- Awards: Award of the Cultural Endowment of Estonia (1997); Kristjan Raud Prize (1996); Award of the Cultural Endowment of Estonia (1995)

Kaarel Kurismaa (born 13 May 1939 in Pärnu, Estonia) is the first and one of the most important sound art and sound installation artists in Estonia. His work also expands into the field of painting, animation, public space monumental art, stage installations. In Estonian art history, Kurismaa’s significance lies mostly in the pioneering work with kinetic art and with keeping its traditions alive. Kurismaa stands as one of Estonian sound art scene’s central icons. His idiosyncratic work serves as a foundation for Estonian sound and kinetic art.

== Biography and art ==
Kurismaa was born in Pärnu, but his family soon moved to the capital, Tallinn, where his parents opened a bakery. He was creatively very active from early on, taking part of school orchestra and spending time drawing absurdist comics.

When Kurismaa was not accepted to the music school in 1957 in Tallinn, he decided to enroll in the Tartu Art School. In 1965, Kurismaa started to work as an artist-decorator for the Tallinn Department Store while also commencing studies in monumental painting at the State Art Institute. Work at the Tallinn Department Store (opened in 1960, brand name Tallinna Kaubamaja) offered a variety of ways to experiment with readymade materials and forms, as well as opportunity to exhibit his works in the department store’s exhibitions. His first kinetic object stems from the year 1966 and is also the first kinetic object in Estonian art history. It has not survived, but consisted of a fireplace grid and several kitchen utensils.

His oeuvre combines sound, music, sculpture, painting, literature, drama, monumental art and design in various ways. Kurismaa’s preferred materials like plastic and wood, he liked to reuse furniture details or shapes and boards from construction factories – the very limited outlet of the Soviet time consumer possibilities made all artists very creative in finding the right materials for their artworks, so in the case of Kurismaa. He mostly worked with round, streamlined and exuberant forms – there is hardly any angular geometry apparent in Kurismaa’s works. There is no doubt that popart has strongly influenced Kurismaa’s works in the 1970s.

Kaarel Kurismaa and his objects also play a role in the history of Estonian new music as in the 1970s he collaborated with the cult progressive rock group Mess. Kurismaa has admitted that Finnish television allowed the locals to get an inkling of what was happening in the rest of the world and what else was being done on stage besides playing music. He has recalled a show by Electric Light Orchestra and performances by the jazz rock band Mahavishnu Orchestra – both these groups were established in the early 1970s. Kurismaa was responsible for the stage setting, which consisted of various objects, a light show and photo slides, which enhanced the impact of Mess’s music at concerts and turned their performances nearly ritualistic. Art critics have always looked at Kurismaa’s objects in exhibition context and described them with certain clichés, Mess’s music, however, created a completely different cognitive atmosphere around Kurismaa’s objects.

When the wave of avant-garde died down in the late 1970s, Kurismaa’s priorities also changed. At the beginning of the new decade, he focused on animated children's films, then came commissions for a number of objects for public spaces, such as the Tallinn central post office and the sculpture for the High-voltage Networks of Region North. He was able to realise close to 10 kinetic and/or sound objects for public spaces during the 80s, though all of them have been demolished or lost. This decade was also very fruitful in terms of his painting.

The 1990s saw a new awakening and a significant turn in Kurismaa’s creative life. Once again, he focused on sound, even more so than he had in the 1970s. The aesthetic paradigm of his sound objects also altered to the creation of site-specific sound sculptures and installations. He left aside small objects furtively snuffling in the corners and their soul landscapes, and started to actively interfere with the space with both visual and acoustic means.

== Selected works ==
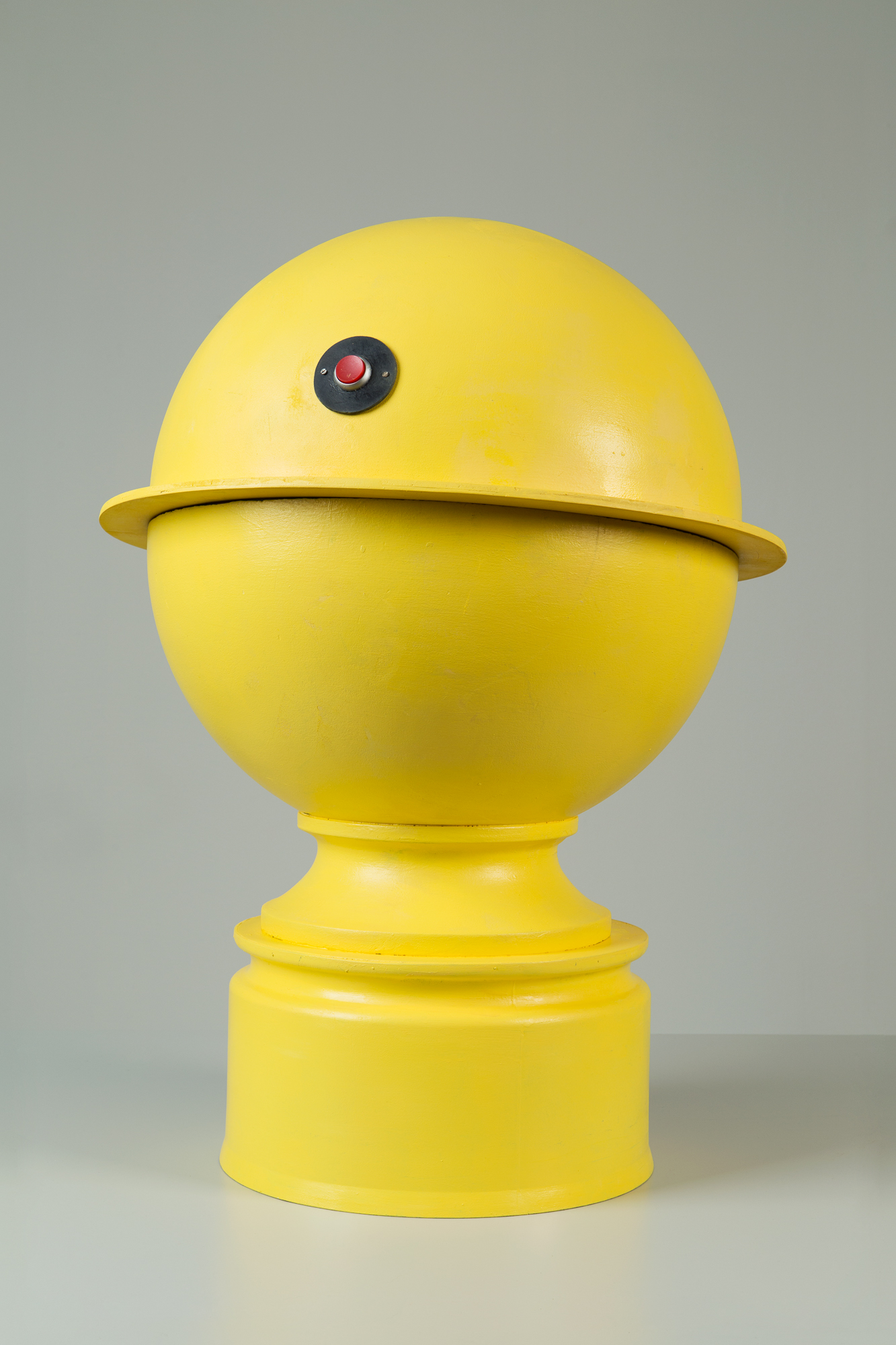
Saturn (2003). An interactive sound object. Ready-made, plastic and electronics 80×60×60

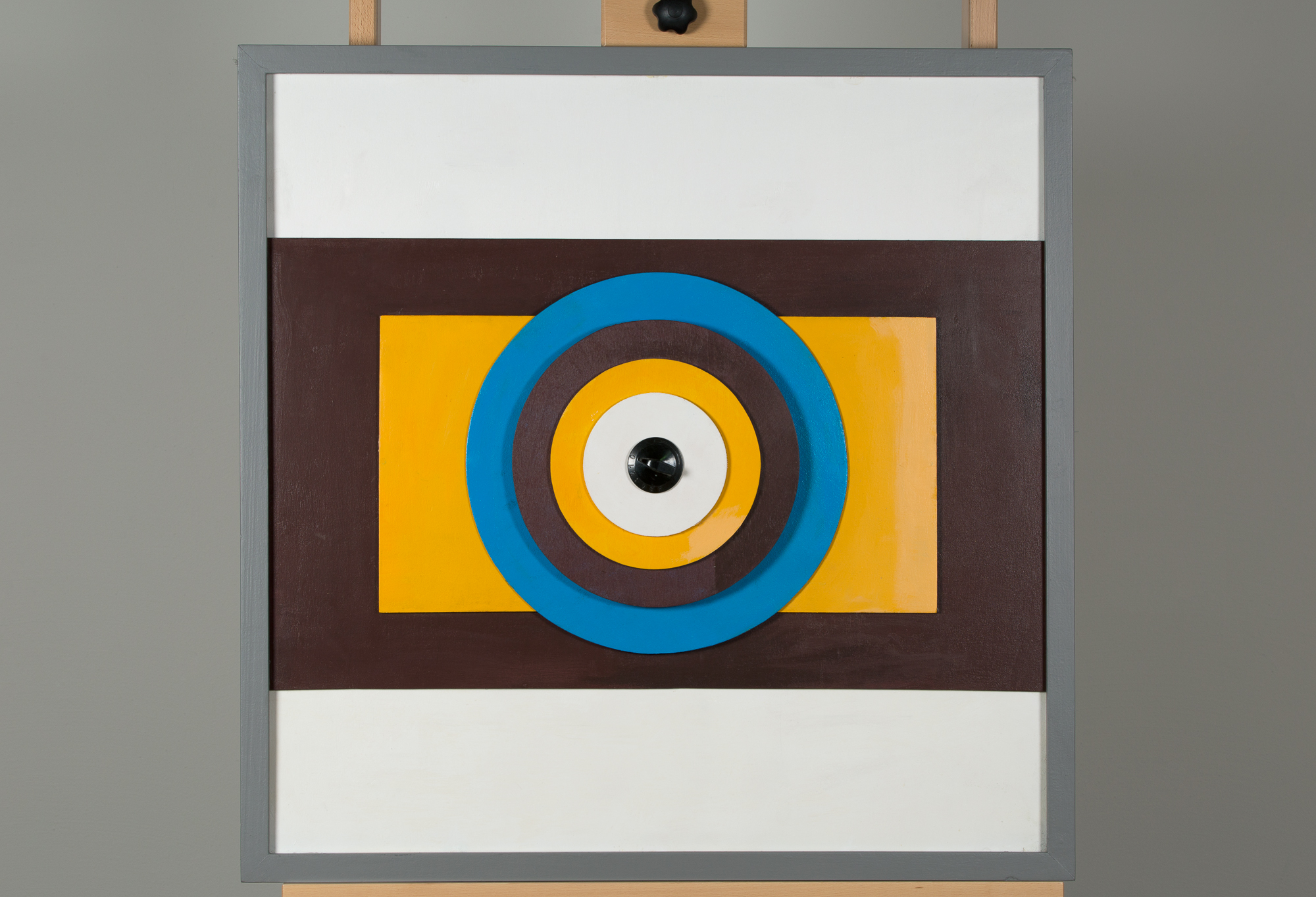
A Timer. An interactive sound object (2016). Ready-made and wood. 90×90

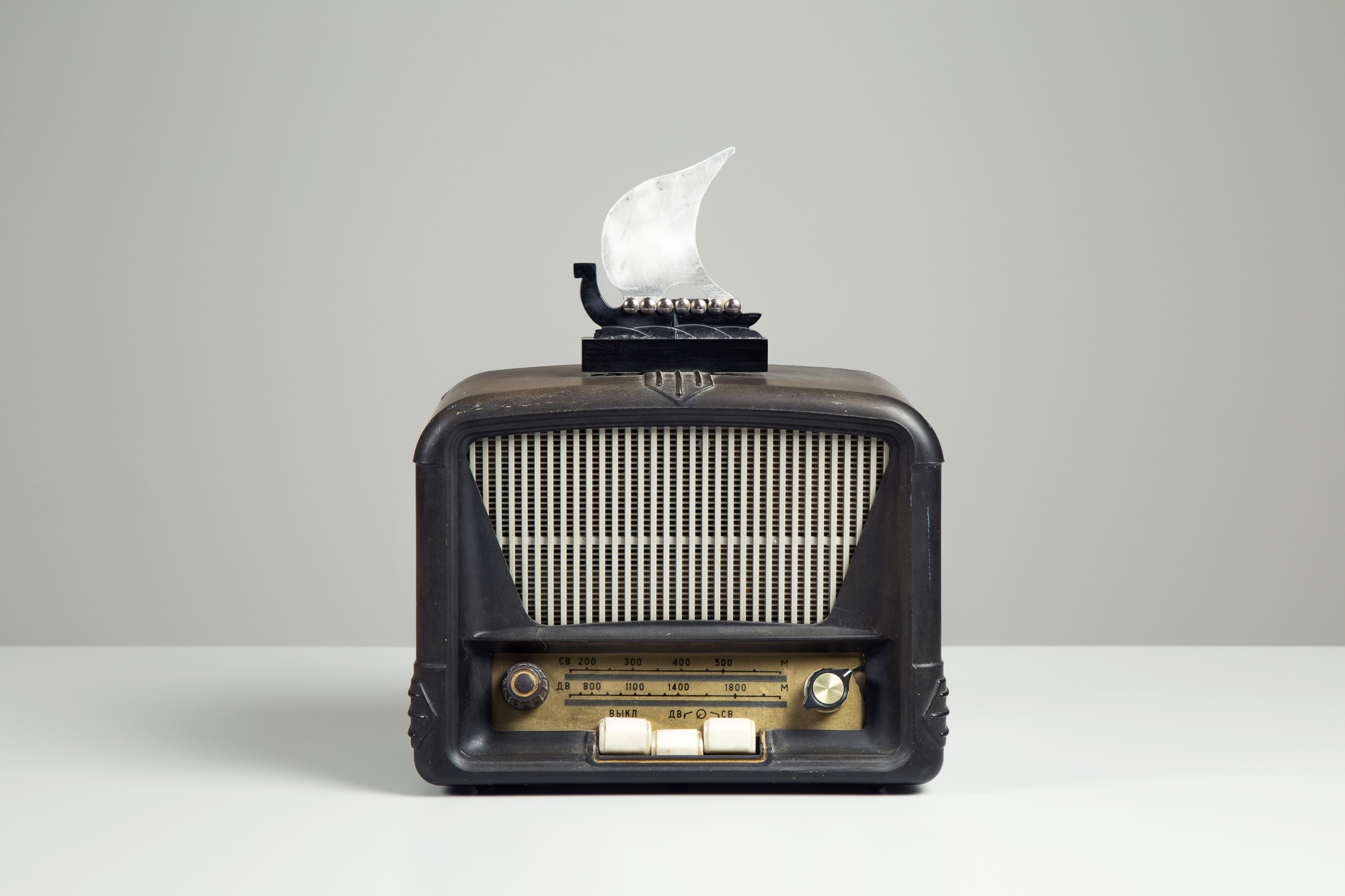
Viking Radio. A sound object (2001–2003). Ready-made, metal, plastic and electronics 34 × 27.5 × 15.5

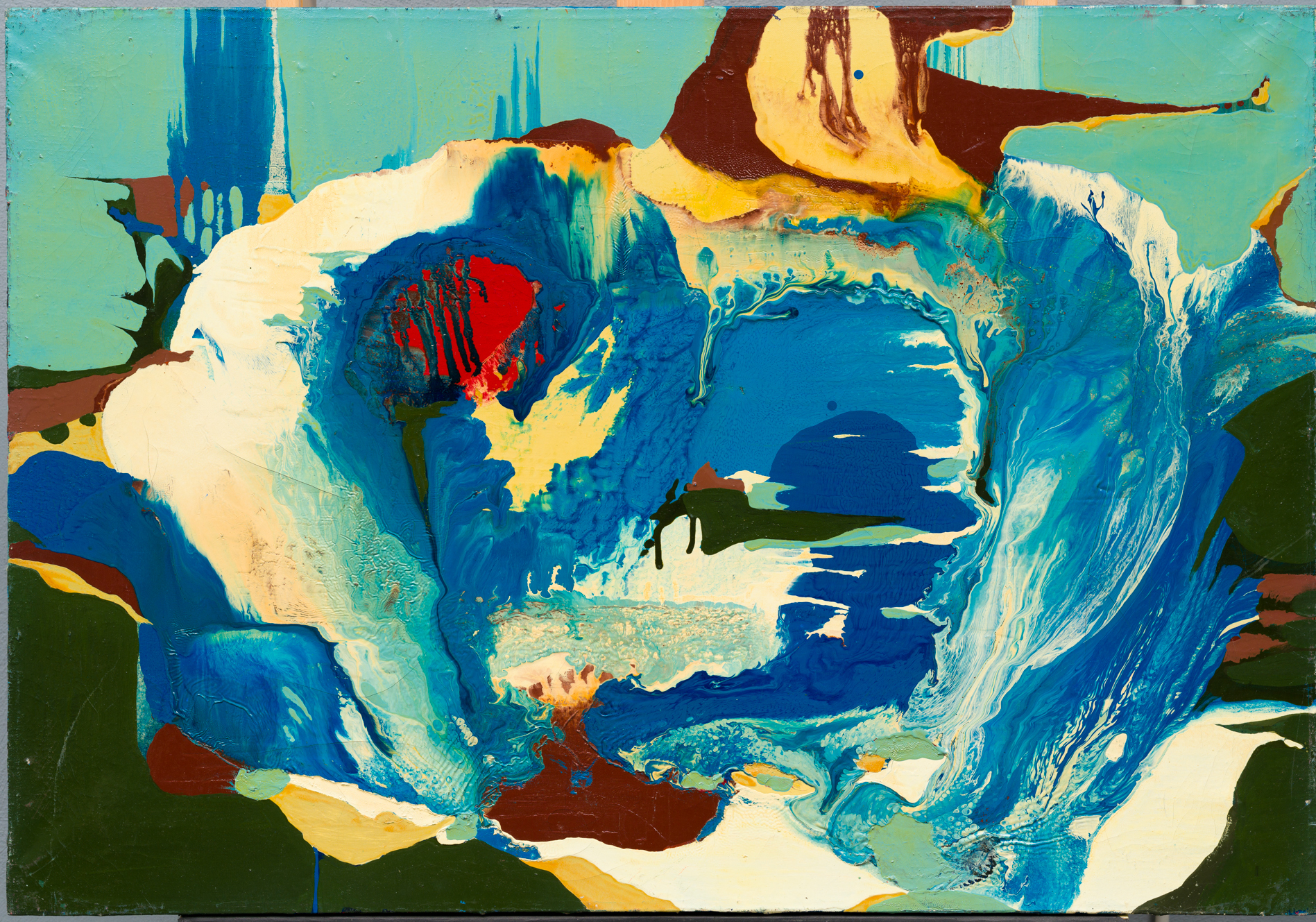
A Current (1975). Enamel on canvas. 81 × 116

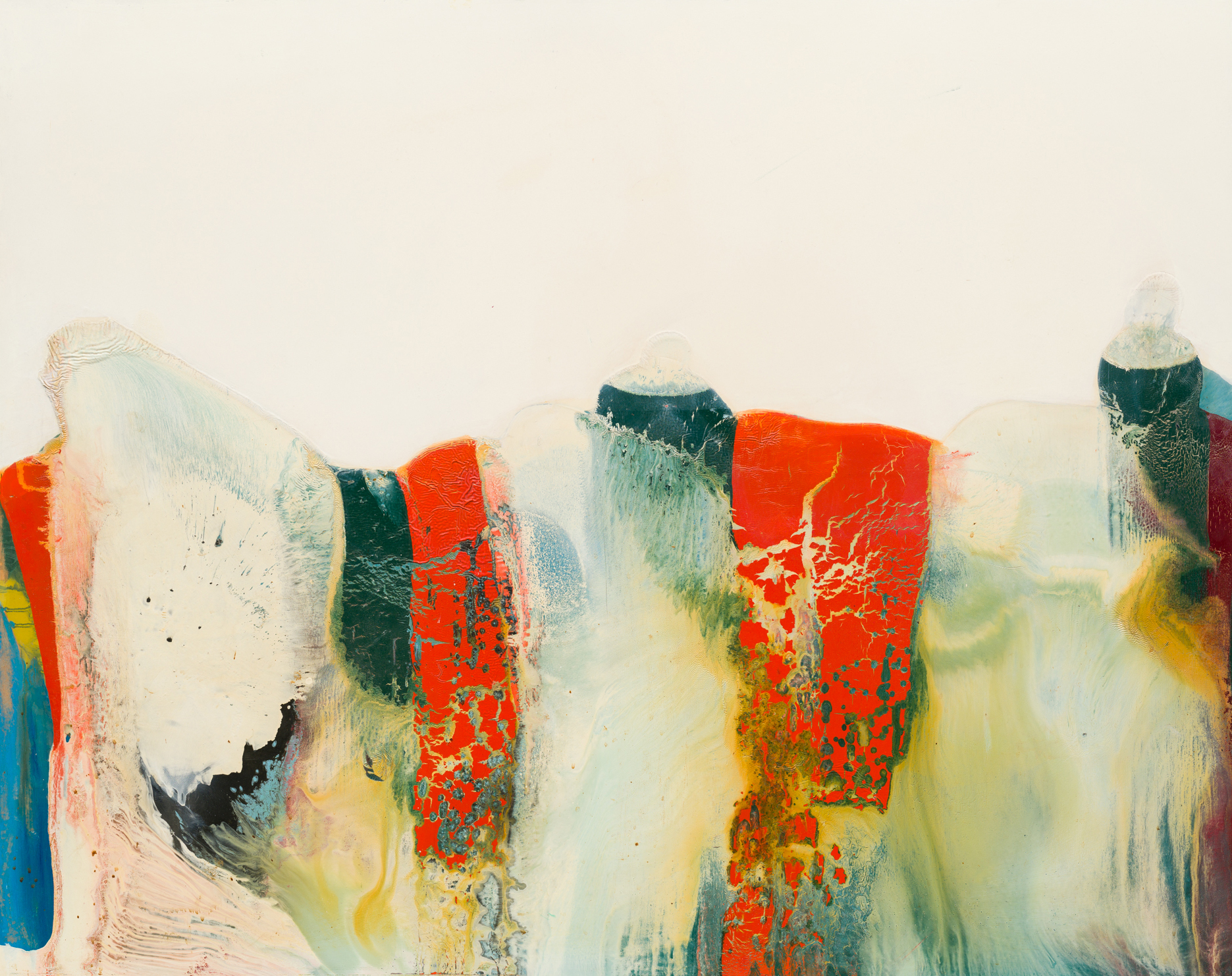
Reflection of Light (1982). Enamel and oil on cardboard 120 × 151

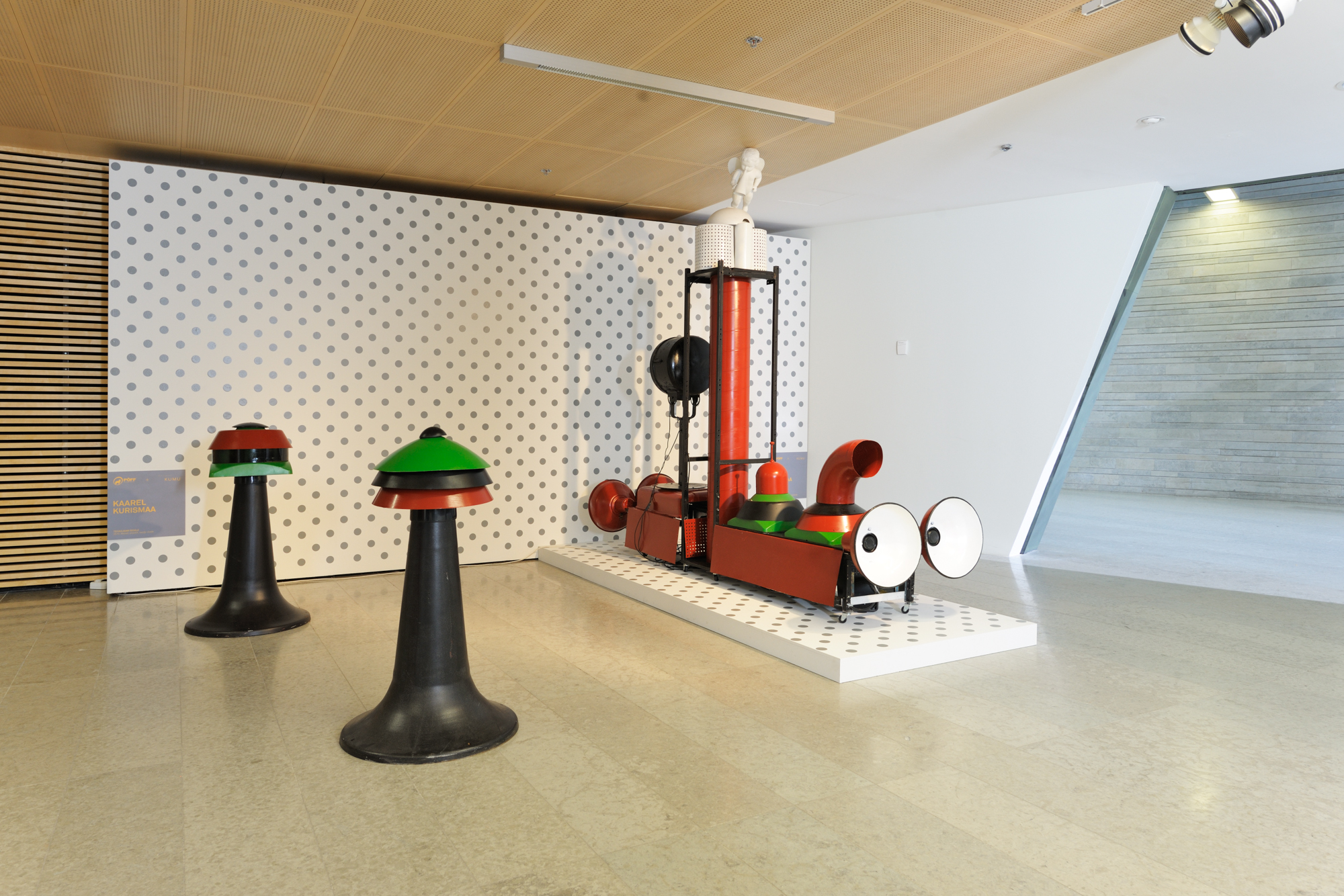
Steam Express and Halts (1993/2010). Metal, plastic and a ready-made. Varying dimensions Courtesy of the artist

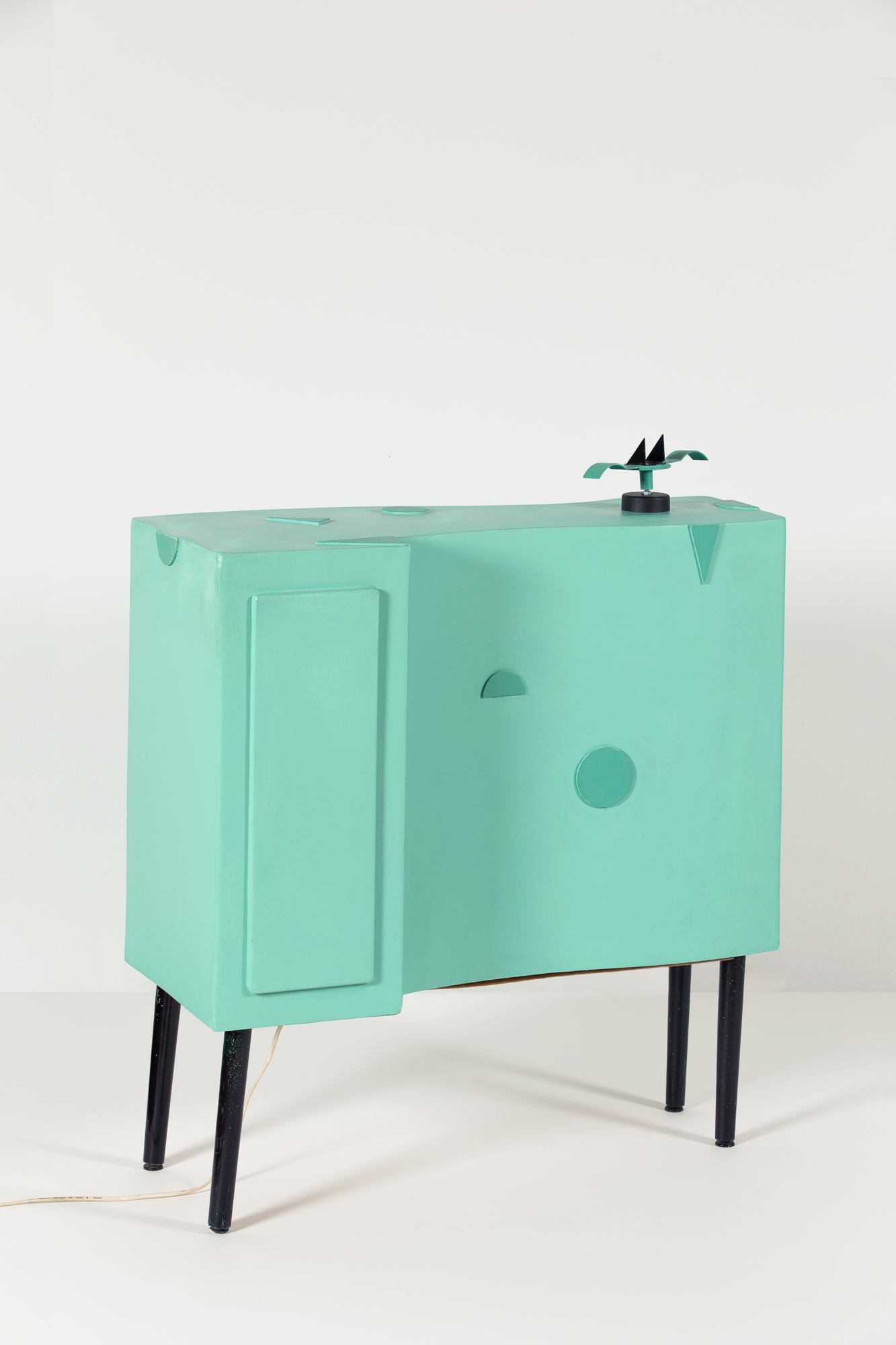
Green Wind (Mobile I). Kinetic object (1986). Ready-made, metal and electronics 81 × 82.5 × 35.7

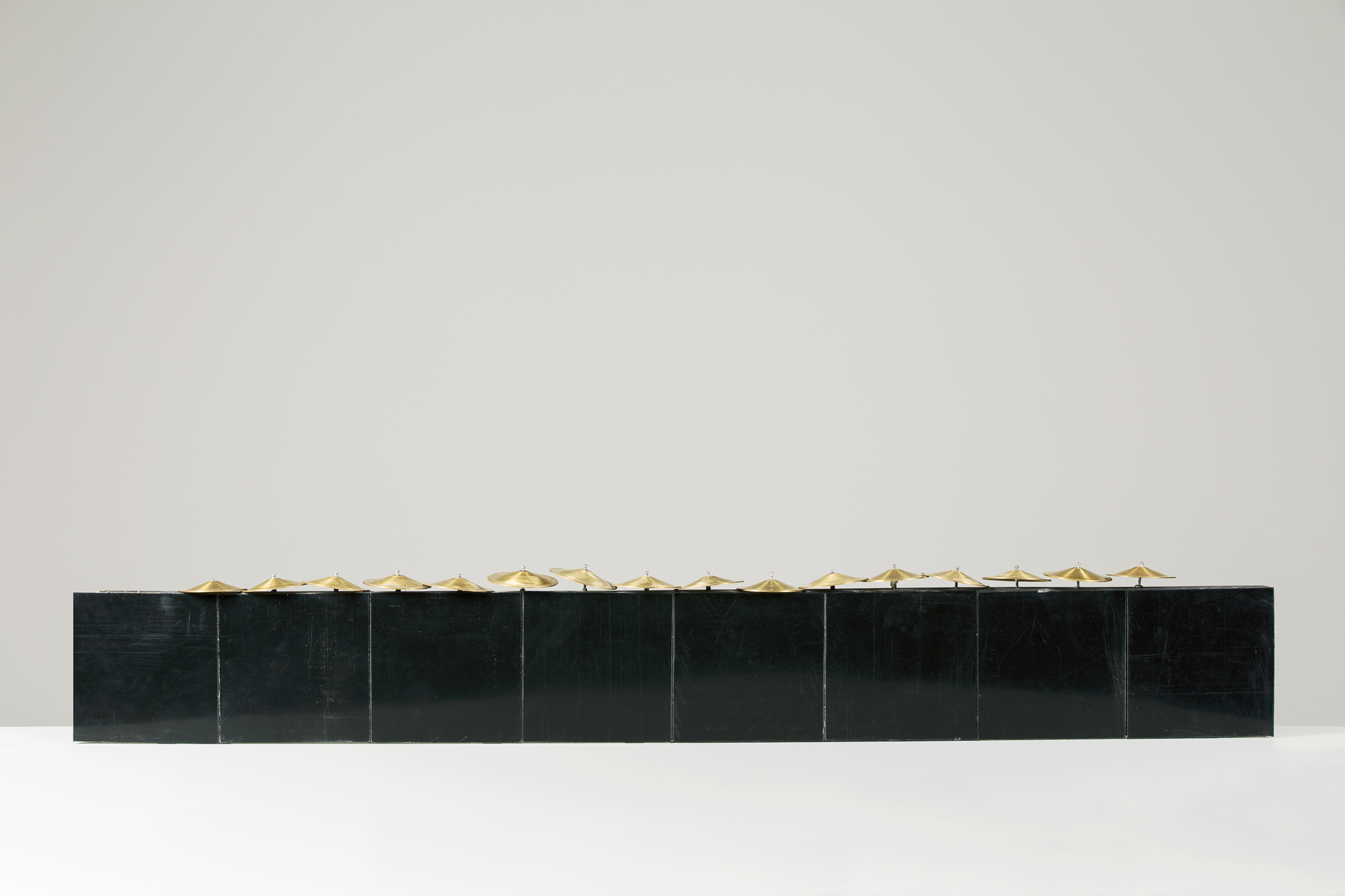
Whispering Waves. A kinetic sound object (2001). Plastic, a ready-made and electronics

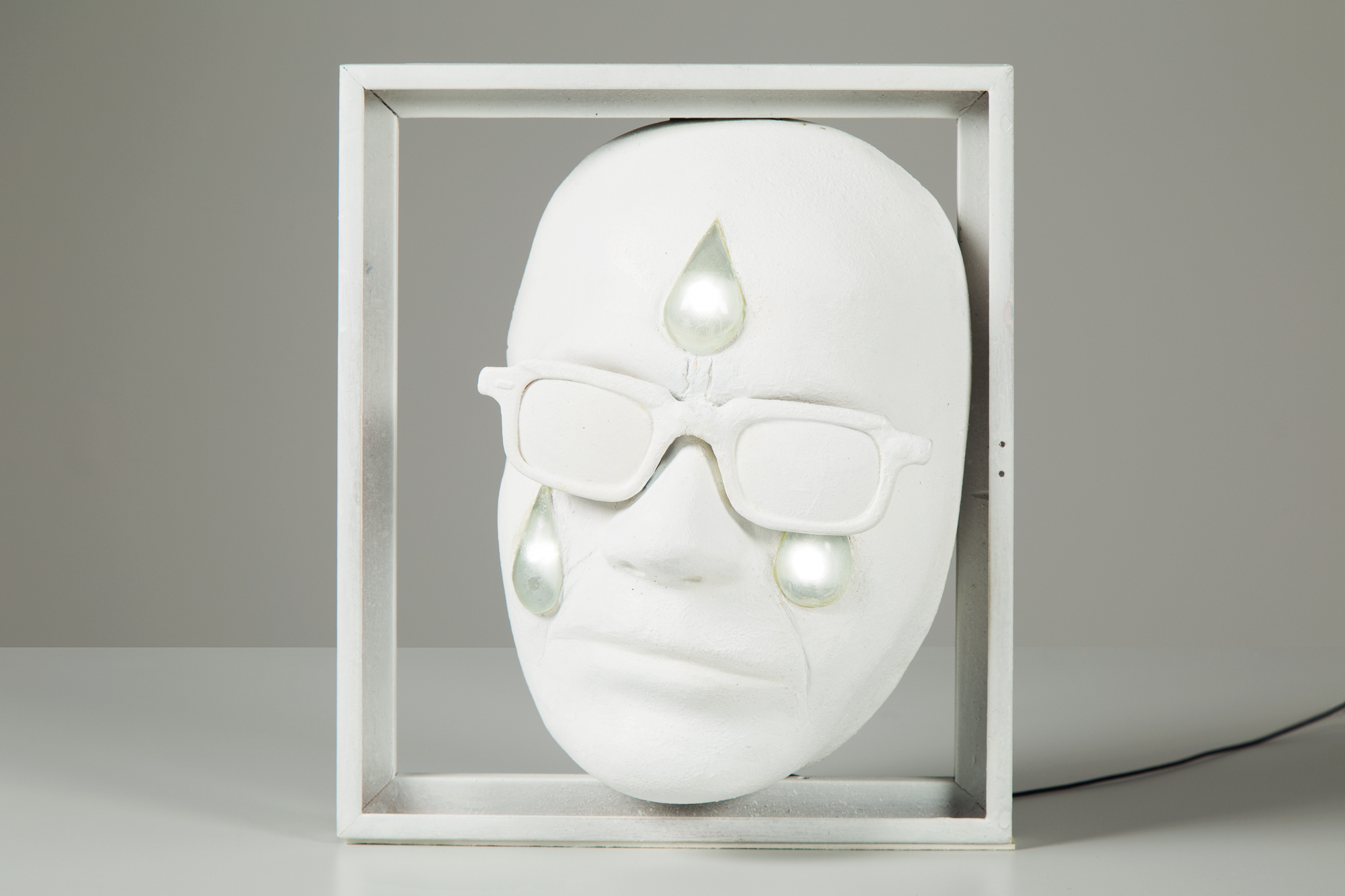
The Third Tear. A light object (2009). Ready-made, plastic and electronics 23.5 × 20.5 × 8

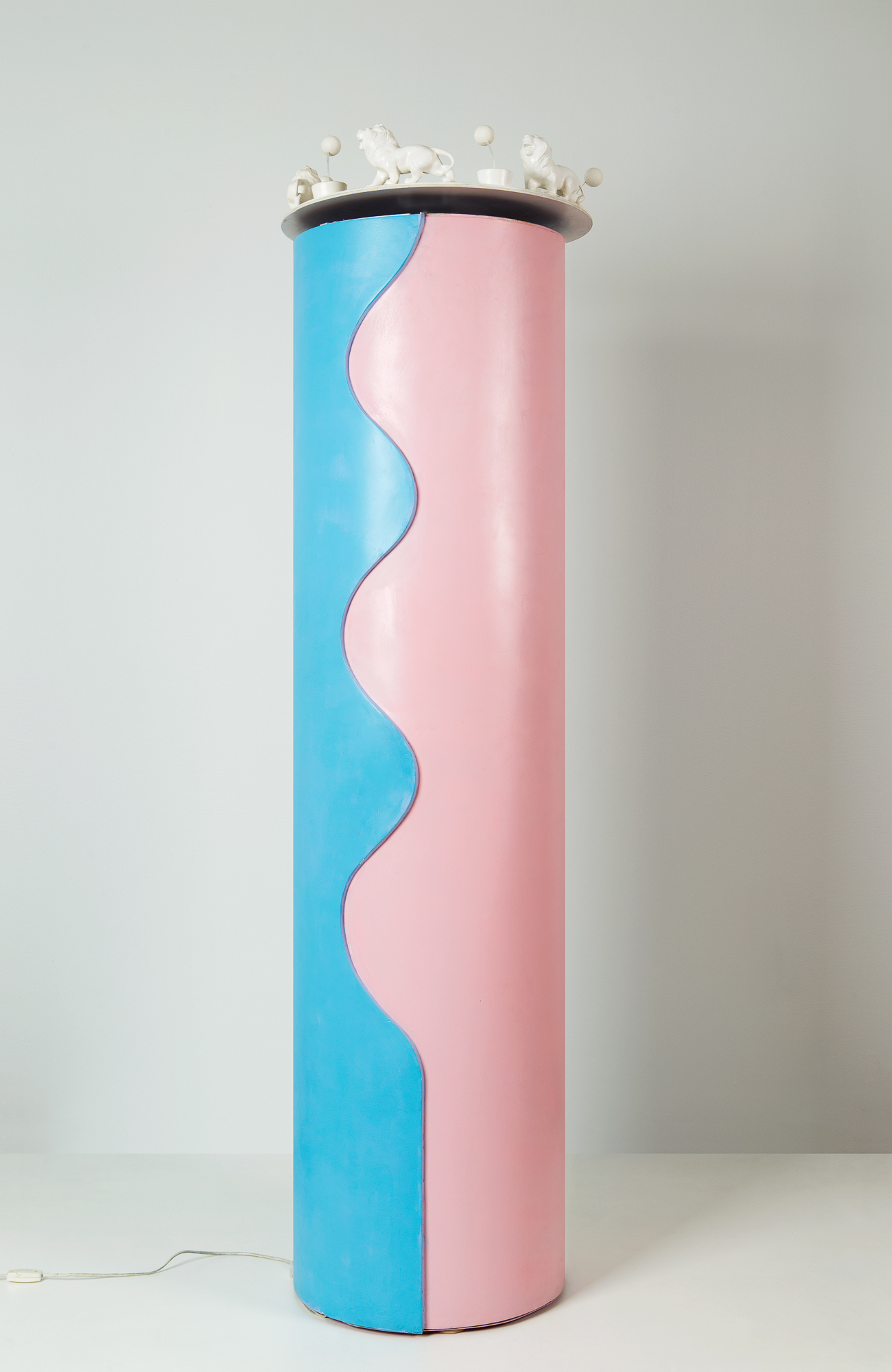
A Lion Column. A kinetic object (1973) Ready-made, wood, plastic and electronics 218 × 60 × diameter 52

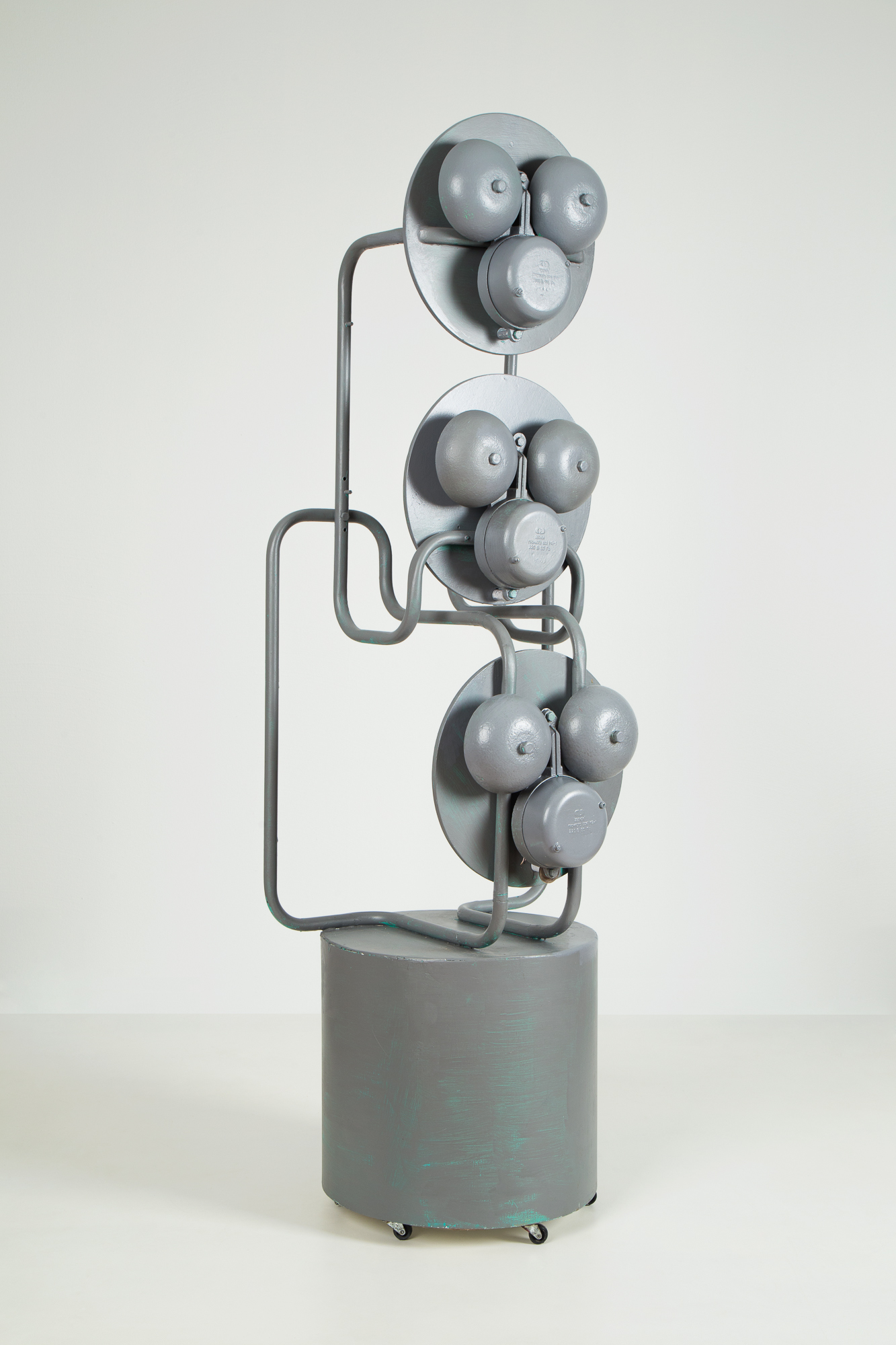
A Ringing Grey. A sound object (2008). Ready-made, electronics and wood 176 × 59 × 52

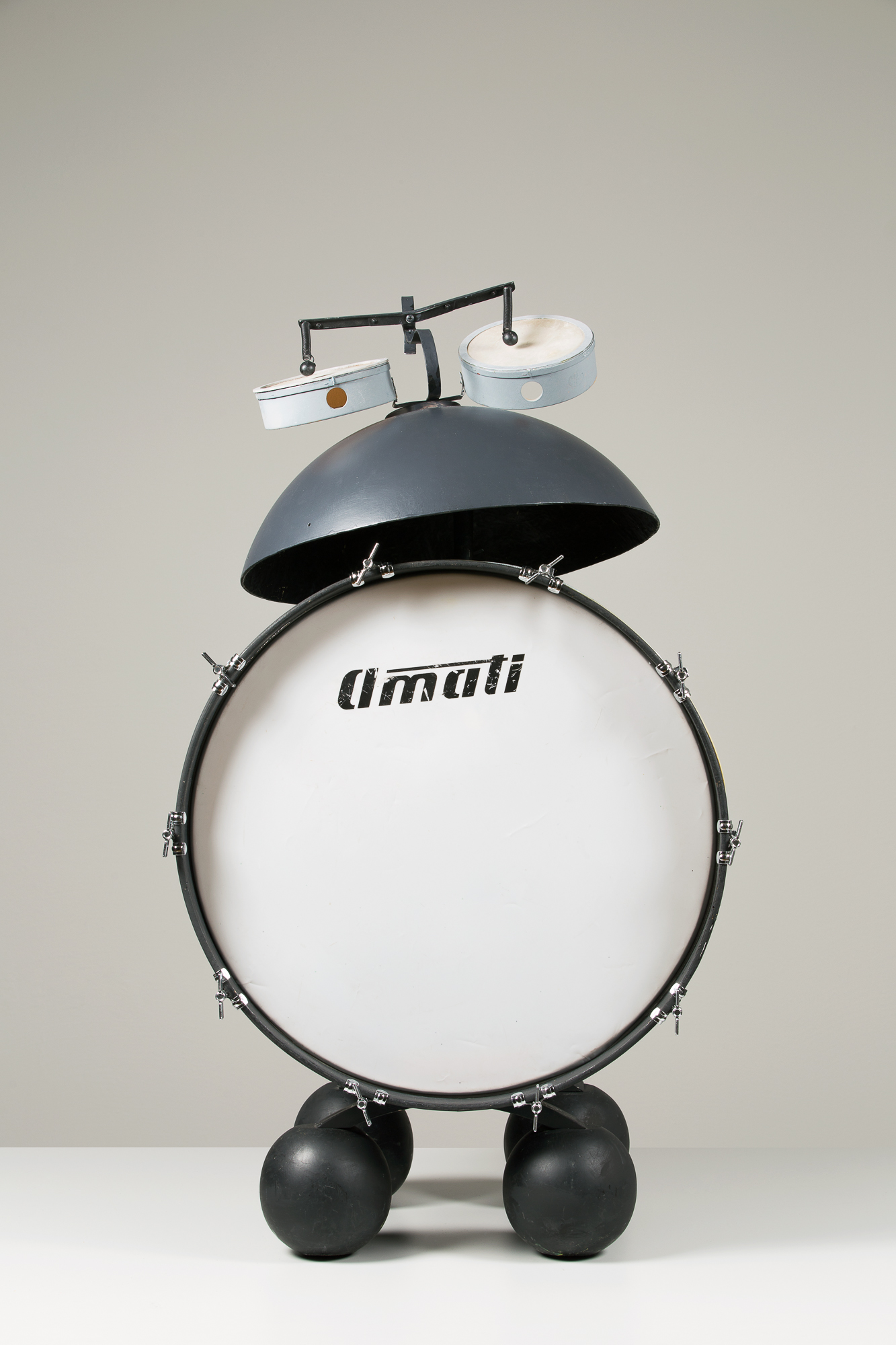
Alarm Clock “Amati”. A sound and light object (2007). Ready-made, plastic, wood and electronics 102 × 60.5 × 41

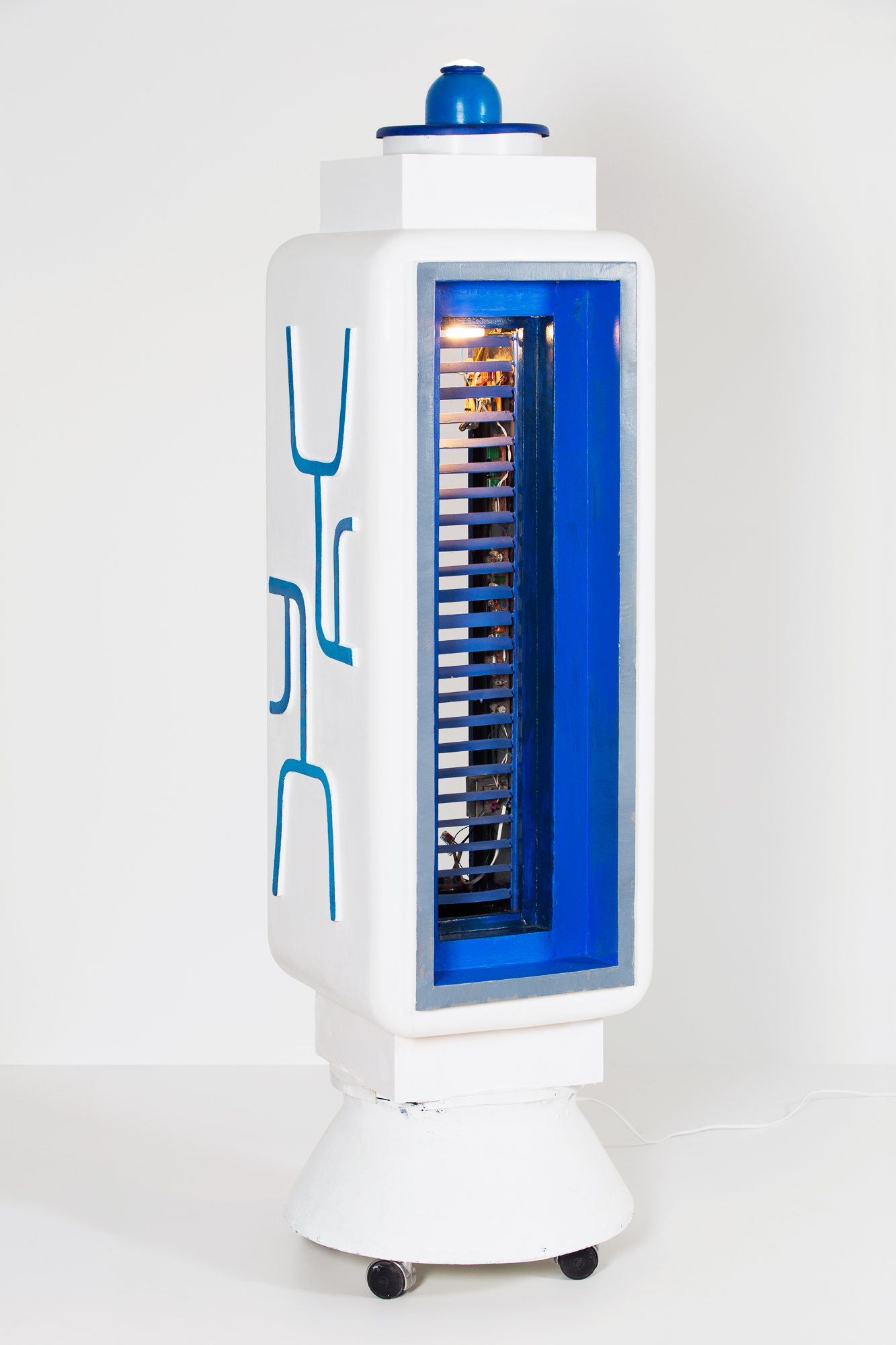
A Growler. A sound and light object (1993). Ready-made, plastic and electronics 173 × 50 × 50 Electronics: Härmo Härm

== A selection of personal exhibitions ==
- 1973 Painting exhibition, Tallinn Art Hall
- 1983 Estonian Museum of Applied Art and Design
- 1990 Gallery of the Tallinn Art Hall
- 1993 Gallery Sammas, Tallinn
- 1994 Around and opposite, Painting exhibition, Tokko & Arrak Gallery, Tallinn
- 1995 Speech Shadows, Tallinn City Gallery
- 1995 Exhibition, Deco Gallery, Tallinn
- 1996 Speech Shadows II, Bastejs Gallery, Riga
- 1997 Alma’s Railroad, Tallinn Art Hall
- 2001 Racing the Waves, Tallinn City Gallery
- 2003 Painting exhibition Dancing in the Sky, Järvenpää, Finland
- 2005 Exhibition with Härmo Härm in the cave gallery of the Retretti Art Centre, Savonlinna, Finland
- 2008 Polyphonic, SooSoo Gallery, Tallinn
- 2009 Double Exposition, Tartu Art House
- 2015 The Small Machine and Friends, Vabaduse Gallery, Tallinn
- 2018 Kaarel Kurismaa. Yellow Light Orchestra. Retrospective, Kumu Art Museum, Tallinn
- 2019 Kaarel Kurismaa. Old Man and the Musical Score, Temnikova & Kasela Gallery, Tallinn

== A selection of group exhibitions ==
- 1969 SOUP ’69, Pegasus Café, Tallinn
- 1974 Youth exhibition Man and Field, Tartu, Saku, and Pskov, Russia
- 1974 Exhibition, Pegasus Café
- 1975 Harku ‘75, Institute of Experimental Biology, Harku
- 1976 Estonian Art Institute, Tallinn, small hall
- 1984 Abstract Painting, with Lola Liivat and Ado Lill, Tartu Artists’ House
- 1989–1991 Structure/Metaphysics, Pori Art Museum, Kunsthalle Helsinki, Rovaniemi Art Museum, Kiel City Gallery, Nemo Gallery (Eckenförde), House of Culture (Stockholm), Liljevalch Art Hall (Stockholm), Linköping Museum
- 1995 Mobile 1, exhibition of Estonian kinetic art, Tallinn Art Hall
- 1995–2004 Blended I–VIII, Riga, Helsinki, Haapsalu, Kärdla, Valga, Sillamäe, Stockholm
- 1996 Dimensio, exhibition of Finnish art groups, Pieksämäki
- 1996 Tallinn-Moscow 1956–1985, Tallinn Art Hall
- 1996 Time, Space, Motion, Paide Action Art Festival
- 2004 Empty Spaces and Their Occupants, VI International Performance and Experimental Art Festival, Saint Petersburg
- 2005 Trichtlinnburg, Tallinn, Maastricht, Salzburg
- 2005 Ljubljana Biennial of Graphic Arts, with Kiwa
- 2008 A Perfect Circle, Gallery ArtDepoo, Tallinn
- 2011 Mystics and Moderns: Painting in Estonia Before Glasnost, Zimmerli Art Museum, New Jersey
- 2013 Joint exhibition by Estonian and Luxembourgish artists, Luxembourg
- 2013 Soviet Flower Children: Psychedelic Underground of the 1970s, Estonian National Museum
- 2013 Trespassing Modernities, architectural display, Salt Galata, Istanbul
- 2013 Out of Sync. Looking Back at the History of Sound Art, Kumu Art Museum, Tallinn
- 2016 Kumu Hits. Contemporary Art from the Collection of the Art Museum of Estonia, Kumu Art Museum, Tallinn
- 2018 The Other Trans-Atlantic. Kinetic and Op Art in Eastern Europe and Latin America 1950s–1970s, Garage Museum of Contemporary Art, Moscow
- 2018 Notes from the Underground – Art and Alternative Music in Eastern Europe 1968-1994, Akademie der Künste, Berlin
