= Ground level =

Ground level may refer to:

- Earth's surface
- Storey of a building/structure on (level with) the ground; also called the "ground floor"
- Ground Level, Australian band
- "Ground Level", a song by Stereo MCs from the album Connected

== See also ==
- Altitude above ground level, in aviation
- Ground (disambiguation)
- Ground-level ozone
- Ground-level power supply, in rapid transit
- Level (disambiguation)
