= Grounding =

Grounding or grounded may refer to:

== Science and philosophy ==
- Grounding (metaphysics), a topic of wide philosophical interest
- Grounding, a strategy for coping with stress or other negative emotions
- Grounding in communication, the collection of mutual knowledge, beliefs, and assumptions; "common ground"
- Ground (electricity), a common return path for electric current
- Symbol grounding problem, a problem in cognition and artificial intelligence

== Arts and media ==
- Grounded (comics), a comic book by Mark Sable for Image Comics
- Grounded (opera), 2023 opera by Jeanine Tesori (music) and George Brant (libretto)
- Grounded (video game), a multiplayer survival game by Obsidian Entertainment
- "Superman: Grounded" a storyline in the Superman comic book, written by J. Michael Straczynski
- Grounding (film), 2006 film about the collapse of the airline Swissair
- Unaccompanied Minors, a 2006 Christmas film that was titled Grounded in the UK and Ireland
- "Grounded", a song by Lower Than Atlantis from World Record
- "Grounded", a song by My Vitriol
- "Grounded", a song by Soul Asylum from the 1990 album And the Horse They Rode In On
- "Grounded", a song by Ross Jennings from the 2021 album A Shadow of My Future Self
- "Grounding", an interdisciplinary performance project by artist Gita Hashemi
- "Grounded" (Star Trek: Lower Decks), 2022 television episode

== Other uses ==
- Grounding (discipline technique), restrictions placed on movement, privileges, or both as punishment
- Grounding, or earthing, a pseudoscientific practice that involves people grounding themselves to the Earth for health benefits
- Grounding Inc, a video game development company
- Aircraft grounding, a restriction to prevent malfunctioning aircraft from flying
- Intentional grounding, a rule violation in gridiron football
- Ship grounding, a type of marine accident

== See also ==
- Ground (disambiguation)
- Ground truth
- Grind (disambiguation)
