= Grind (disambiguation) =

Grind is the cross-sectional shape of a blade.

Grind, grinds, or grinding may also refer to:

== Grinding action ==
- Grinding (abrasive cutting), a method of crafting
- Grinding (dance), suggestive club dancing
- Grinding (video gaming), repetitive and uninteresting gameplay
- Grinding (cricket), a style of batting that involves discipline, patience & mental strength.
- Bruxism, grinding of the teeth
- Grind (sport), a sliding stance usually performed in extreme sports such as aggressive skating and boardsports
  - Grind (skateboarding)
- Grind (whaling), pilot whale hunting in the Faroe Islands
- Grinds, private tutoring, in Ireland
- Mill (grinding), food processing
- Grinding, the operation of the winches on a yacht; the work done by a grinder (sailing position)

== Geography ==
- Grind, a village in Lăpugiu de Jos Commune, Hunedoara County, Romania
- Grind (Unirea), a tributary of the Unirea in Cluj and Alba Counties, Romania

== Film and TV ==
- Grind (2003 film), about amateur skaters
- The Grind (1915 film), a silent movie
- Grind (1997 film), starring Billy Crudup and Adrienne Shelly
- The Grind (TV series), MTV series

== Music ==
- Grindcore, a music genre
- Grind (musical), with a story by Fay Kanin
- Grind (soundtrack), the soundtrack to the 2003 film
- MTV Grind 1, a compilation album from the series

=== Songs ===
- "Grind" (song), a grunge song by Alice in Chains
- "Grind", by Gojira from the album Fortitude
- "G.R.I.N.D (Get Ready It's a New Day)", a song by Asher Roth
- "Grindin" (Lil Wayne song), 2014
- "Grindin'", a hip-hop song by Clipse
- "Grindin'" by NF and Marty from the album Therapy Session
- "Grindin'" by Axe Murder Boyz
- "Grindin'" (featuring Ricco Barrino) by 8Ball & MJG from the album Ten Toes Down
- "Grindin'" (featuring Z-Ro & C-Mo) by Big Moe from the album Unfinished Business
- "Grindin" (featuring Bone Crusher) by Goodie Mob from the album One Monkey Don't Stop No Show
- "Grindin" (with Shermanology) by Afrojack
- "Grindin'" (featuring Bad Azz) by Ras Kass from the album Rasassination

== Other ==
- In the Lisp community, the pretty-printer function is called 'grind'

== See also ==
- Grinder (disambiguation)
- Milling (disambiguation)
- G.R.I.N.D. Get Ready It's a New Day, 2017 Philippine TV series
