= DJ Jackie Christie =

- Also known as: Shine
- Born: Detroit, Michigan
- Origin: New York, New York
- Genres: house music
- Occupations: music producer, songwriter
- Instrument: turntable
- Years active: 1997–present
- Labels: Motéma Music; Nervous Records; Groovilicious
- Website: www.djjackiechristie.net

DJ Jackie Christie is an American DJ, songwriter, and music producer based in New York City. She is well known for her work at MTV's The Grind and The Limelight in New York City. She began releasing singles in 1997, originally under the alias, Shine, and her first album, Made 4 U, in 2004. The first single, "Beautiful Day," charted at #14 on the Billboard Club Chart. She also released a #1 remix of Madonna's "Nothing Falls" (Warner Bros.) as well as remixes of Yoko Ono's "Open Your Box" on Mind Train Records, and Kung Pow's "R U A DJ?" on Xtreme Records. She plans to sing on future albums.

Christie was mentioned in Bret Easton Ellis's Glamorama, and her music has appeared in Beauty Shop, and on TV's Street Time and Jenna Jameson’s One Hundred Hottest Hotties on VH1.

== Discography ==
- DJ Jackie Christie - Made 4 U (Motéma Dance, 2004)
- DJ Jackie Christie Feat. Discomind - Beautiful Day (Motéma Dance single, 2004)
- DJ Jackie Christie - Hot and Tasty Beats (Nervous Records, 2003)
- DJ Jackie Christie - A-U-T-Omatic White Label (2001)
- DJ Jackie Christie - Hard Tasty Beats (Nervous, 1999)
- Shine - Bitch Groovilicious/Strictly Rhythm (1998)
- Shine - Stimulating And Exciting (ft Connie Lingus & Phil Aseo) Groovilicious (1999)
- Dolce - Fire Tommy Boy Records
