= Mari Kurismaa =

Estonian interior architect and painter

- Born: April 19, 1956 (age 70); Pärnu, then part of Estonian SSR, Soviet Union
- Spouse: Kaarel Kurismaa

Mari Kurismaa (born 19 April 1956) is an Estonian interior architect and painter.

In 1979, she graduated from the Estonian State Art Institute in interior architecture.

During 1980s and 1990s she focused on painting. In the late 1990s she focused again on interior architecture.

Since 1987, she is a member of the Estonian Artists' Union. And the Estonian Association of Interior Architects since 1999.

Since 2002, she is working at OÜ Stuudio Kurismaa.

In 2013, she studied historic interiors and collections at the Attingham Trust Summer School.

== Exhibitions ==
Twilight Geometry.

Repeating Patterns, with Sirja-Liisa Eelma.

== Awards ==
- 1994: Kristjan Raud Art Award
- 1997, 2004 and 2015: annual prize of Estonian Cultural Endowment
- 2026: Konrad Mägi Art Prize

== Works ==
- 1987: Still Life with a Sphere (oil on canvas painting)
- 1997: renovation of the hall of Riigikogu (group work)
- 2002-2003: interior renovation for Estonian Drama Theatre (with the group Koldegrupp)
