= Călărași, Cluj =

Călărași Harasztos
- Commune
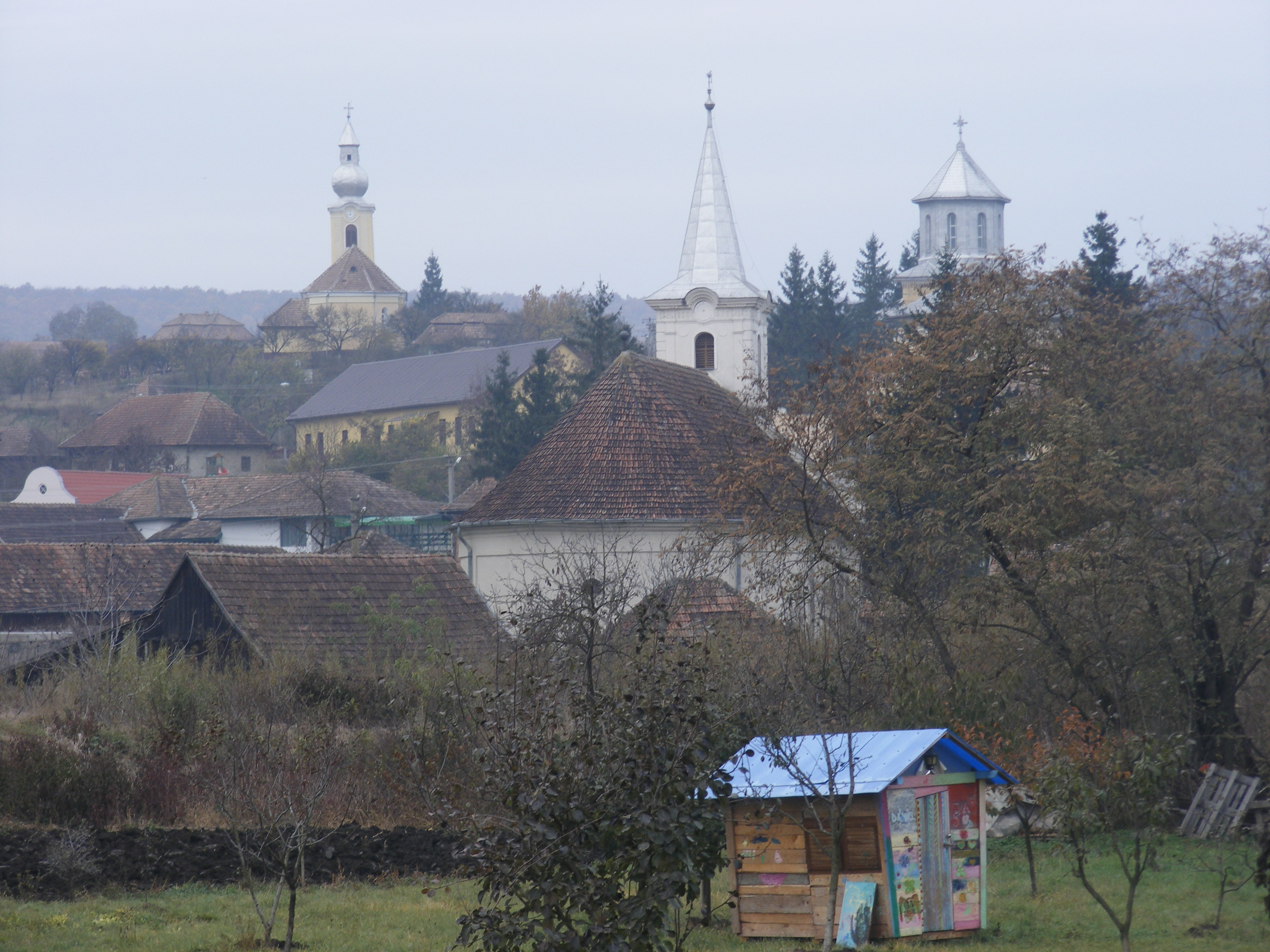
- Churches in Călărași village

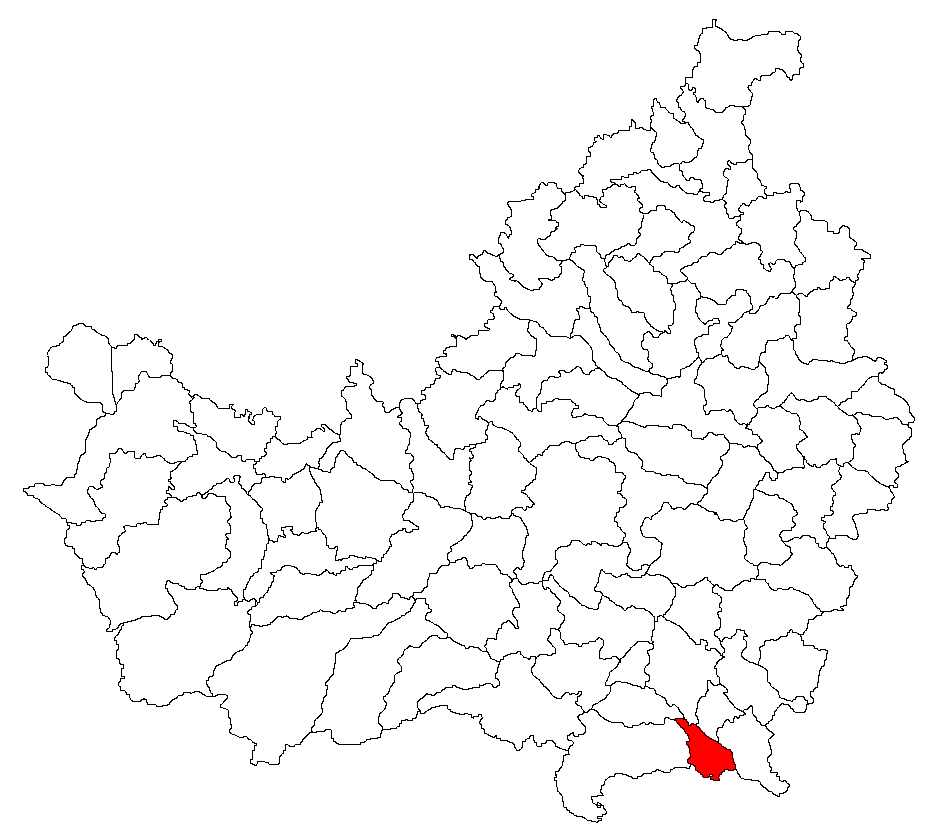
- Location in Cluj County

- Location in Romania
- Coordinates: 46°29′05″N 23°51′20″E
- Country: Romania
- County: Cluj
- Established: 1291
- Subdivisions: Bogata, Călărași, Călărași Gară

Government
  - Mayor (2020–2024): Ioan Vasile Racolța (PMP)
- Area: 37.9 km^{2} (14.6 sq mi)
- Elevation: 367 m (1,204 ft)
- Population (2021-12-01): 1,883
  - Density: 49.7/km^{2} (129/sq mi)
- Time zone: UTC+02:00 (EET)
  - Summer (DST): UTC+03:00 (EEST)
- Postal code: 407130
- Area code: +(40) x64
- Vehicle reg.: CJ
- Website: primariacalarasi-cluj.ro

Călărași (Romanian pronunciation: [kələˈraʃʲ]; Hungarian: Harasztos; German: Wahldorf) is a commune in Cluj County, Transylvania, Romania. It is composed of three villages: Bogata (Bogátpuszta), Călărași, and Călărași Gară (Harasztosi vasútitelep).

== Geography ==
The commune is situated at the western edge of the Transylvanian Plateau, at an altitude of 367 m (1,204 ft), on the banks of the river Grind. It is located in the southeastern corner of Cluj County, just south of the city of Turda, on the border with Alba County. The county seat, Cluj-Napoca, is 44 km (27 mi) to the northwest.

== Transportation ==
The A3 motorway and national road DN1 (part of European route E81) merge at the northern edge of Bogata village. The Călărași-Turda train station in Călărași Gară serves the CFR Main Line 300, which connects Bucharest with the Hungarian border near Oradea.

Just east of Călărași Gară (in Luna commune) is the 71st Air Base "General Emanoil Ionescu" of the Romanian Air Force.

== Demographics ==
Historical population
| Year | Pop. | ±% |
|---|---|---|
| 1850 | 1,389 | — |
| 1880 | 1,502 | +8.1% |
| 1890 | 1,825 | +21.5% |
| 1900 | 1,928 | +5.6% |
| 1910 | 1,936 | +0.4% |
| 1920 | 1,702 | −12.1% |
| 1930 | 1,874 | +10.1% |
| 1941 | 2,043 | +9.0% |
| 1956 | 2,105 | +3.0% |
| 1966 | 2,477 | +17.7% |
| 1977 | 3,036 | +22.6% |
| 2002 | 2,587 | −14.8% |
| 2011 | 2,021 | −21.9% |
| 2021 | 1,883 | −6.8% |
Source: Census data

According to the 2011 census, the commune had 2,021 inhabitants; Romanians made up 64.4% of the population, Hungarians made up 32.6%, and Roma made up 0.4%. At the 2021 census, Călărași had a population of 1,883; of those, 65.8% were Romanians and 23.53% Hungarians.
