= KIWA (music producer) =

Finnish electronic music producer

- Origin: Finland
- Genres: breaks, glitch hop, electro-funk, bass music, tech funk, electro house, psy trance, electronica, drum and bass
- Years active: 1995 -
- Labels: Solid Fiction, High Grade Recordings, Exogenic Records
- Members: Markku Louhio
- Past members: Matti Elsinen
- Website: www.kiwa.fi

KIWA a.k.a. Markku Louhio (Mark Nomen), is an electronic music producer and musician from Finland. Originally a duo, KIWA also included Matti Elsinen (DJ Mauzer) as a member until 2016. Since then Markku has continued the project as a solo artist.

Markku and Matti began their musical careers as producers in the psychedelic trance scene in 1995. The group started to make a name for themselves performing in underground raves and forest parties in the late 1990s. After their first releases on the Helsinki-based label Surreal Audio Recordings in 2000 and 2001, KIWA started to gain followers also internationally.

The music of KIWA has influences among other styles from funk, breaks, house and drum & bass. KIWA's first two albums, Dreamtime Enhancer (2002) and Retroactive (2004) , represent a style blending mix of psy trance, breaks, electronica and occasional references to drum & bass. Kiwa's third album On the Frequency (2007) shows a more progressive approach on dance music.

Since 2009 KIWA has produced music for various musical genres and labels outside the psy trance scene, including glitch hop, breaks and hip hop. .

Markku Louhio is also known for his other projects Headphonics, Highpersonic Whomen, Omen Sisters and The Faithealers.

== Discography ==
=== Albums ===
- Dreamtime Enhancer (Surreal Audio 2002)
- Retroactive (Surreal Audio 2004)
- On the Frequency (Exogenic Records 2007)
- Satisfiction - Part I (Adapted Records 2017)
- Satisfiction - Part II (Adapted Records 2017)

=== EPs and singles ===
- Kiwa EP 12" (Surreal Audio 2001)
- Phat Cat / "Disco Infection" 12" (Exogenic Records 2006)
- Deep Scan (Exogenic Records 2009)
- Drop Control (High Grade Recordings 2009)
- Dynamite / "Stream Funk" (High Grade Recordings 2009)
- Redemption (High Grade Recordings 2009)
- Turn the Flame / Killabyte (High Grade Recordings 2010)
- Evacuate The Soul (Solid Fiction 2013)
- Feed The Static (Elektroshok Records 2013)
- Boomstick (Adapted Records 2013)
- Ikaros EP (Solid Fiction 2020)
- Across The Globe (Solid Fiction 2020)

=== Remixes ===
track title - original artist

- It's All Good - Snake Thing (Surreal Audio 2002)
- Nasha Universo - Hidria Spacefolk (Exogenic Breaks 2004)
- He-Mandu - Skilda (L'oz production 2008)
- Blackout - Far Too Loud (Funkatech Records 2009)
- Serial Groover - Jaia (Tribal Vision Records 2009)
- Get Away From Me - Home Alone (Dead Famous Records 2010)
- Under Control - Quadrat Beat (High Grade Recordings 2010)
- Volta - Stylus Rex (Ground Level 2010)
- Pool Bandit - Squarefeet (Exogenic Records 2010)
- Are You OK - Yuhei Kubo (Bonerizing Records 2011)
- Under Pressure - Feuerhake (Logariddim Records 2011)
- Karavaani Kulkee - Paleface (Exogenic Records 2011)
- Imitation - Aggressivnes (Elektroshok Records 2011)
- 001 - Dieter (Unknown 2011)
- Bangarang - Deekline & Specimen A (Jungle Cakes 2022)

=== Compilations (appearing on) ===
track title - release (label + year)

- Planet of the Apes - Beats And Beyond CD (Surreal Audio 2000)
- Rahat Mulle - Custom File CD (Exogenic Records 2001)
- Fancy Medical Experience - Open CD (Surreal Audio 2001)
- Phat Muffin - Complications CD (Exogenic Breaks 2002)
- Arachnoid Dub - Elucidations CD (Liquid Sound Design 2002)
- Looper (Loopus In Fabula remix) - Loopus In Fabula CD (Demon Tea Recordings 2002)
- Alpha Sector - Psycholympics CD (Protune Records 2002)
- Dawn Dub - 13th Moon: Journey Into Future Consciousness CD (Interchill Records 2003)
- Wider Chanting - Angelic Science CD (Surreal Audio 2003)
- Alpha Sector - Trance Of Scandinavia 2xCD Trance Of Scandinavia (Digital Structures 2003)
- Offset - Ultrapop CD (Fabula Records 2004)
- Nasha Universo (remix) - Hidria Spacefolk - Nasha Universo (Exogenic Breaks 2004)
- Chronic - Funland Boogie Files CD (Space Boogie productions 2006)
- Get Wet - Ultrapop 2 CD (Fabula Records 2007)
- Inside - Ear Pleasure CD (Chill Tribe Records 2007)
- Hertz So Good - Psy Trance Euphoria 3 x CD (Ministry Of Sound 2008)
- Glaset Läcker - Redrama / Mark Nomen (Kiwa) (XO Records 2010)
