= Unirea (river) =

Unirea Létom-pataka
- Location within Romania

Location
- Country: Romania
- Counties: Cluj, Alba
- Villages: Unirea

Physical characteristics
- Mouth: Mureș
  - location: Unirea
  - coordinates: 46.3891°N 23.8051°E
- Length: 15 km (9.3 mi)
- Basin size: 134 km^{2} (52 sq mi)

Basin features
- Progression: Mureș→ Tisza→ Danube→ Black Sea
- Tributaries
  - left: Grind
  - right: Stejeriș, Măhăceni

The Unirea (Hungarian: Létom-pataka) is a right tributary of the river Mureș in Transylvania, Romania. It discharges into the Mureș in the village Unirea. Its length is 15 km (9.3 mi) and its basin size is 134 km^{2} (52 sq mi).
