= Ground of Being =

Ground of Being may refer to

- Georg Wilhelm Friedrich Hegel#Absolute spirit
- Ground (Dzogchen)
- Paul Tillich#God as the ground of being
- Brahman in Hinduism, the metaphysical ground of all being

== See also ==
- Theistic personalism
