= Housie Grounds =

Australian rules footballer (1903–1963)

Personal information
- Full name: Haslett Hawkesworth Grounds
- Born: 9 September 1903; South Melbourne, Victoria
- Died: 27 July 1963 (aged 59); Perth, Western Australia
- Original team: Melbourne Grammar / Scotch College
- Height: 179 cm (5 ft 10 in)
- Weight: 77 kg (170 lb)

Playing career^{1}
Years	Club	Games (Goals)
1924	St Kilda	4 (7)
- ^{1} Playing statistics correct to the end of 1924.

Haslett Hawkesworth "Housie" Grounds (9 September 1903 – 27 July 1963) was an Australian rules footballer who played with St Kilda in the Victorian Football League (VFL).
