= MTV Grind 1 =

MTV Grind Volume One

Compilation album by Various artists
- Released: October 21, 1997
- Genre: Dance
- Length: 55:12
- Label: Tommy Boy Records

Professional ratings
Review scores
Source	Rating
Allmusic	link

MTV Grind Volume 1, although called Volume 1, was the only album released for the MTV Grind series.

== Track listing ==
1. Virtual Insanity (Peace of Mind Mix) - Jamiroquai
2. It's No Good – Depeche Mode
3. Your Woman – Whitetown
4. Wannabe – Spice Girls
5. Runaway (Original Flava 12" Mix) – Nuyorican Soul
6. Free (Mood II Swing Mix) – Ultra Nate
7. Fired Up! (Club 69 Remix) – Funky Green Dogs
8. A Little Bit of Ecstasy (Cibola Remix) – Jocelyn Enriquez
9. Spin Spin Sugar (Armand's Dark Garage Mix) – Sneaker Pimps
10. Stupid Girl (Tee's Freeze Clubmix) – Garbage
11. One More Night (Hani Remix) – Amber
12. Ooh Aah... Just a Little Bit (Motiv 8 Edit) – Gina G
13. Samba de Janeiro (U.S Edit) - Felizia
14. Sugar is Sweeter (Armand's Drum & Bass Mix) - CJ Bolland
15. Nightmare (Club 69 Remix) - Brainbug
