= Lucy Grounds =

Australian politician (1908–1987)

Member of the Tasmanian Legislative Council
- In office 1951–1958
- Preceded by: Arthur Grounds
- Succeeded by: William Fry
- Constituency: Launceston

Personal details
- Born: 11 September 1908 Hobart, Tasmania, Australia
- Died: October 1987 (aged 79) Melbourne, Victoria, Australia
- Party: Tasmanian Labor Party
- Spouse: Arthur Grounds
- Occupation: Politician

Lucy Margaret Grounds (11 September 1908 – October 1987) was an Australian politician, who, from 1951 to 1958, was a member of the Tasmanian Legislative Council. She belonged to the Tasmanian Labor Party.

== Biography ==
Lucy Grounds was born in Glenorchy, a suburb of Hobart in Tasmania, Australia. In 1951, she was elected to the Tasmanian Legislative Council, as the Tasmanian Labor Party member for Launceston, following the death of her husband Arthur Grounds. She was the second woman to be elected to that position, and held the seat until she was defeated in 1958. Grounds died in Melbourne in October 1987. She was posthumously inducted into the Tasmanian Honour Roll of Women in 2005 for service to government and the community.
