= William Grounds =

New Zealand politician

The Honourable William Grounds MLC
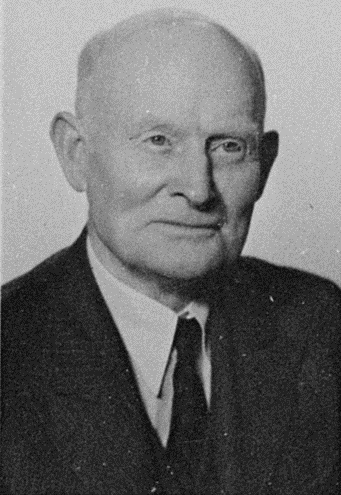

Member of the Legislative Council
- In office 15 July 1940 – 31 December 1950

Personal details
- Born: 11 November 1874 Birmingham, England
- Died: 1958 (aged 83–84) Broadwood, New Zealand
- Party: Labour Party

William Grounds (1874–1958) was a member of the New Zealand Legislative Council from 15 July 1940 to 14 July 1947; then 15 July 1947 to 31 December 1950, when the council was abolished. He was appointed by the First Labour Government.

He was from Birmingham, then Broadwood.
