= Arthur Grounds =

Australian politician (1898–1951)

Arthur Edwin Ernest Grounds (11 September 1898 – 29 July 1951) was an Australian politician.

He was born in Moonee Ponds, Victoria. In 1950 he was elected to the Tasmanian Legislative Council as the Labor member for Launceston. He died in 1951 and was succeeded by his widow Lucy, the second woman to serve in the Legislative Council.

Tasmanian Legislative Council
Preceded by Richard Green	Member for Launceston; 1950–1951	Succeeded by Lucy Grounds
