= Tallinn Art Hall =

Arts venue in Tallinn

Coordinates: 59.4343°N 24.7449°E

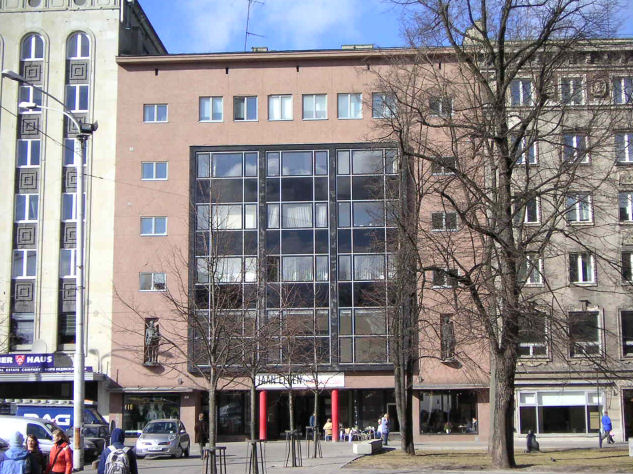
Tallinn Art Hall

Tallinn Art Hall (Estonian: Tallinna Kunstihoone) is an art gallery built in 1934 by Edgar Johan Kuusik on Freedom Square in Tallinn, Estonia.

It is known for its exhibitions of modern art, held in the gallery itself as well as the locations Tallinn Art Hall Gallery and Tallinn City Gallery.

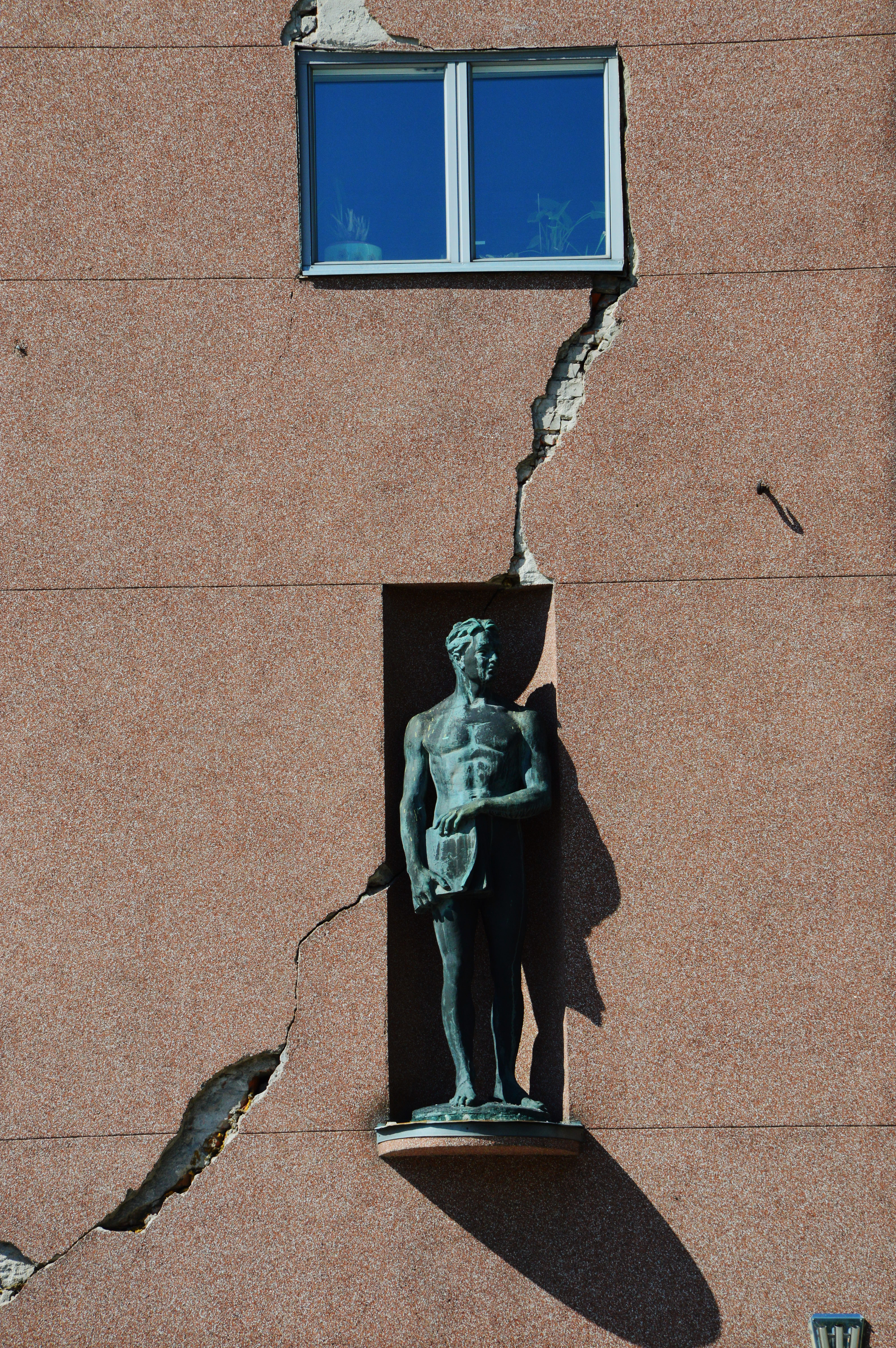
Work sculpture by Juhan Raudsepp

The original building was modified by adding an additional story in the 1960s. Perhaps this is what caused the crack in the facade visible near one of the two decorative sculptures of Work and Beauty by the sculptor Juhan Raudsepp.
