= Grind (Unirea) =

Grind Gerend-patak
- Location within Romania

Location
- Country: Romania
- Counties: Cluj County, Alba County
- Villages: Călărași, Lunca Mureșului, Războieni-Cetate

Physical characteristics
- Mouth: Unirea
  - coordinates: 46.3921°N 23.8082°E
- Length: 18 km (11 mi)
- Basin size: 52 km^{2} (20 sq mi)

Basin features
- Progression: Unirea→ Mureș→ Tisza→ Danube→ Black Sea

The Grind (Hungarian: Gerend-patak) is a left tributary of the river Unirea in Transylvania, Romania. It flows into the Unirea in the village Unirea. Its length is 18 km (11 mi) and its basin size is 52 km^{2} (20 sq mi).
