= The Grind (TV series) =

American music television series

- The cover of the spinoff Grind workout videos
- Country of origin: United States
- Original language: English
- No. of episodes: 1410

Production
- Executive producer: Lauren Levine
- Running time: 22 min.

Original release
- Network: MTV
- Release: June 29, 1992 – November 28, 1997

Related
- The Daily Burn

The Grind is a dance music show broadcast on the cable television station MTV between 1992 and 1997.

It replaced Club MTV, and featured people dancing to music tracks in a studio, linked by various hosts, including Eric Nies (fresh from The Real World: New York) and DJ Jackie Christie. While Club MTV was mostly dance, house and freestyle, The Grind featured hip hop with an occasional dance hit. The show spawned a number of aerobics and workout videotapes.

When MTV moved to its current location at 1515 Broadway, they lost the studio where Club MTV and The Grind were originally taped and episodes were taped on the roof of the building. The new space was small and inclement weather prevented taping. Noise ordinances prevented playing loud music while taping outdoors, so the show had to be taped without music and dubbed in later. Other installments went to Zuma Beach in California, Brooklyn, Miami and Hawaii.

Nies was replaced in 1995 by various guest hosts. Until the show was cancelled in the summer of 1998, it was re-branded with a sleeker look as The Daily Burn and was taped on the Jersey Shore. Michael Bergin and Tsianina Joelson co-hosted with DJ Skribble as t;he DJ.

- September 1992: The Grind debuted on MTV. Filmed at the MTV Studios in New York City.
- Summer 1993: The Grind relocated to the MTV Beach House on Long Island, NY. Two locations were used.
- September 1993: The Grind was filmed at Zuma Beach in Malibu, CA. Location was used thru the end of the year.
- January 1994: The Grind returned to the MTV Studios in New York City.
- Spring Break 1994: The Grind changed locations to San Diego, CA, for Spring Break '94.
- Summer 1994: The Grind returned to Zuma Beach in Malibu, CA.
- Late Summer 1994: The Grind was filmed in Brooklyn, NY, with a "Block Party" theme.
- September 1994: The Grind returned to the MTV Studios in New York City.
- Spring Break 1995: The Grind relocated to Lake Havasu, AZ, for Spring Break '95.
- Summer 1995: The Grind was filmed in Miami, FL, at the Raleigh Hotel in South Beach.
- Late Summer 1995: The Grind was filmed at the foot of the Brooklyn Bridge in Brooklyn, NY, with a Carnival theme complete with carnival rides, clowns, and jugglers. It was at this point in the show's run that Eric Nies would gradually be replaced as host.
- September 1995: The Grind returned to the MTV Studios in New York City.
- January 1996: The Grind relocated to Hawaii. This would be Eric Nies' last appearance as host.
- Spring Break 1996: The Grind was filmed in Panama City, FL, for Spring Break '96. This did not feature any of The Grind's regular dancers. Instead, local spring breakers were used. It was at this juncture where The Grind stopped playing its usual mainstream music; changing it to techno, underground dance, house club music. This genre of music would be played for the remainder of The Grind's run on MTV.
- Late Spring/Early Summer 1996: The Grind was filmed in the pool area of the Hard Rock Hotel and Casino Resort in Las Vegas, NV.
- Summer 1996: The Grind relocated to the MTV Beach House in southern California. This would be the last time The Grind would be filmed. In September 1996, only reruns of the show appeared on MTV.
- Summer 1997: After a long hiatus, an attempt was made to resurrect The Grind using the movie "Austin Powers: International Man of Mystery" to help relaunch the show. The theme of the set was a late 1960s Go-Go Bar dance hall. Mike Myers made an appearance as his character, Austin Powers. The show played techno, underground, house, and club music. None of the original Grind dancers were featured.

== See also ==
- MTV Grind 1
