= Ground Level =

Australian band

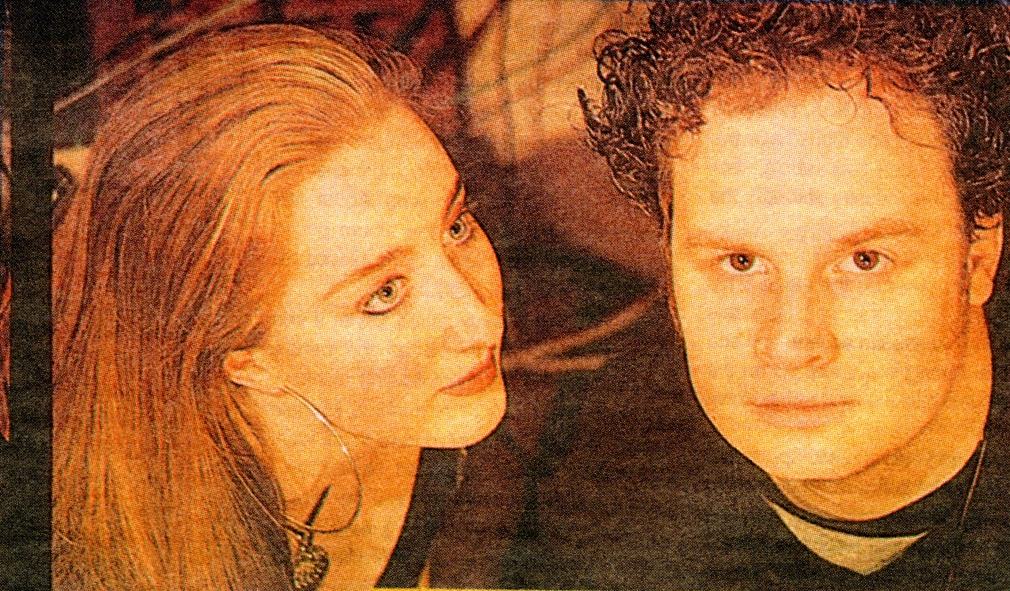
- Ground Level in Melbourne, 1996

Background information
- Origin: Melbourne, Victoria, Australia
- Genre: Electronic
- Years active: 1990–1996
- Labels: Vicious Vinyl, Pulse 8, Intercord Tontrager GmbH, Sonic, Instinct
- Past members: Jean-Marie Guilfoil; David Walker

Ground Level were an Australian electronic music performance and production duo consisting of David John Walker (born in Melbourne, Victoria, Australia) and Jean-Marie Guilfoil (born in Madison, Wisconsin, United States). Their single, "Dreams of Heaven" was an underground dance club release which peaked at No. 54 on the mainstream UK Singles Chart in January 1993. They released an album, New Moon in 1995.

== History ==
Ground Level formed in Melbourne as the electronic duo of David John Walker and Jean-Marie Guilfoil. In 1990, they issued their first single, "Deputy of Love", as a 12" three-track under the name, Ground Level featuring D J Walker, on an independent label. By 1992, they had signed with Vicious Vinyl and released "God Intended" in January, which was written and produced by Walker. "Out of Body" appeared in June, followed by Ground Level's fourth single, "Dreams of Heaven", which peaked at No. 54 on the UK Singles Chart in January 1993. According to Vicious Vinyl label owner, Andy Van (a.k.a. Andy Van Dorsselaer see Madison Avenue), the single was one of their biggest successes "[it] was a very, very big hit. It got to No. 3 on the dance charts in the UK."

The group released six singles and an album, New Moon (1995), through Vicious Vinyl in Australia. Their singles were released in the UK and Europe through Faze 2 on the Pulse 8 record label, Intercord Tontrager GmbH (merged with the EMI Electrola roster in 2000) and Sonic Records, part of Instinct Records. Ground Level's singles also appeared on compilation albums in Europe, Japan, and the United States, where "God Intended" was featured on Sonic Records' Killer Techno US compilation. Their sixth single, "Searching for the Truth" was performed with co-writer John Kenny (ex-Rockmelons).

== Discography ==
=== Albums ===
List of albums with selected details
Title	Details
New Moon	Released: 1995; Format: CD; Label: Vicious Vinyl (VVLP003CD)

=== Charted singles ===
List of charted singles, with selected chart positions
Title	Year	Chart positions
Title	Year	UK
"Dreams of Heaven"	1993	54
