= Foreign relations of Sri Lanka =

Foreign relations of Sri Lanka refers to the diplomatic and commercial relations between Sri Lanka and other countries. Sri Lanka has stressed its principle of "friendship towards all, enmity towards none" in its diplomacy.

Since the 1950s, Sri Lanka has followed a non-aligned foreign policy, which does not take sides with major powers. Since the end of the Cold War in Asia, the country has pursued better relations with all major powers and seeks to strengthen its diplomatic, economic and military ties with China, India, Pakistan, Russia, the United States, Japan, South Korea and the European Union. Sri Lanka has also forged close ties with the member states of the Association of Southeast Asian Nations (ASEAN), African Union and Arab League.

Sri Lanka participates in multilateral diplomacy, particularly at the United Nations, where it seeks to promote sovereignty, independence, and development in the developing world. Sri Lanka was a founding member of the Non-Aligned Movement (NAM). It also is a member of the Commonwealth of Nations, South Asian Association for Regional Cooperation (SAARC), World Bank, International Monetary Fund (IMF), Asian Development Bank (ADB), Shanghai Cooperation Organisation (as dialogue partner) and the Colombo Plan. Sri Lanka continues its active participation in the NAM, while also stressing the importance it places on regionalism by playing a strong role in SAARC.

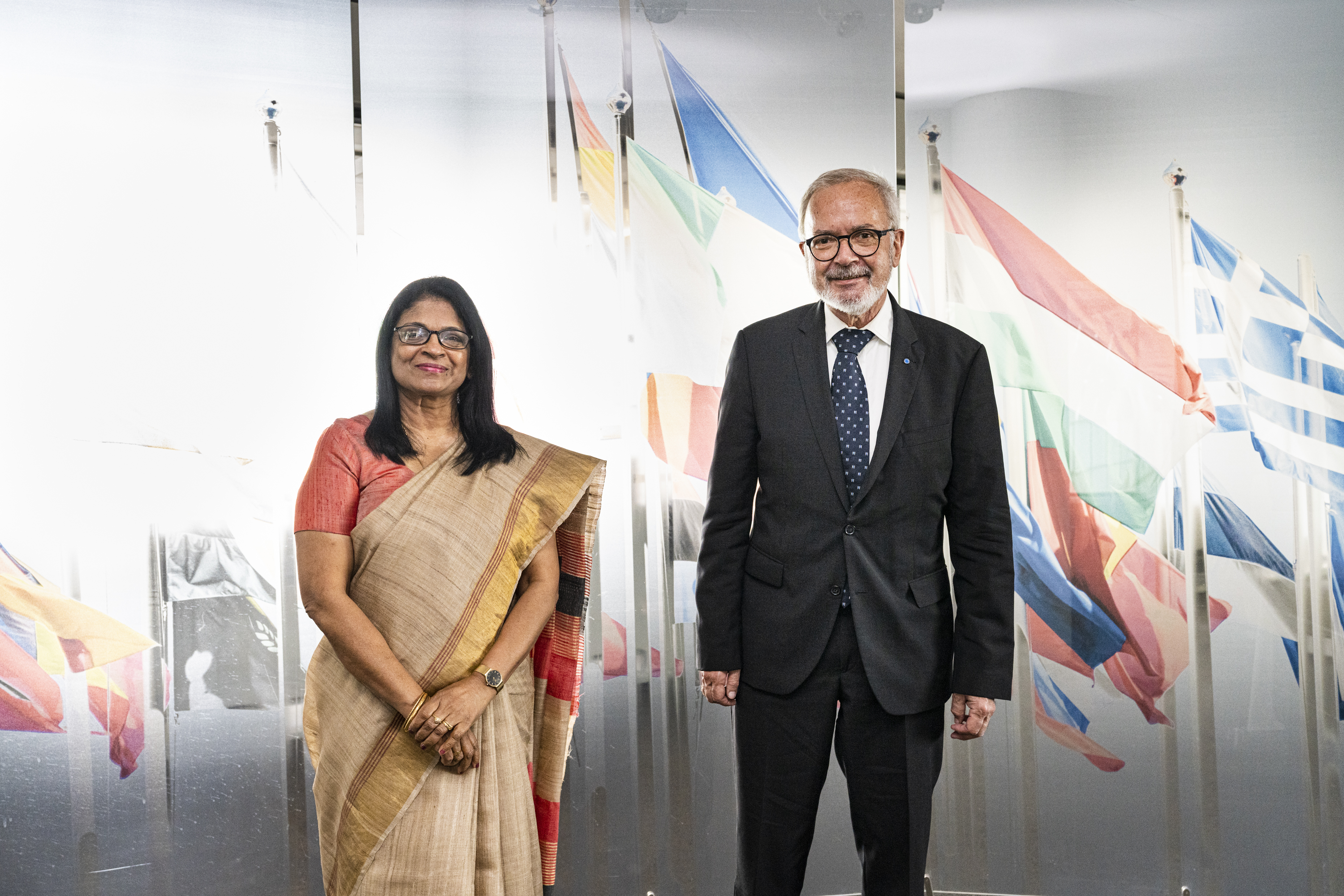
Sri Lanka Ambassador to the European Union Grace Asirwatham.

== History ==
The goal of Sri Lanka's foreign policy is to maintain a strong, independent, powerful and unitary Sri Lanka, whose foreign policy establishment maintains it in achieving that goal.

Sri Lanka's foreign policy is based on the national interest. In a period of change, foreign policy responds to new challenges and opportunities. It is an integral part of building national capabilities through economic development, strengthening the social fabric and public well-being, and protecting Sri Lanka's sovereignty and territorial integrity. Sri Lanka's foreign policy involves international engagement based on an assessment of the bilateral, regional, and global geopolitical and economic environment.

== Military ==
The Sri Lanka Armed Forces are the overall unified military of Sri Lanka and encompass the Sri Lanka Army, Navy, and Air Force, which come under the Ministry of Defence (MOD). They receive military support mainly from China, Russia, India, Pakistan and Israel. The United States also gives limited support.

== Diplomatic relations ==
Following is a list of countries Sri Lanka maintains diplomatic relations with:

#	Country	Date
1	United Kingdom	22 October 1946
2	Australia	29 April 1947
3	Turkey	4 February 1948
4	Pakistan	3 May 1948
5	India	11 October 1948
6	France	27 October 1948
7	United States	29 October 1948
8	Myanmar	7 June 1949
9	Sweden	18 November 1949
10	Italy	18 April 1950
11	Norway	13 October 1950
12	Netherlands	23 November 1951
13	Japan	28 April 1952
14	Cambodia	28 May 1952
15	Indonesia	6 August 1952
16	Denmark	5 January 1953
17	Portugal	January 1953
18	Belgium	27 July 1953
19	Canada	20 August 1953
20	Germany	3 December 1953
21	Austria	23 April 1954
22	Finland	24 September 1954
23	Spain	12 April 1955
24	Thailand	20 November 1955
25	New Zealand	14 December 1955
26	Switzerland	5 October 1956
27	China	7 February 1957
28	Russia	19 February 1957
29	Poland	18 April 1957
30	Nepal	1 July 1957
31	Czech Republic	11 September 1957
32	Romania	15 September 1957
33	Serbia	14 October 1957
34	Egypt	24 October 1957
35	Malaysia	October 1957
36	Israel	1 January 1958
37	Greece	19 March 1958
38	Afghanistan	1 November 1958
39	Hungary	15 February 1959
40	Cuba	29 July 1959
41	Brazil	22 January 1960
42	Mexico	19 April 1960
43	Senegal	1960
44	Philippines	11 January 1961
45	Ghana	24 January 1961
46	Iraq	22 February 1961
47	Argentina	5 January 1962
48	Mongolia	1 February 1962
49	Bulgaria	10 June 1962
50	Chile	1962
51	Iran	1962
52	Bolivia	1963
53	Jordan	6 July 1965
54	Laos	20 July 1965
55	Maldives	26 July 1965
56	Sudan	17 October 1968
57	Syria	10 May 1969
58	Nigeria	January 1970
59	North Korea	15 July 1970
60	Singapore	20 July 1970
61	Vietnam	21 July 1970
62	Kenya	4 September 1970
63	Trinidad and Tobago	November 1971
64	Kuwait	19 February 1971
65	Bangladesh	4 March 1972
66	Luxembourg	27 July 1972
67	Fiji	September 1972
68	Uganda	30 November 1972
69	Algeria	1972
70	Ethiopia	1972
71	Libya	1972
72	Zambia	16 April 1973
73	Tanzania	July 1973
74	Guyana	14 July 1974
75	Saudi Arabia	30 November 1974
76	Peru	17 March 1975
—	Holy See	15 February 1976
77	Panama	8 March 1976
78	Mauritius	19 July 1976
79	Qatar	20 July 1976
80	Costa Rica	11 June 1977
81	South Korea	14 November 1977
82	Democratic Republic of the Congo	13 May 1978
83	United Arab Emirates	19 July 1979
84	Yemen	September 1979
85	Albania	4 March 1980
86	Cyprus	4 March 1980
87	Oman	17 February 1981
88	Tunisia	7 December 1981
89	Somalia	4 January 1982
90	Bhutan	13 May 1982
91	Papua New Guinea	17 November 1982
92	Zimbabwe	1983
93	Vanuatu	28 September 1983
94	Tonga	10 January 1984
95	Brunei	3 April 1984
96	Venezuela	9 April 1987
97	Colombia	30 September 1988
—	State of Palestine	6 February 1989
98	Morocco	27 November 1990
99	Guinea	6 August 1991
100	Armenia	12 February 1992
101	Ukraine	12 February 1992
102	Bahrain	27 June 1992
103	Kazakhstan	29 June 1992
104	Azerbaijan	4 August 1992
105	Moldova	27 November 1992
106	Slovakia	15 February 1993
107	Tajikistan	20 April 1994
108	South Africa	12 September 1994
109	Estonia	31 January 1996
110	Kyrgyzstan	29 January 1996
111	Ireland	February 1996
112	Turkmenistan	18 April 1996
113	Slovenia	25 July 1996
114	Lithuania	20 August 1996
115	Latvia	19 September 1996
116	Croatia	10 February 1997
117	Lebanon	7 May 1997
118	North Macedonia	10 April 1998
119	Georgia	16 June 1998
120	Seychelles	3 October 1998
121	Jamaica	29 September 1998
122	Iceland	23 December 1998
123	Mozambique	12 March 1999
124	Namibia	8 April 1999
125	Uruguay	21 July 1999
126	Uzbekistan	11 October 1999
127	Malta	27 January 2000
128	Eswatini	27 June 2000
129	Lesotho	14 July 2000
130	Belarus	20 November 2000
131	Bosnia and Herzegovina	22 June 2001
132	Madagascar	27 July 2001
133	Angola	3 February 2004
134	Bahamas	19 July 2005
135	Eritrea	15 November 2007
136	Botswana	27 October 2008
137	Paraguay	3 April 2009
138	Liberia	17 July 2009
139	Dominican Republic	3 February 2011
140	Montenegro	4 April 2011
141	Rwanda	20 April 2011
142	Ecuador	9 May 2011
143	Malawi	9 June 2011
144	Mali	19 January 2012
145	Republic of the Congo	1 February 2012
146	San Marino	7 June 2012
147	Burkina Faso	15 November 2012
148	Suriname	16 November 2012
149	El Salvador	10 December 2012
150	Haiti	14 December 2012
151	Grenada	19 December 2012
152	Mauritania	21 December 2012
153	Saint Vincent and the Grenadines	15 January 2013
154	Guatemala	26 February 2013
155	Honduras	12 March 2013
156	Solomon Islands	3 July 2013
157	Benin	12 August 2013
158	South Sudan	25 September 2013
159	Sierra Leone	16 November 2013
160	Ivory Coast	5 March 2014
161	Samoa	15 August 2014
162	Togo	27 September 2015
163	Djibouti	16 November 2015
164	Monaco	26 July 2016
165	Andorra	30 November 2016
166	Dominica	17 April 2018
167	Burundi	11 March 2019
168	Gambia	10 May 2019
169	Nicaragua	10 May 2019
170	Saint Lucia	25 June 2019
171	Barbados	28 June 2019
172	Liechtenstein	5 March 2021
173	Gabon	19 March 2021
174	Saint Kitts and Nevis	22 March 2021
175	Timor-Leste	4 May 2022
176	Guinea-Bissau	6 December 2023
177	Antigua and Barbuda	3 October 2025
178	Belize	21 October 2025

== Bilateral relations ==
=== Africa ===
Country	Formal Relations Began	Notes
Kenya	1970	See Kenya–Sri Lanka relations
South Africa	16 September 1994	See South Africa–Sri Lanka relations

=== Americas ===
Country	Formal Relations Began	Notes
Cuba	29 July 1959	See Cuba–Sri Lanka relations
Mexico	19 April 1960	See Mexico–Sri Lanka relations: Mexico is accredited to Sri Lanka from its embassy in New Delhi, India, and maintains an honorary consulate in Colombo.; Sri Lanka is accredited to Mexico from its embassy in Washington, DC, United States, and maintains an honorary consulate in Mexico City.
United States	23 October 1948	See Sri Lanka–United States relations President Jayewardene of Sri Lanka presents a baby elephant to President Reagan and the American people in 1984: The US Embassy in Sri Lanka is located in Colombo, as are the US Agency for International Development offices and Public Affairs offices. IBB offices are located near Chilaw, 75 km north of Colombo.; Sri Lankan Embassy is located in Washington, DC.

=== Asia ===
Country	Formal Relations Began	Notes
Armenia	12 February 1992	See Foreign relations of Armenia: Armenia is accredited to Sri Lanka from its embassy in New Delhi, India.; Sri Lanka is accredited to Armenia from its embassy in Moscow, Russia.
Bangladesh	1972	See Bangladesh – Sri Lanka relations
Bhutan	13 May 1987	Diplomatic relations began in 1987.; The ambassador of the Sri Lankan High Commission in New Delhi is accredited to Bhutan.; The ambassador of the Bhutanese Embassy in Dhaka is accredited to Sri Lanka.; Bhutan has an honorary consulate in Colombo.
China	7 February 1957	See China–Sri Lanka relations: China has an embassy in Colombo.; Sri Lanka has an embassy in Beijing and a consulates-general in Guangzhou and Shanghai.
India	4 February 1948	See India–Sri Lanka relations Bilateral relations between Sri Lanka and India have been generally friendly but were affected by the Sri Lankan civil war and by the failure of the Indian Peace Keeping Force during the civil war. India is Sri Lanka's only neighbour, separated by the Palk Strait. Both nations occupy a strategic position in South Asia and have sought to build a common security umbrella in the Indian Ocean. Relations between India and Sri Lanka relations have undergone a qualitative and quantitative transformation in the recent past. Political relations are close, trade and investments have increased dramatically, infrastructural linkages are constantly being augmented, defence collaboration has increased and there is a general, broad-based improvement across all sectors of bilateral cooperation. India was the first country to respond to Sri Lanka's request for assistance after the tsunami in December 2004. In July 2006, India evacuated 430 Sri Lankan nationals from Lebanon, first to Cyprus by Indian Navy ships and then to Delhi & Colombo by special Air India flights. There exists a broad consensus within the Sri Lankan polity on the primacy of India in Sri Lanka's external relations matrix. Both major political parties in Sri Lanka, the Sri Lanka Freedom Party and the United Nationalist Party, have contributed to the rapid development of bilateral relations in the last ten years. Sri Lanka has supported India's candidature to the permanent membership of the UN Security Council.
Indonesia	6 August 1952	See Indonesia–Sri Lanka relations: Indonesia has an embassy in Colombo.; Sri Lanka has an embassy in Jakarta.
Iran	1961	See Iran–Sri Lanka relations Iran and Sri Lanka have had official diplomatic relations since 1961. Diplomatic relations between Iran and Sri Lanka (then known as Ceylon) began in 1961 via the Ceylonese embassy in Islamabad, which was the closest Ceylon had to a presence on Iranian soil until the opening of the Tehran embassy office in 1990. Tehran set up its Colombo office in 1975. After Mahmoud Ahmadinejad became President of Iran, Sri Lanka was the first country he visited on his inaugural Asian tour. Mahinda Rajapaksa also made ties with Iran a priority after he ascended to office.
Iraq	22 February 1961	See Sri Lanka–Iraq relations: Sri Lanka has an embassy in Baghdad; Iraq has an embassy in Colombo.; Iraq was the largest buyer of Sri Lankan tea during the reign of Saddam Hussein. Ties between Sri Lanka and Iraq were disrupted during the Iraq War. However, in 2018 Iraq re-emerged as the largest buyer of Sri Lankan Tea.
Israel	1 June 1956	See Israel–Sri Lanka relations Sri Lanka has a close relationship with Israel, and its military is a major user of Israeli weapons systems that include the IAI Kfir Fighter Jet, the Super Dvora Mk III class Patrol Vessel, and the Gabriel missile. In May 2011, the Israeli Minister of Agriculture visited Sri Lanka with an agro-business delegation to promote cooperation between the two countries.
Japan	28 April 1952	See Japan – Sri Lanka relations During the Second World War, an air raid was carried out by Japan to bomb the city of Colombo in Sri Lanka. Later, relations between Japan and Sri Lanka became friendly, and they established official relations in 1952. Japan has an embassy in Colombo. Sri Lanka has an embassy in Tokyo. Sri Lankan President JR Jayawardene played a major role in re-admitting Japan to the world community at the San Francisco Conference
Malaysia	October 1957	See Malaysia–Sri Lanka relations Malaysia has a high commission in Colombo, and Sri Lanka has a high commission in Kuala Lumpur.
Maldives	26 July 1965	See Maldives–Sri Lanka relations
Nepal	1 July 1957	Foreign relations of Nepal Nepal and Sri Lanka established diplomatic relations on 1 July 1957. Nepal opened an honorary consulate general in Colombo in 1975 and established its embassy in 1995. Sri Lanka has a residential embassy in Kathmandu since 1993. Around sixty thousand Sri Lankans visit Lumbini annually to pay homage to Gautam Buddha's birthplace Lumbini, so Government of Sri Lanka has built a rest house and constructed a Buddhist monastery complex in Lumbini. Following the April 2015 Nepal earthquake, Sri Lanka was one of the first three countries to send medical and search-and-rescue teams to the country. The Sri Lanka Air Force|Aiorce sent flights of C-130 Hercules aircraft, and SriLankan Airlines sent Airbus A330 aircraft, carrying Sri Lanka Army emergency teams.
Pakistan	May 1948	See Pakistan–Sri Lanka relations
Palestine	April 1982	See Palestine–Sri Lanka relations: Palestine has very close ties to Sri Lanka.Sri Lanka has made monetary donations to Palestine on various occasions. Sri Lankan President Maithripala Sirisena also assured that Sri Lanka is committed to stand by the struggle for independence of the Palestinian people. There is an embassy for the state of Palestine in Colombo.
Philippines	17 April 1958	See Philippines–Sri Lanka relations
South Korea	14 November 1977	see South Korea–Sri Lanka relations Diplomatic relations between both nations were established on 14 November 1977. South Korean investments in Sri Lanka (cumulative total at the end of June 2014) total $731 million. The Republic of Korea has an embassy in Colombo. Sri Lanka has an embassy in Seoul.
Turkey	September 1958	See Sri Lanka–Turkey relations: Sri Lanka has an embassy in Ankara.; Turkey has an embassy in Colombo.

=== Europe ===
Country	Formal Relations Began	Notes
Croatia	14 February 1997	Foreign relations of Croatia: Sri Lanka recognised Croatia on 27 May 1992.; Both countries established diplomatic relations on 14 February 1997.; Both countries have agreed on bilateral treaties in various fields.
Cyprus	March 1981	Cyprus is accredited to Sri Lanka by its High Commission in New Delhi, India and an honorary consulate in Colombo.; Sri Lanka is accredited to Cyprus from its embassy in Rome, Italy and an honorary consulate in Larnaca.; Both countries have agreed on bilateral treaties in various fields.; Both countries are full members of Commonwealth of Nations.
Czech Republic	28 December 1957 and 15 February 1993	Historically, relations between the Czech Republic and Sri Lanka have been good, with foundations to build upon in strengthening bilateral cooperation.; There have been state visits by both sides.; The Czech Republic has a consulate in Colombo.; In 2000 Czech Republic provided RM-70 multiple rocket launchers for Sri Lanka Army.
Denmark	5 January 1953	See Denmark–Sri Lanka relations
Estonia	31 January 1996	See Estonia–Sri Lanka relations
Germany	9 December 1953	See Germany–Sri Lanka relations: Germany has an embassy in Colombo.; Sri Lanka has an embassy in Berlin.
Greece	1957	Both countries established diplomatic relations in 1957.; Greece is accredited to Sri Lanka from its embassy in New Delhi, India.; Sri Lanka is accredited to Greece from its embassy in Rome, Italy.
Holy See	6 September 1975	See Holy See–Sri Lanka relations: Formal relations Began in 1978.; The Holy See has a nunciature in Colombo. Sri Lanka has an embassy in Rome.
Hungary	15 February 1959	See Hungary–Sri Lanka relations: Sri Lanka has an embassy in Vienna, Austria that is accredited to Hungary. and has a consul in Budapest; Hungary maintains a consulate in Colombo.; Relations are low-keyed, but there are no outstanding issues. Hungary contributed to relief after the 2004 Indian Ocean tsunami and has since stepped up aid to Sri Lanka.
Romania	15 September 1957	See Romania–Sri Lanka relations The Romanian Ambassador in New Delhi is concurrently accredited to Sri Lanka, and the Sri Lanka Mission in Warsaw, Poland, is concurrently accredited to Romania. The President of Sri Lanka, Chandrika Bandaranaike Kumaratunga characterized relations between the two countries in 2003 as "close and friendly". Diplomatic relations between Sri Lanka and Romania were established on 15 September 1957. They werre initially maintained at Legation level but were raised to ambassadorial level in 1967. In 1963, Romania opened a commercial office in Colombo, which was upgraded to as embassy in 1976 with a chargé d'affaires. The Romanian Mission in Colombo was closed in 1995 but reopened as a commercial office in 1998. In 1978, the Sri Lankan minister of Foreign Affairs visited Romania. Romania provided 32,000 euros worth of humanitarian aid to Sri Lanka after it was devastated by the December 2004 Indian Ocean tsunami in December 2004. The ambassador designate of Sri Lanka in Bucharest was Clarence Felician Chinniah until his death, in January 2009. In December 2009, Valerica Epure presented her credentials to President Mahinda Rajapaksa to become Ambassador-Designate of Romania to Sri Lanka. In December 2009, with the end of the civil war in Sri Lanka, 46 Sri Lankan Tamil refugees were sent to Romania to be processed for resettlement from Indonesia on their way to Australia. Bilateral trade between Sri Lanka and Romania was valued at US$8.87 million in 2007, up from US$7.9 million in 2006. Efforts have been made to expand trade in Ceylon tea to Romania. In 2009, the chairman and CEO of the Sri Lanka Export Development Board, Anil Koswatte, singled out Romania as country to which exports could be increased.
Russia	19 February 1957	See Russia–Sri Lanka relations President Mahinda Rajapaksa with Russian President Dmitry Medvedev, at St. Petersburg Economic Forum, in June 2011.: During the war between the Sri Lanka Armed Forces and the Tamil Tigers, Russia helped the Sri Lankan government by providing education on battlefield tactics to the Sri Lanka Army.; Russia has an embassy in Colombo. Sri Lanka has an embassy in Moscow.
Serbia	14 October 1957	Both countries established diplomatic relations in 1956.; A number of bilateral agreements in various fields have been concluded and are in force between both countries.; Serbia is accredited to Sri Lanka from its embassy in New Delhi, India.; Sri Lanka is accredited to Serbia from its embassy in Vienna, Austria.
Spain	10 July 1955	See Spain–Sri Lanka relations: Spain is accredited to Sri Lanka from its embassy in New Delhi, India.; Sri Lanka is accredited to Spain from its embassy in Paris, France.
Switzerland	23 January 1956	See Sri Lanka–Switzerland relations In the 1980s, political relations between Switzerland and Sri Lanka intensified, with many Sri Lankan Tamils fleeing from the Sri Lankan civil war to find asylum in Switzerland.
United Kingdom	4 February 1948	See Sri Lanka–United Kingdom relations Diplomatic relations with the United Kingdom were established on 22 October 1946.: Sri Lanka maintains a high commission in London.; The United Kingdom is accredited to Sri Lanka through its high commission in Colombo.; The UK governed Sri Lanka from 1802 to 1948, until it achieved full independence as Ceylon. Both countries share common membership of the Commonwealth and the World Trade Organization. Bilaterally the two countries have an Investment Agreement.

=== Oceania ===
Country	Formal Relations Began	Notes
Australia	4 February 1948	See Australia–Sri Lanka relations: Australia has a High Commission in Colombo.; Sri Lanka has a (High Commission) in Canberra and five consulates-general in Adelaide, Brisbane, Melbourne, Perth and Sydney.
New Zealand	14 December 1955	See Foreign relations of New Zealand New Zealand and Sri Lanka have a strong relationship since the 1800s. New Zealand has longstanding Commonwealth, migrant and sporting ties with Sri Lanka.: New Zealand has a High Commission in Colombo.; Sri Lanka is accredited to New Zealand from its high commission in Canberra, Australia.; New Zealand visits to Sri Lanka: Prime Minister John Key and Minister of Foreign Affairs Hon Murray McCully visited Sri Lanka for the 23rd Commonwealth Heads of Government Meeting 2013.; Hon Murray McCully, Minister of Foreign Affairs, June, August 2013; Sri Lankan Parliamentary Delegation attending the Commonwealth Parliamentary Association Conference, October 1998; Agriculture, Lands & Forestry Minister Jayaratne, May 1996; Minister of Foreign Affairs Vijitha Herath visits New Zealand 27–30 May 2026.

== See also ==
- List of diplomatic missions in Sri Lanka
- List of diplomatic missions of Sri Lanka
- Sri Lanka and the Non-Aligned Movement
- Sri Lankan sporting disappearances
