= List of diplomatic missions of Sri Lanka =

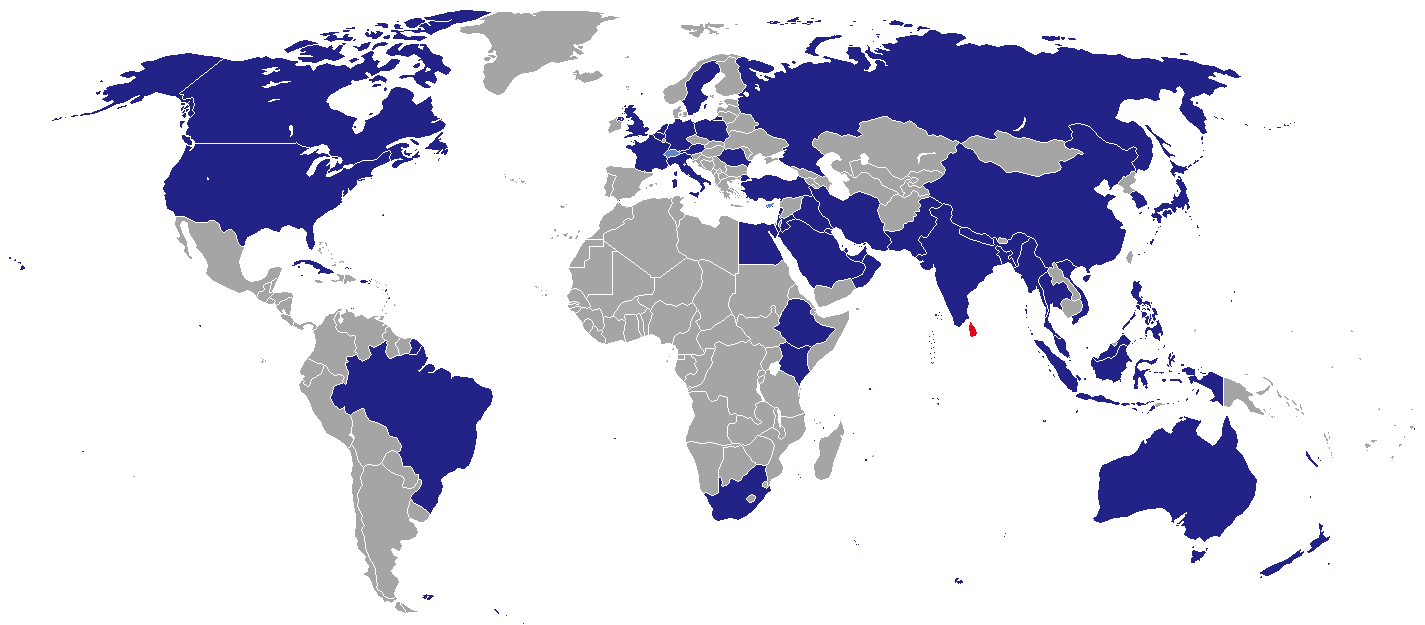
Diplomatic missions of Sri Lanka

This is a list of diplomatic missions of Sri Lanka, excluding honorary consulates. Sri Lanka has missions across almost all continents with bilateral posts (embassies and consulates) in 50 countries and states, and 2 permanent missions with the United Nations in New York City and Geneva.

== Current missions ==
=== Africa ===
Host country	Host city	Mission	Year opened	Concurrent accreditation	Ref.
Egypt	Cairo	Embassy	1958	Countries: Algeria; Eritrea; Libya; Morocco; Sudan; Tunisia	
Ethiopia	Addis Ababa	Embassy	2017	Countries: Djibouti; Somalia; South Sudan; International Organizations: African Union; United Nations Economic Commission for Africa	
Kenya	Nairobi	High Commission	1970	Countries: Benin; Burkina Faso; Congo-Brazzaville; Congo-Kinshasa; Gabon; Gambia; Ghana; Guinea; Guinea-Bissau; Ivory Coast; Liberia; Mali; Mauritania; Nigeria; Rwanda; Senegal; Sierra Leone; Tanzania; Togo; Uganda; International Organizations: United Nations; United Nations Environment Programme; United Nations Human Settlements Programme	
Seychelles	Victoria	High Commission	2013	Countries: Madagascar; Mauritius	
South Africa	Pretoria	High Commission	1997	Countries: Angola; Botswana; Eswatini; Lesotho; Malawi; Mozambique; Namibia; Zambia; Zimbabwe	

=== Americas ===
Host country	Host city	Mission	Year opened	Concurrent accreditation	Ref.
Brazil	Brasília	Embassy		Countries: Argentina; Chile; Colombia; Paraguay; Peru; Suriname; Uruguay	
Canada	Ottawa	High Commission	1958		
Canada	Toronto	Consulate-General	2001		
Cuba	Havana	Embassy	1987	Countries: Dominican Republic; Ecuador; El Salvador; Haiti; Honduras; Jamaica; Panama; Venezuela	
United States	Washington, D.C.	Embassy	1948	Countries: Trinidad and Tobago; International Organizations: Organization of American States (Note: Accredited as an observer mission.)	
United States	Los Angeles	Consulate-General	1999	Countries: Trinidad and Tobago; International Organizations: Organization of American States	

=== Asia ===
Host country	Host city	Mission	Year opened	Concurrent accreditation	Ref.
Bahrain	Manama	Embassy	2013		
Bangladesh	Dhaka	High Commission	1979		
China	Beijing	Embassy	1957	Countries: Mongolia; North Korea	
China	Guangzhou	Consulate-General	2012	Countries: Mongolia; North Korea	
China	Shanghai	Consulate-General		Countries: Mongolia; North Korea	
India	New Delhi	High Commission	1948		
India	Chennai	Deputy High Commission	1957		
India	Mumbai	Consulate-General	1983		
Indonesia	Jakarta	Embassy	1952	Countries: Timor-Leste; International Organizations: Association of Southeast Asian Nations	
Iran	Tehran	Embassy	1990	Countries: Azerbaijan; Turkmenistan	
Israel	Tel Aviv	Embassy	2000		
Japan	Tokyo	Embassy	1953		
Jordan	Amman	Embassy	1996		
Kuwait	Kuwait City	Embassy	1982		
Lebanon	Beirut	Embassy	1997	Countries: Syria	
Malaysia	Kuala Lumpur	High Commission	1957		
Maldives	Malé	High Commission	1980		
Myanmar	Yangon	Embassy	1949		
Nepal	Kathmandu	Embassy	1993		
Oman	Muscat	Embassy	1987	Countries: Yemen	
Pakistan	Islamabad	High Commission	1950	Countries: Kyrgyzstan; Tajikistan	
Pakistan	Karachi	Consulate-General		Countries: Kyrgyzstan; Tajikistan	
Palestine	Ramallah	Representative office	2007		
Philippines	Manila	Embassy	1961		
Qatar	Doha	Embassy	1997		
Saudi Arabia	Riyadh	Embassy	1981		
Saudi Arabia	Jeddah	Consulate-General	1997		
Singapore	Singapore	Embassy	1971	Countries: Brunei	
South Korea	Seoul	Embassy	1987		
Thailand	Bangkok	Embassy	1966	Countries: Cambodia; Laos; International Organizations: United Nations Economic and Social Commission for Asia and the Pacific	
Turkey	Ankara	Embassy	2012	Countries: Georgia; Ukraine	
United Arab Emirates	Abu Dhabi	Embassy	1979 (Note: Originally opened as a resident mission; was upgraded into an embassy in 1983.)		
United Arab Emirates	Dubai	Consulate-General	1993		
Vietnam	Hanoi	Embassy	2003		

=== Europe ===
Host country	Host city	Mission	Year opened	Concurrent accreditation	Ref.
Austria	Vienna	Embassy	1995	Countries: Bosnia and Herzegovina; Czechia; Hungary; Serbia; Slovakia; Slovenia; International Organizations: United Nations; CTBTO Preparatory Commission; International Atomic Energy Agency; United Nations Industrial Development Organization; United Nations Office on Drugs and Crime	
Belgium	Brussels	Embassy	1973	Countries: Luxembourg; International Organizations: European Union	
Cyprus	Nicosia	Consulate-General (Note: Subordinate to the embassy in Rome.)	2019 (Note: Was closed in 2021; reopened in 2025.)		
France	Paris	Embassy	1956	Countries: Andorra; Monaco; Portugal; Spain; International Organizations: UNESCO; UN Tourism	
Germany	Berlin	Embassy	1958 (Note: Originally opened in Bonn; was moved to Berlin in 1999.)	Countries: Croatia; Montenegro; North Macedonia; Switzerland	
Italy	Rome	Embassy	1952	Countries: Albania; Cyprus; Greece; Malta; San Marino; International Organizations: Food and Agriculture Organization; International Fund for Agricultural Development; World Food Programme	
Italy	Milan	Consulate-General	2016	Countries: Albania; Cyprus; Greece; Malta; San Marino; International Organizations: Food and Agriculture Organization; International Fund for Agricultural Development; World Food Programme	
Netherlands	The Hague	Embassy	1993	International Organizations: Organisation for the Prohibition of Chemical Weapons	
Poland	Warsaw	Embassy		Countries: Bulgaria	
Romania	Bucharest	Embassy	2024		
Russia	Moscow	Embassy	1957	Countries: Armenia; Belarus; Moldova; Uzbekistan	
Sweden	Stockholm	Embassy	1970	Countries: Denmark; Estonia; Finland; Iceland; Latvia; Lithuania; Norway	
Switzerland	Geneva	Consulate-General			
United Kingdom	London	High Commission	1948	Countries: Ireland	

=== Oceania ===
Host country	Host city	Mission	Year opened	Concurrent accreditation	Ref.
Australia	Canberra	High Commission	1949	Countries: Fiji; Papua New Guinea; Samoa; Solomon Islands; Vanuatu	
Australia	Melbourne	Consulate-General	2013	Countries: Fiji; Papua New Guinea; Samoa; Solomon Islands; Vanuatu	
New Zealand	Wellington	High Commission	2025		

=== Multilateral organizations ===
Organization	Host country	Host city	Mission	Year opened	Concurrent accreditation	Ref.
United Nations	New York City	United States	Permanent Mission		Countries: Bahamas; Guatemala	
United Nations	Geneva	Switzerland	Permanent Mission	1965	Countries: Holy See; International Organizations: World Trade Organization	

== Gallery ==
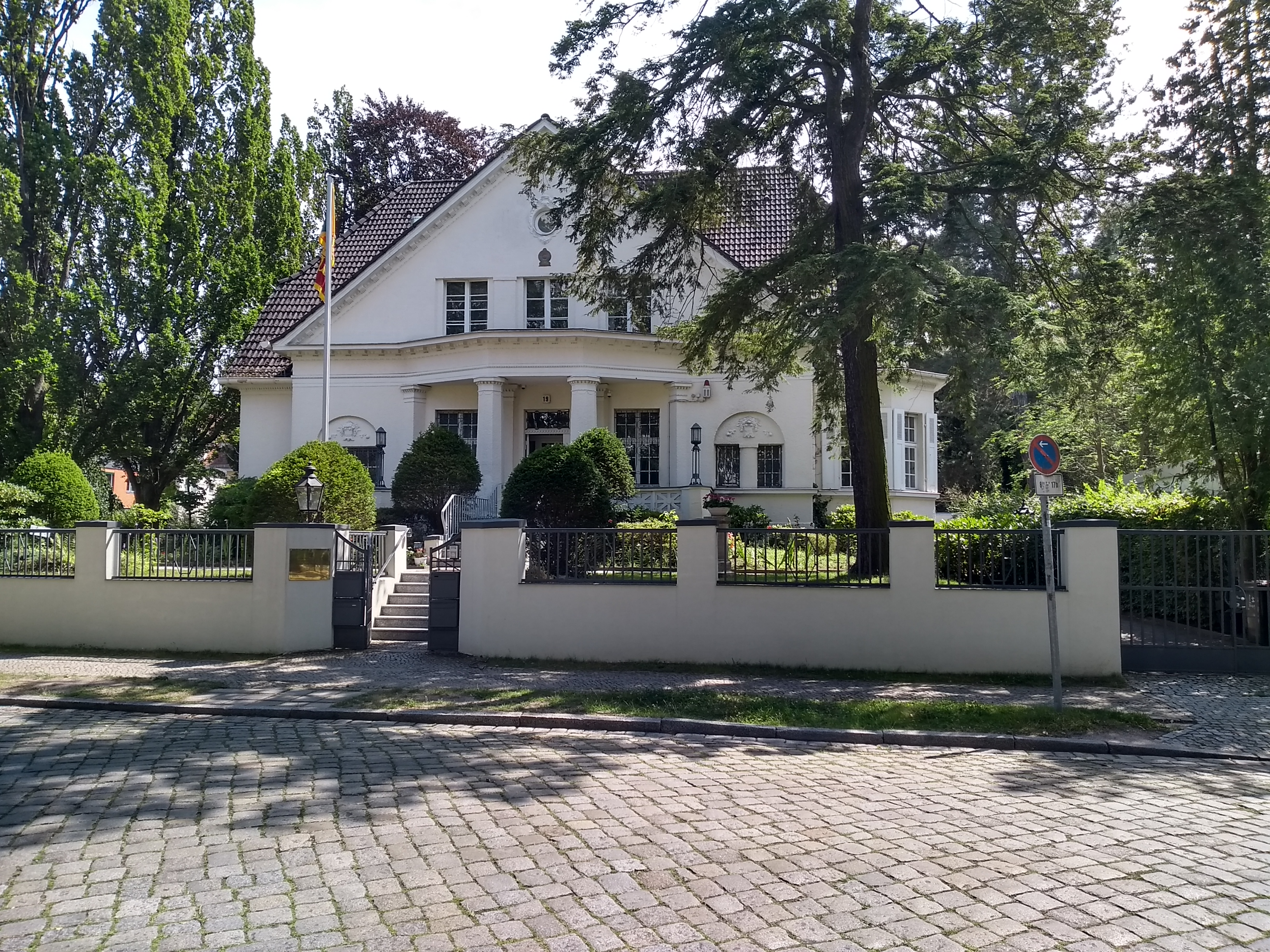
Embassy in Berlin

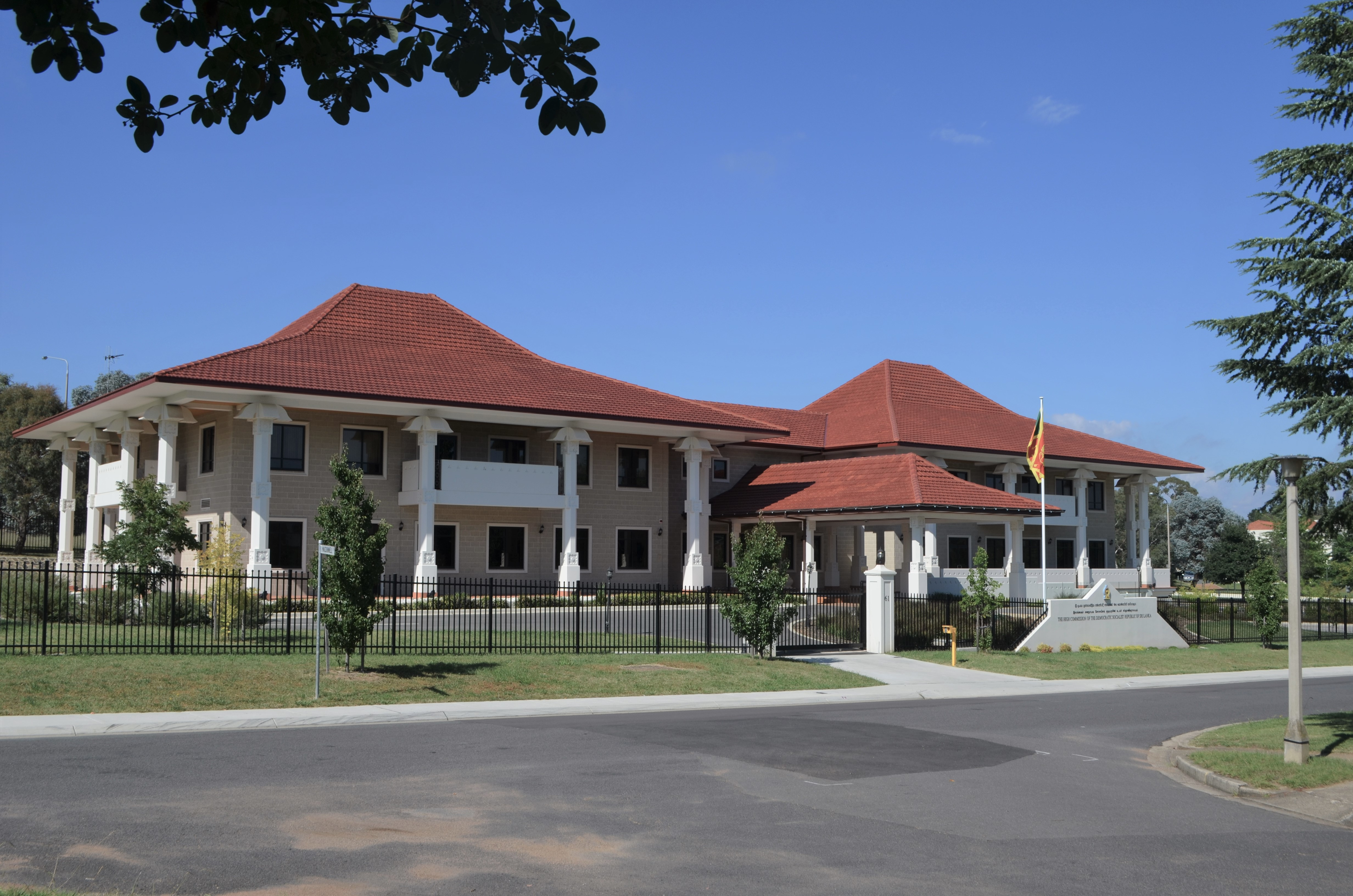
High Commission in Canberra

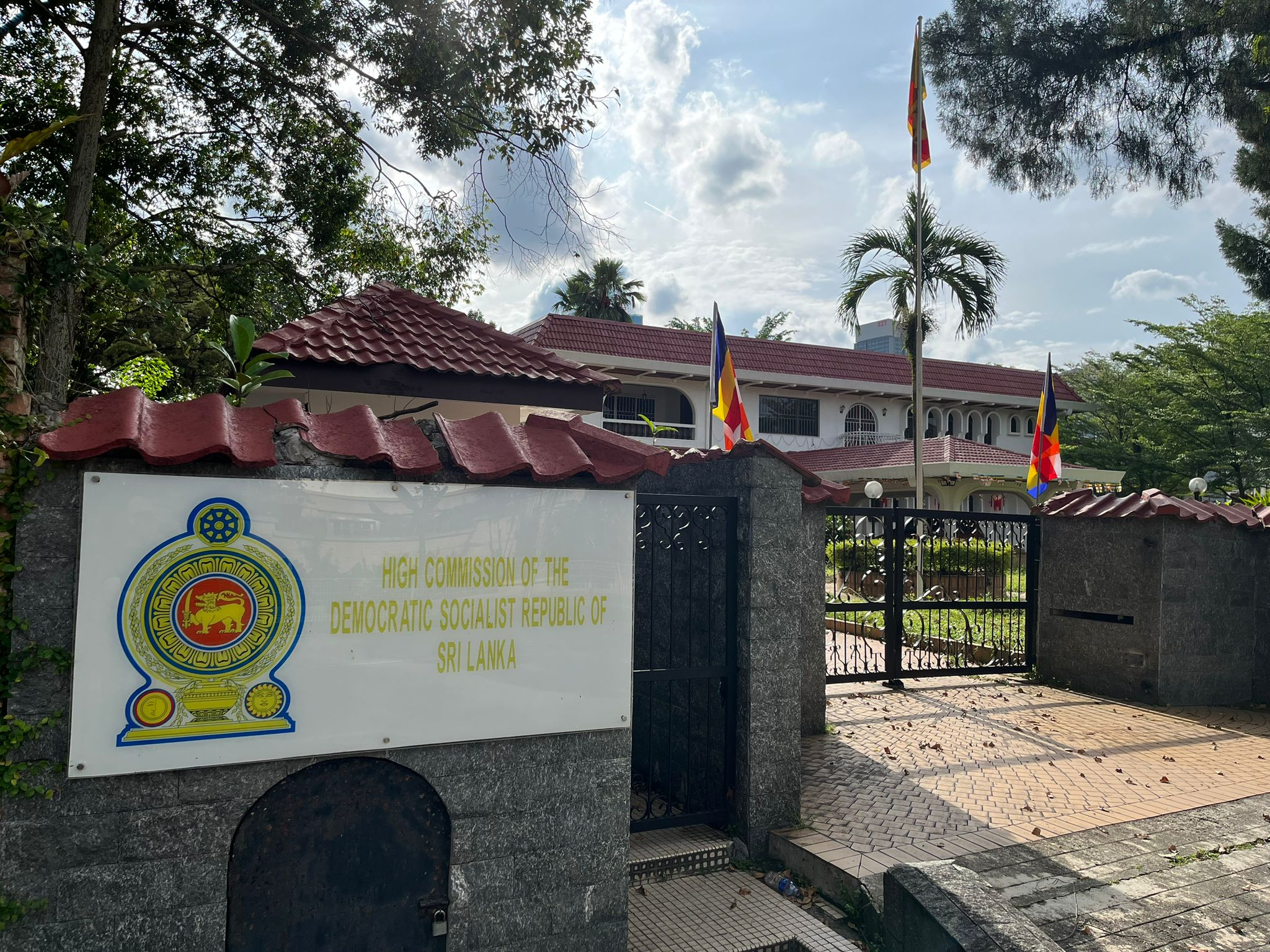
High Commission in Kuala Lumpur

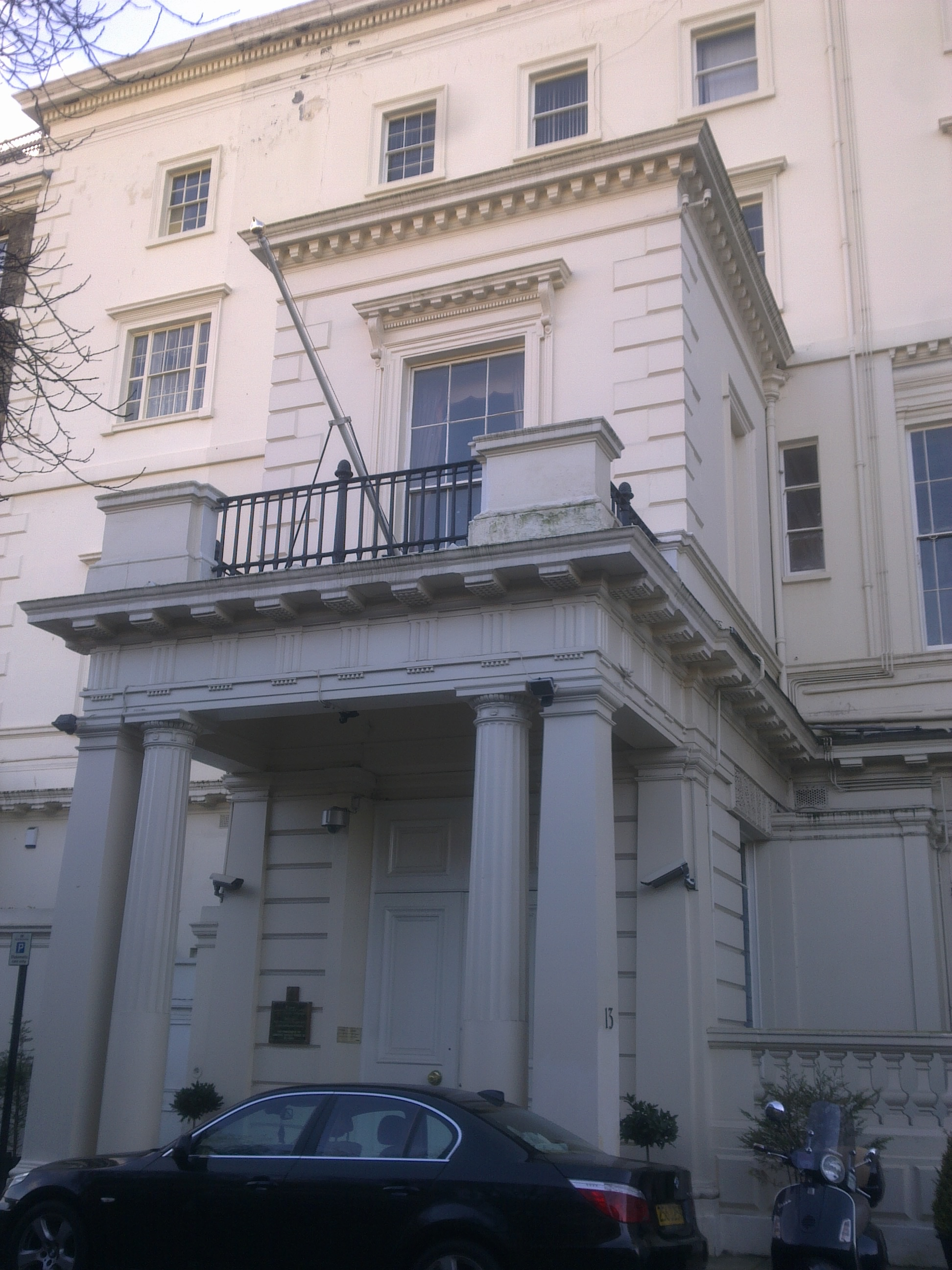
High Commission in London

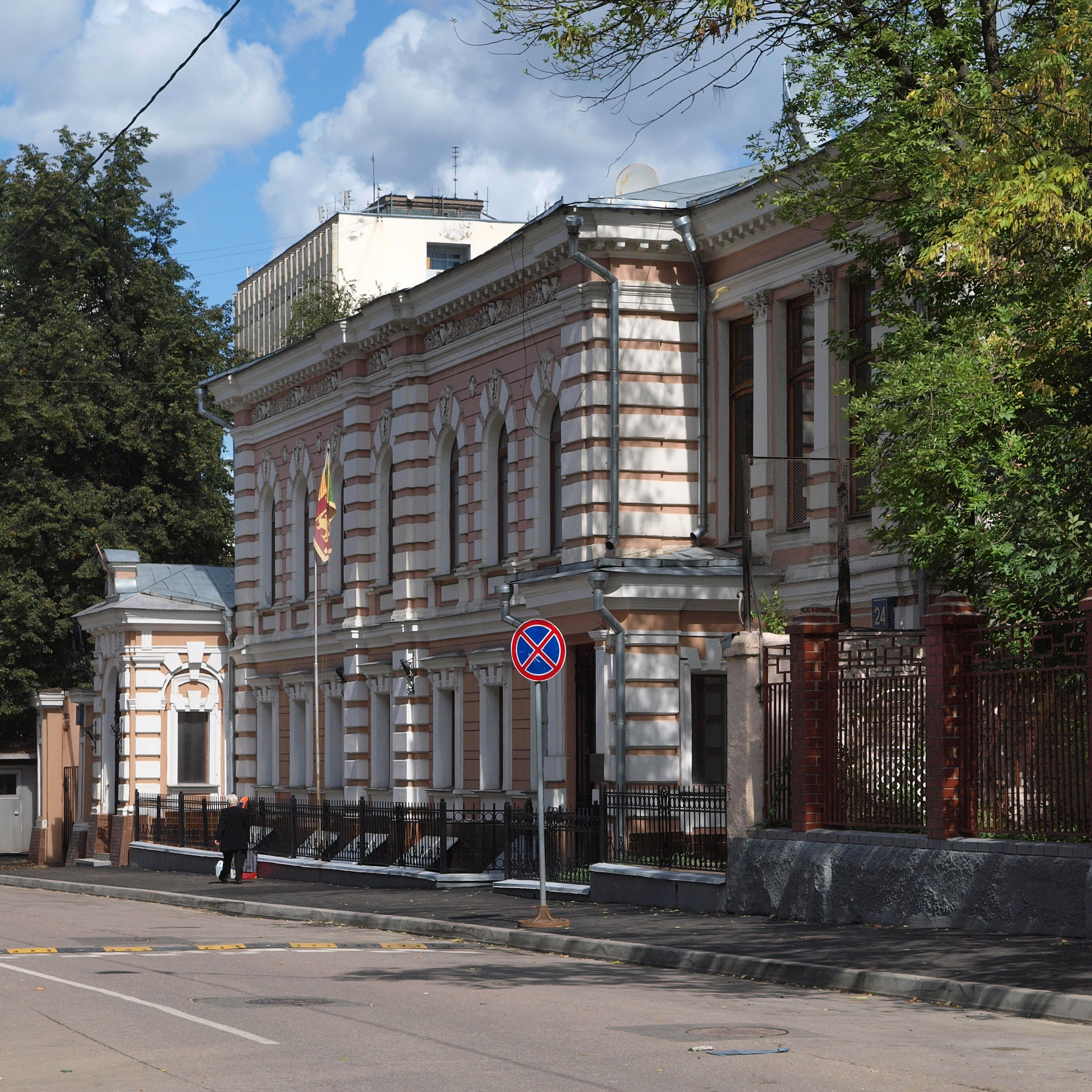
Embassy in Moscow

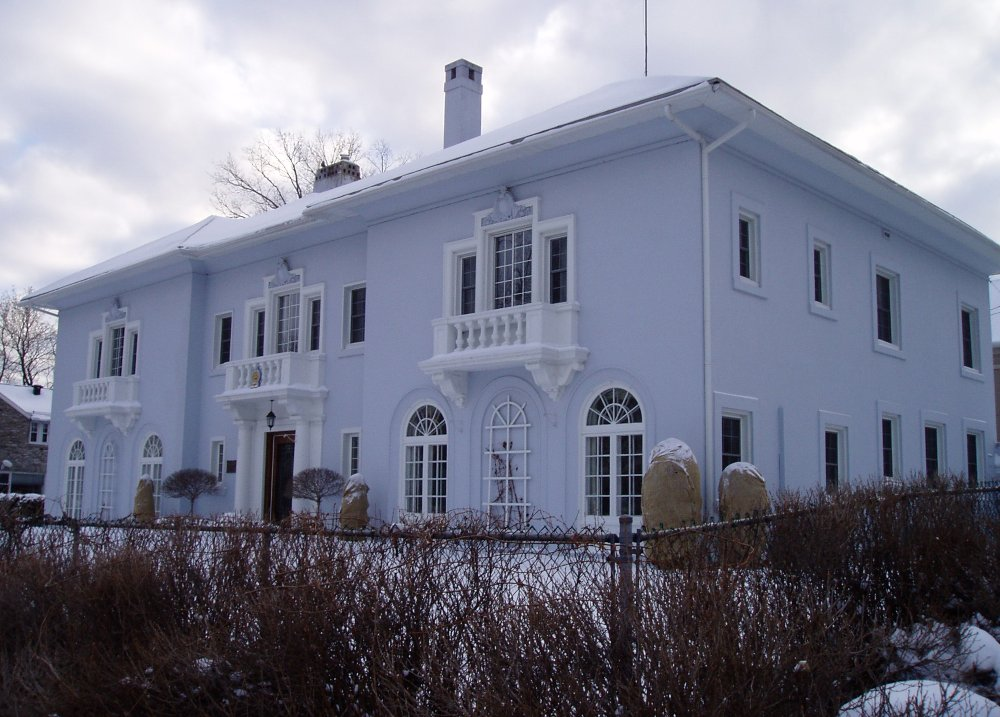
Residence of the High Commissioner in Ottawa

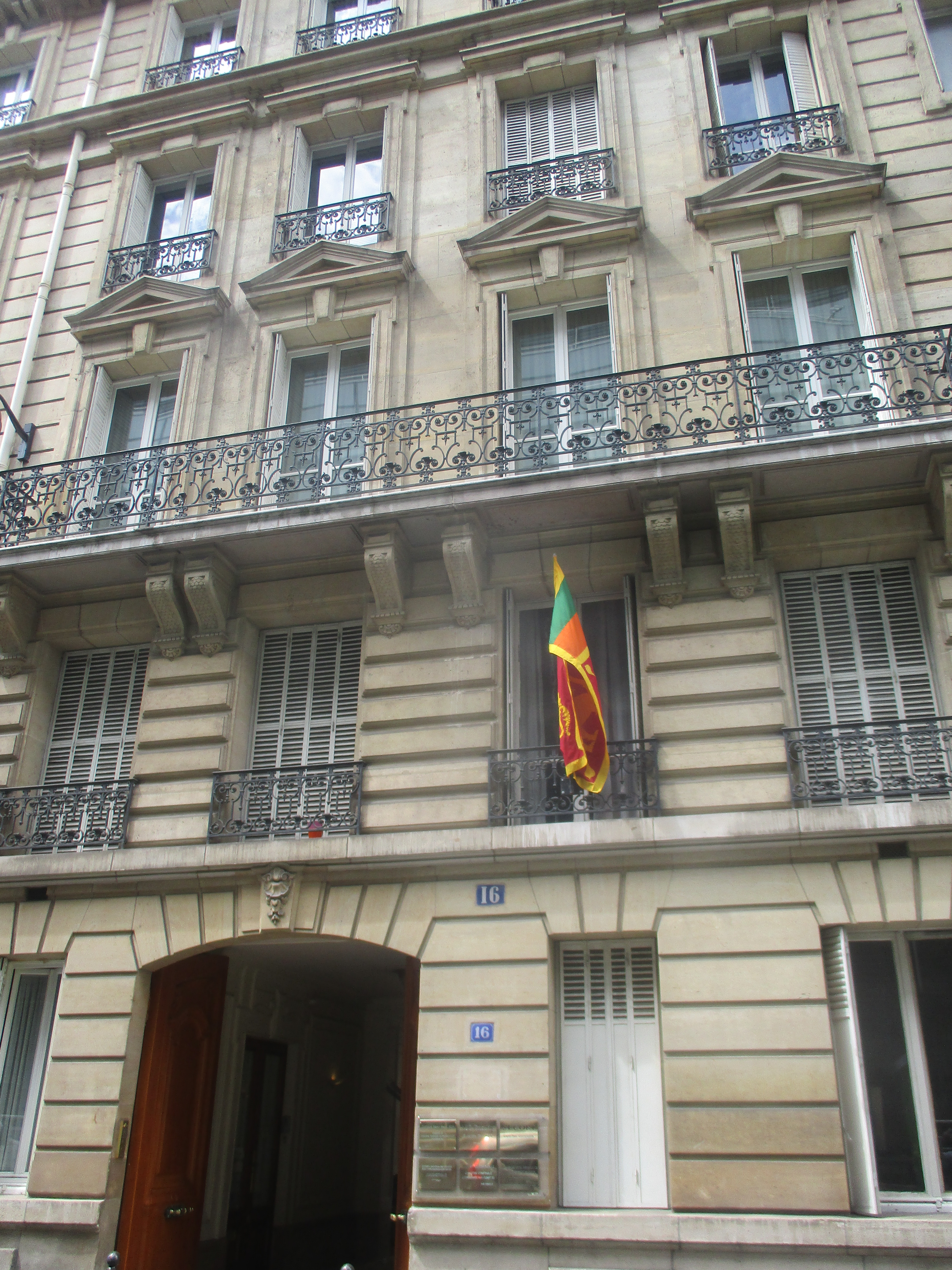
Embassy in Paris

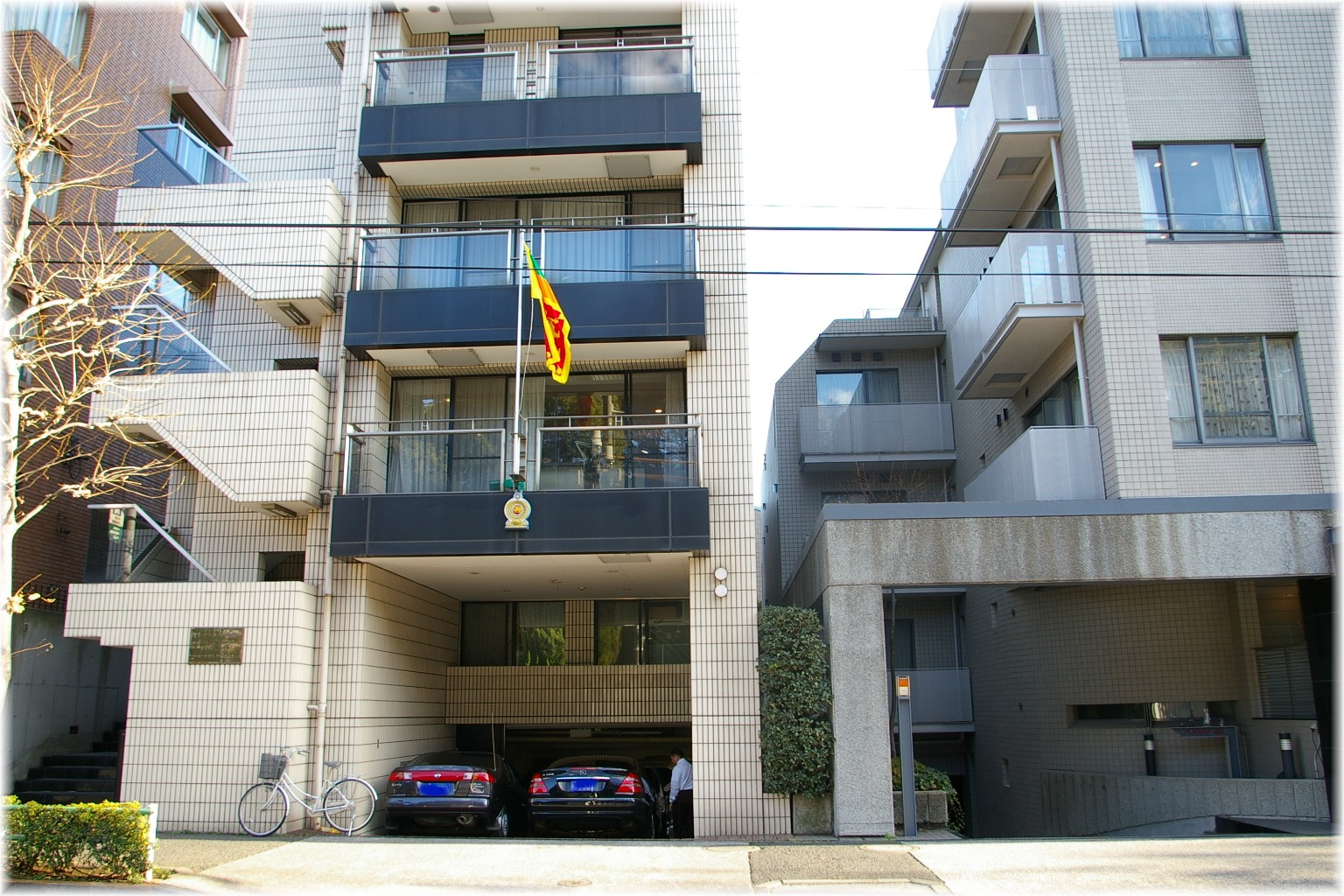
Embassy in Tokyo

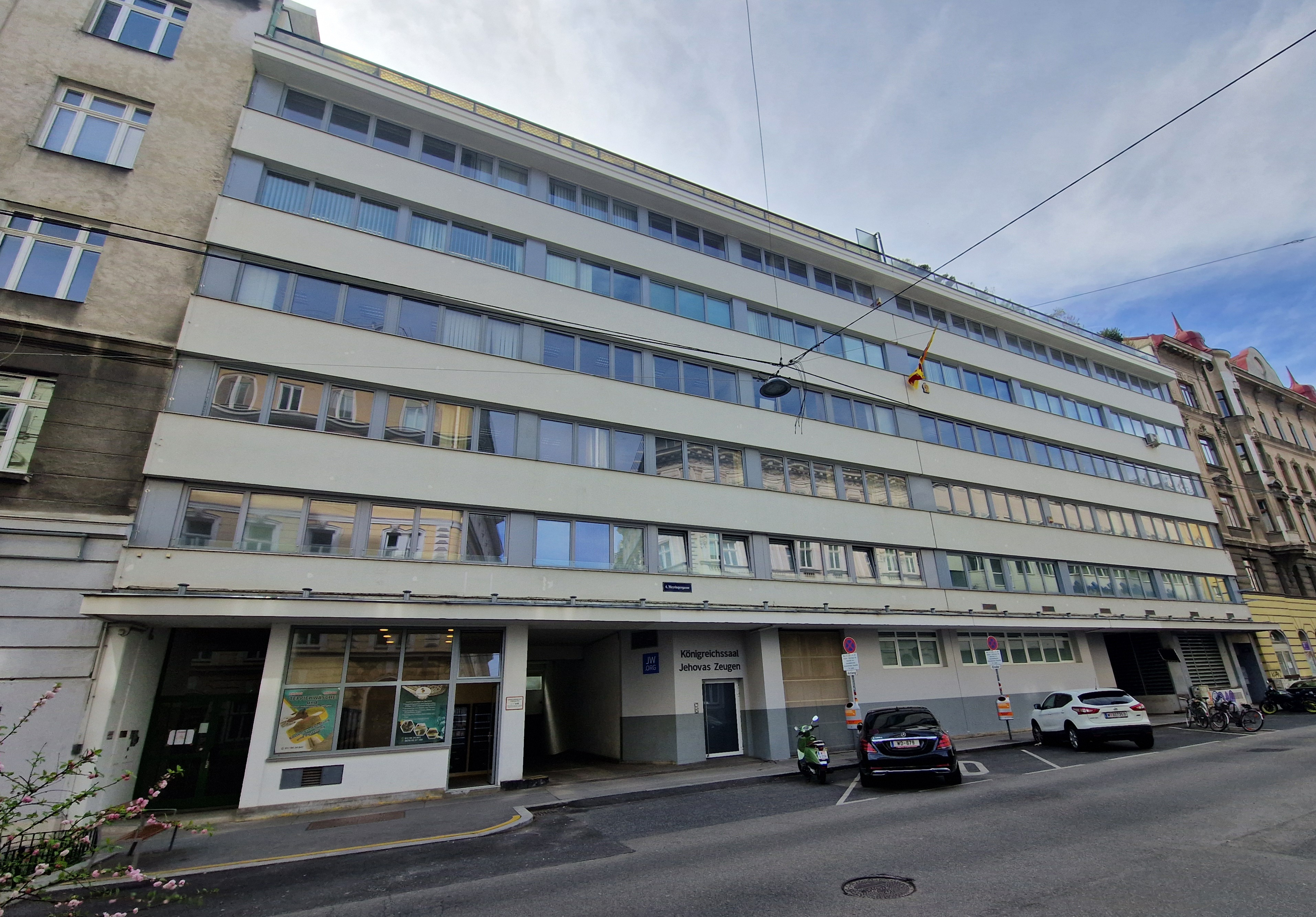
Embassy in Vienna

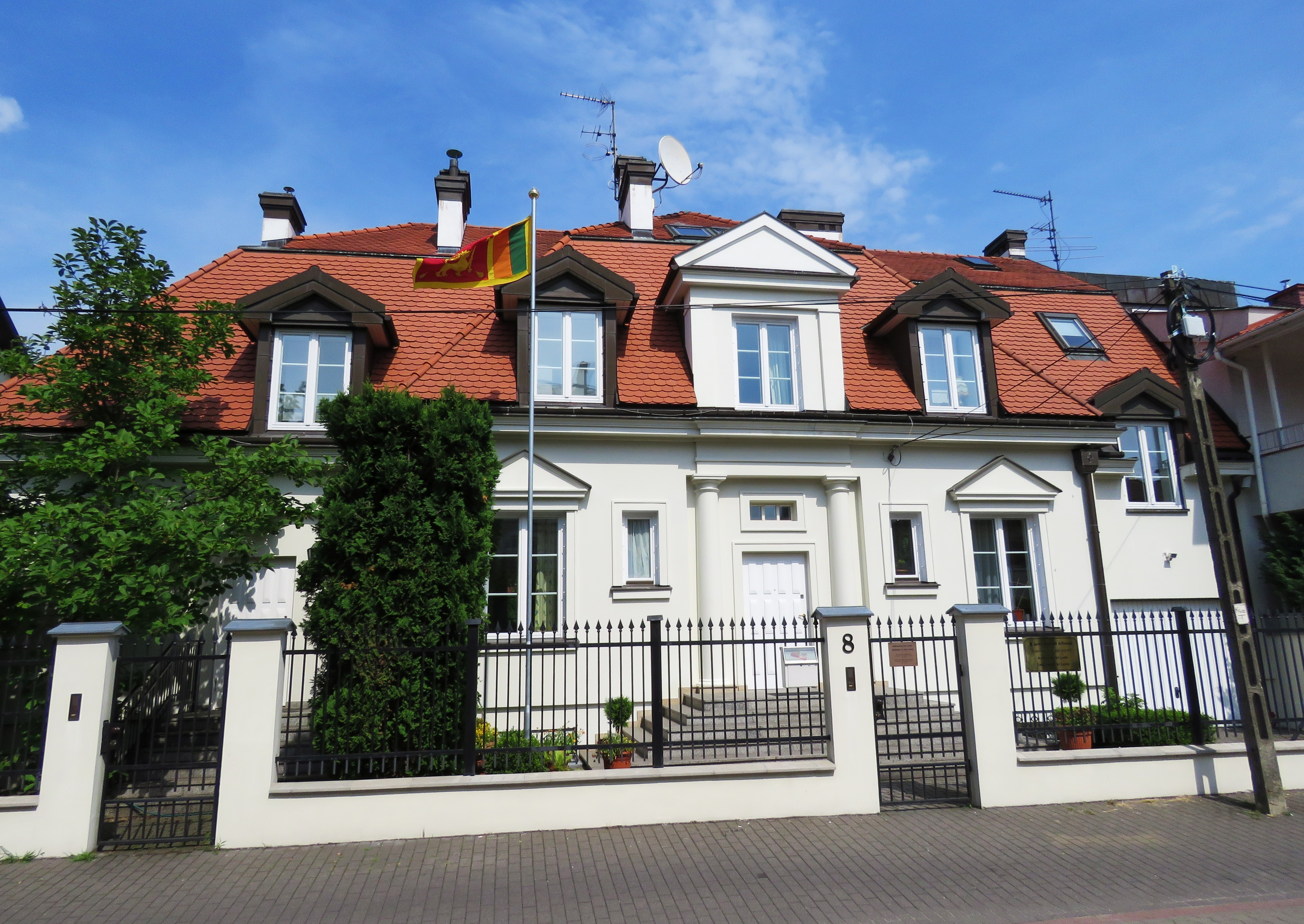
Embassy in Warsaw

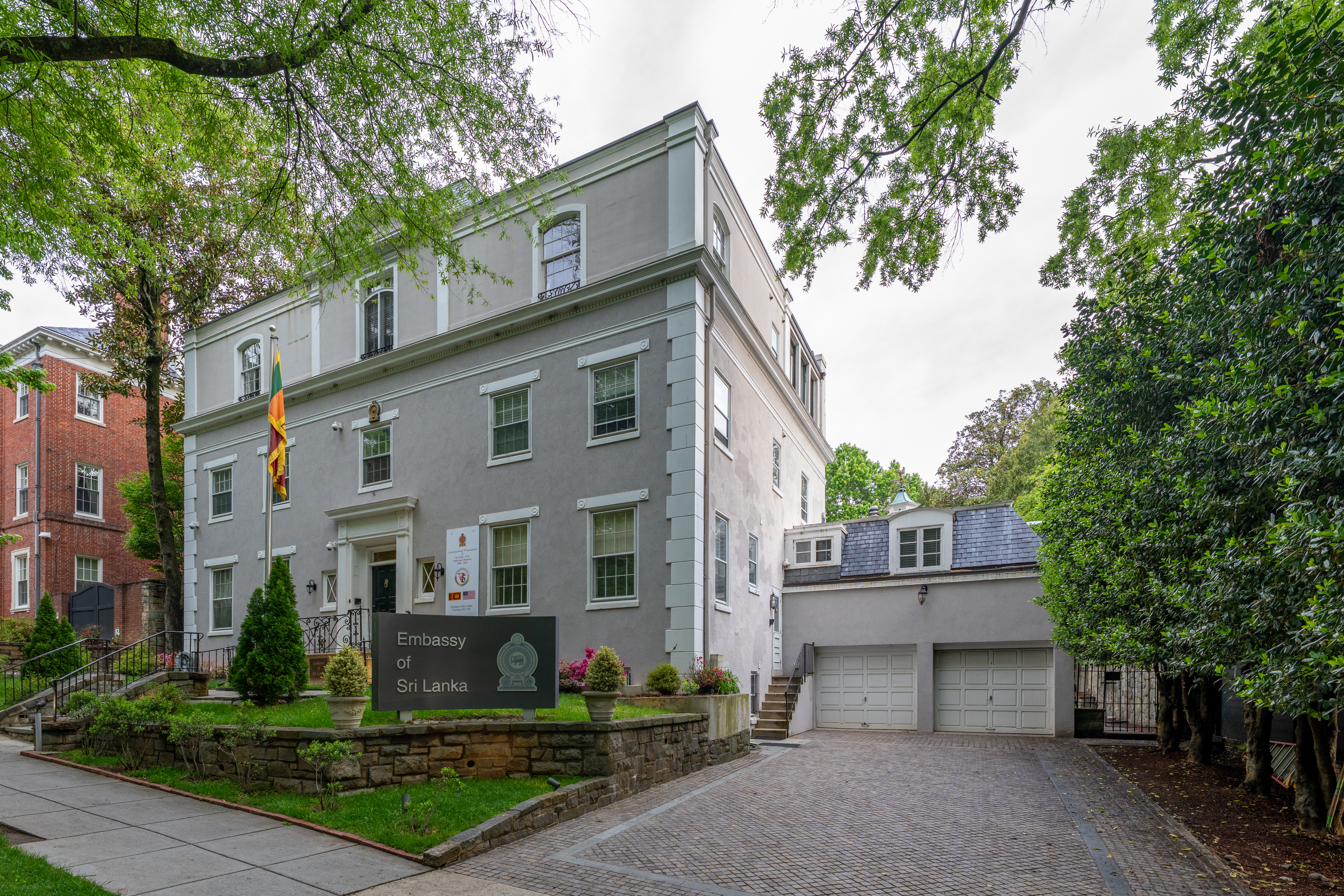
Embassy in Washington, D.C.

== Closed missions ==
=== Africa ===
Host country	Host city	Mission	Year opened	Year closed	Ref.
Libya	Tripoli	Embassy (Note: Resident in Cairo, Egypt)	2009	2011	
Nigeria	Abuja	High Commission (Note: Resident in Nairobi, Kenya)	2013	2021	

=== Asia ===
Host country	Host city	Mission	Year opened	Year closed	Ref.
Afghanistan	Kabul	Embassy	2014	2022	
Iraq	Baghdad	Embassy (Note: To be reopened.)		2022	

=== Europe ===
Host country	Host city	Mission	Year opened	Year closed	Ref.f
Germany	Frankfurt	Consulate-General	2007	2021	
Norway	Oslo	Embassy (Note: Resident in Stockholm, Sweden)		2022	

=== Oceania ===
Host country	Host city	Mission	Year opened	Year closed	Ref.
Australia	Sydney	Consulate-General	1999	2022	

== See also ==
- Foreign relations of Sri Lanka
- List of diplomatic missions in Sri Lanka
- List of heads of missions from Sri Lanka
