= Soviet Union–Sri Lanka relations =

Soviet Union-Sri Lanka relations
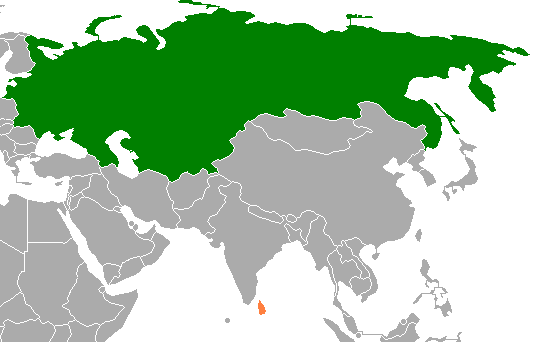

- Soviet Union: Sri Lanka

Diplomatic relations between the Soviet Union and Sri Lanka were established in 1956 under the leadership of prime minister S. W. R. D. Bandaranaike.

During the rule of the Sri Lanka Freedom Party, the country began moving towards a foreign policy of neutrality and non-alignment, thus the prime minister established strong diplomatic ties with the Soviet Bloc to counter the pro-Western policy of opposing the United National Party.

The Soviet Union granted 120 million LKR in economic aid to prime minister Bandaranaike shortly after establishing diplomatic ties. Total foreign aid received from the USSR during his tenure rose up to 355.9 million LKR, exceeding the total amount of aid given from capitalist nations.

Relations ended in 1991 following the dissolution of the Soviet Union.

== See also ==
- Russia–Sri Lanka relations
