= Hungary–Sri Lanka relations =

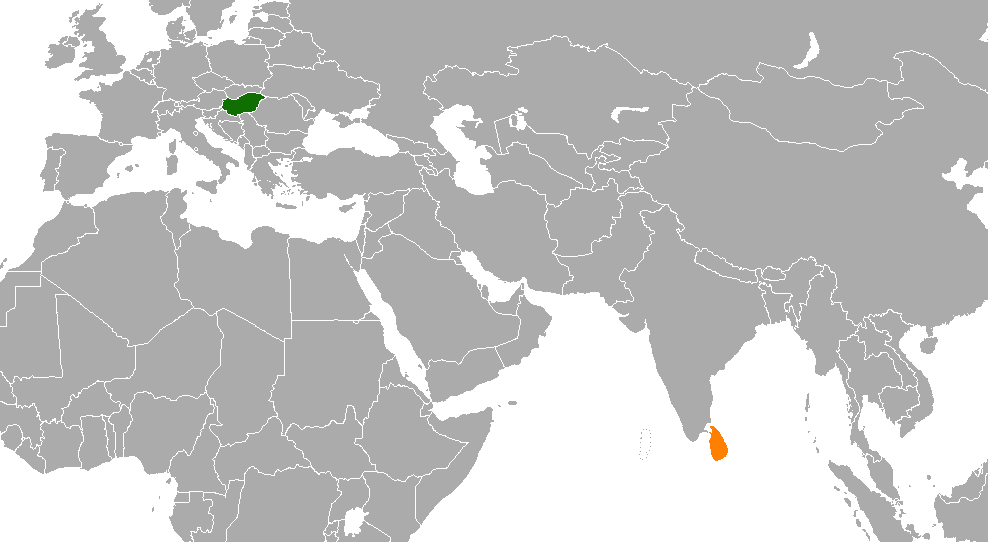

- Hungary: Sri Lanka

Hungary–Sri Lanka relations are foreign relations between Hungary and Sri Lanka. Sri Lanka has an embassy in Vienna, Austria that is accredited to Hungary and has a consulate in Budapest. Hungary maintains a consulate in Colombo, Sri Lanka.

== History ==
Diplomatic relations started on February 15, 1959 at the ambassadorial level. Razik Zarook was the first ambassador. T. B. Ilangaratne, the Sri Lankan Minister for Foreign Affairs, was the first prestigious person who visited Hungary from Sri Lanka in 1964. Since then the two countries have exchanged occasional high-level visits. In 1975, the two countries signed an Agreement on Technological and Scientific Cooperation, and in 1979 they signed a Cultural Cooperation Agreement.

In June 2004, the Sri Lankan Finance Minister Dr. Sarath Amunugama said that trade exchanges and the bilateral agreements between Sri Lanka and Hungary were beneficial to both countries, and vowed to establish a sustainable link with Hungary.

In November 2006, officials of the Ministry of Finance visited Hungary. The meeting resulted in finalizing of a Framework Agreement for Financial Cooperation with Hungary, worth Euro51 million. The agreement was signed in February 2007. In August 2008 Dr. Géza Pálmai, Ambassador for Hungary, visited Sri Lanka and met with the President Mahinda Rajapaksa and the Foreign Minister Rohitha Bogollagama. They discussed enhanced bilateral relations, investment by Hungarian companies in Sri Lanka, improvements in trade and tourism, and Hungarian investment in infrastructure development projects in Sri Lanka.

Between 20 and 22 April 2009, a delegation of Sri Lankan business people met with their counterparts in Budapest to discuss trade opportunities. Addressing the meeting, Export Development and International Trade Minister G.L. Peiris said the advent of a stable peace removes the main impediment to economic development and makes available a wide range of opportunities for trade and investment. In reply, Gyorgy Kapati of the Chamber of Commerce of Hungary said that the Hungarian business sector considers the developing situation in Sri Lanka particularly conducive to investment

== Development aid ==
Hungary contributed to relief after the 2004 Indian Ocean earthquake and tsunami, and has since stepped up aid to Sri Lanka.

Hungary has contributed to relief and reconstruction efforts after the tsunami in Sri Lanka and other countries. This included a contribution of wheat flour valued at US$55,000. Hungary also sent doctors and medicine to assist the survivors. Private donations contributed to construction of a 100-housing unit village.

In 2009, the Hungarian government planned to invest 2,850 million rupees (about USD24 million) for construction and supply of sophisticated machinery for a sea sand plant in Kalutara, Sri Lanka.

== Resident diplomatic missions ==
- Hungary is accredited to Sri Lanka from its embassy in New Delhi, India.
- Sri Lanka is accredited to Hungary from its embassy in Vienna, Austria.

== See also ==
- Foreign relations of Hungary
- Foreign relations of Sri Lanka
