= Sri Lanka–Turkey relations =

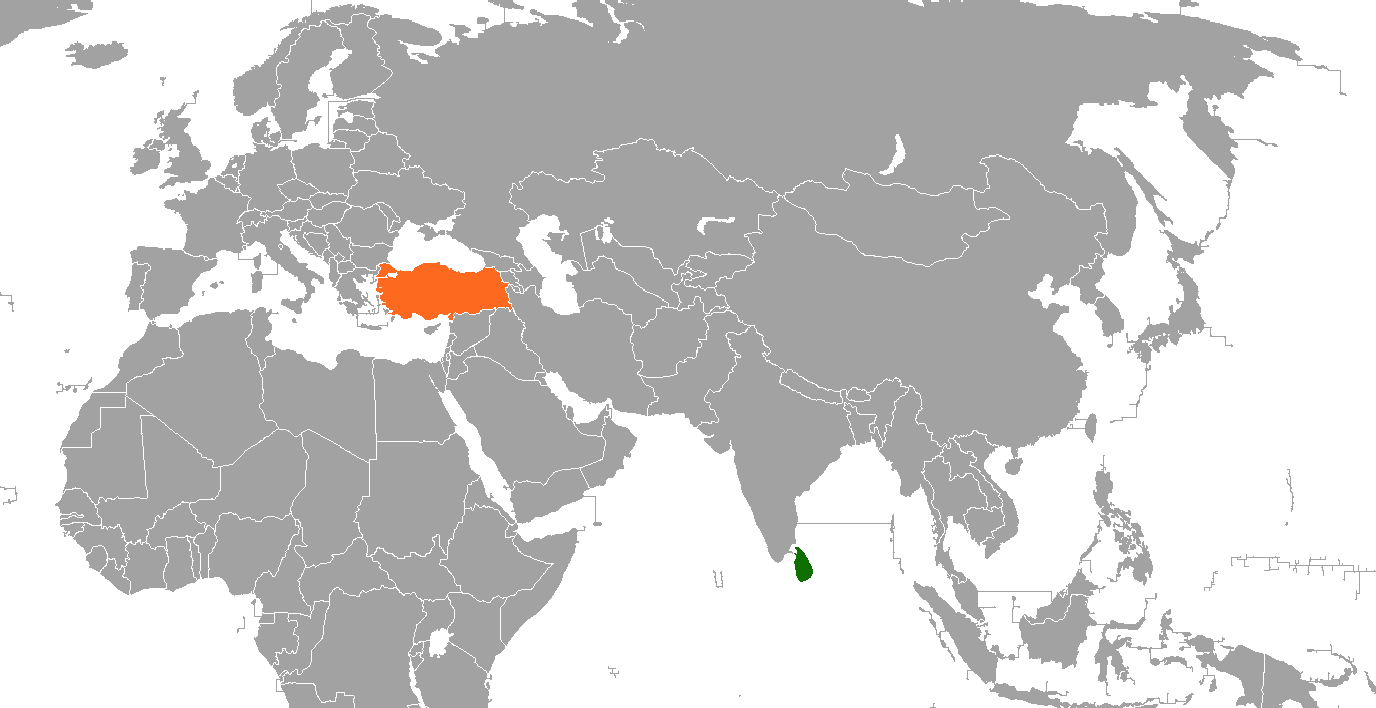

- Sri Lanka: Turkey

Sri Lanka–Turkey relations are the foreign relations between Sri Lanka and Turkey. Turkey has an embassy in Colombo since 2013. Sri Lanka has an embassy in Ankara since 2012.

== History ==
The relations between Sri Lanka and Turkey existed before the founding of both modern-day nations. Turkey's first formal relations with Sri Lanka began with the Ottoman Empire's assignment to the honorary consul of Sri Lanka in Galle in 1864 and until 1915, Ottoman honorary consuls served in Sri Lanka.

== Diplomatic relations ==
Turkey has historically been supportive of Sri Lanka's commitment to nonalignment. Relations have generally been very friendly — especially with the United National Party governments, such as the J. R. Jayewardene government that gave Sri Lanka's foreign policy a decidedly Western orientation. Prior to that, relations were tense with the Sri Lanka Freedom Party government under Sirimavo Bandaranaike, who deeply mistrusted the West and cultivated relations with China instead.

Then Prime Minister Recep Tayyip Erdoğan visited Sri Lanka after the 2004 Indian Ocean earthquake and tsunami.

== Economic relations ==
Turkey is one of the largest importers of Ceylon Tea.

== Defence relations ==
In January 2026 Turkey offered to sell Unmanned Aerial Vehicles to Sri Lanka and in July it was announced that a technical team would arrive in Sri Lanka for a presentation on Turkish drones after which Sri Lanka can send teams to Turkey to explore options.

== Presidential visits ==
Guest	Host	Place of visit	Date of visit
(Turkey) Prime Minister Recep Tayyip Erdoğan	(Sri Lanka) Prime Minister Mahinda Rajapaksa	Temple Trees, Colombo	February 10, 2005
(Sri Lanka) Prime Minister Mahinda Rajapaksa	(Turkey) President Abdullah Gül	Çankaya Köşkü, Ankara	2008

== Economic relations ==
- Trade volume between the two countries was US$185.7 million in 2019 (Turkish exports/imports: US$84.3/101.4 million).

== See also ==
- Foreign relations of Sri Lanka
- Foreign relations of Turkey
