= Iraq–Sri Lanka relations =

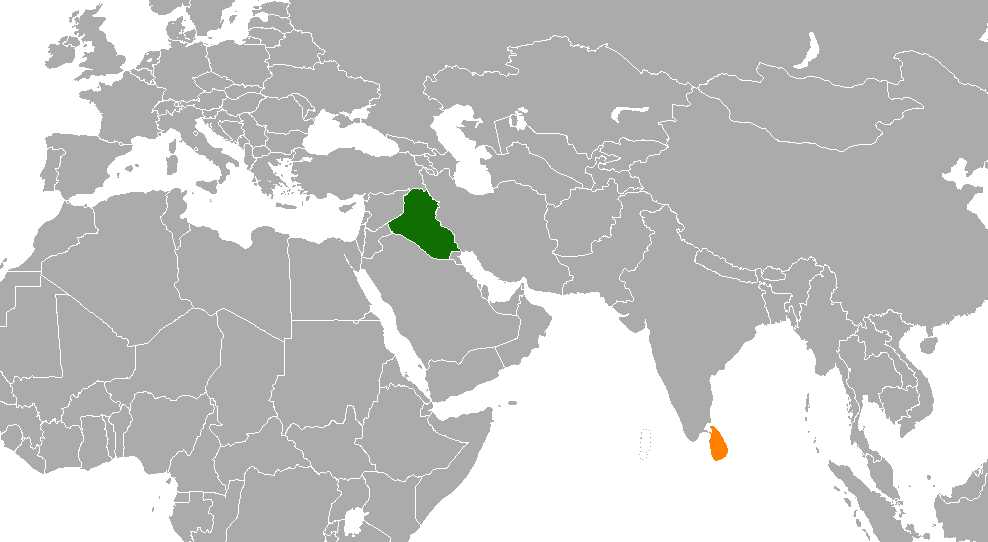

- Iraq: Sri Lanka

Iraq–Sri Lanka relations describe diplomatic and other relations between the nations of Iraq and Sri Lanka. The countries were historically close under the Iraqi Ba'athist regime. Iraq was the largest buyer of Sri Lankan tea during the reign of Saddam Hussein. Ties between Sri Lanka and Iraq were disrupted during the Iraq War. However, in 2018, Iraq re-emerged as the largest buyer of Sri Lankan tea. Sri Lanka has an embassy in Baghdad and Iraq has an embassy in Colombo.

== History ==
In the late 1970s, Sri Lanka suffered from the increased prices of oil brought about by OPEC. Sri Lankan foreign reserves shrank, creating an oil crisis. In 1975, Prime Minister Sirimavo Bandaranaike went to Iraq to discuss the issue with Hussein. Hussein agreed to supply 250,000 tons of oil on a four-year deferred payment basis, at a low rate of interest to Sri Lanka. When a cyclone hit a village in Sri Lanka, local authorities asked Hussein for help. He readily obliged, and sponsored the construction of an entire village with some 100 houses and a school. Grateful families living in the village hung his picture in their houses out of respect. When sanctions were imposed on Iraq, Sri Lanka took advantage of the Oil-for-Food Programme and continued exporting tea to Iraq, donating 100 tons of it. Hussein's execution caused widespread anger and protest among Sri Lankans.

== See also ==
- Foreign relations of Iraq
- Foreign relations of Sri Lanka
- Saddam Hussein Nagar, Sri Lanka, a town in Sri Lanka named after former Iraqi President, Saddam Hussain.
