= Kenya–Sri Lanka relations =

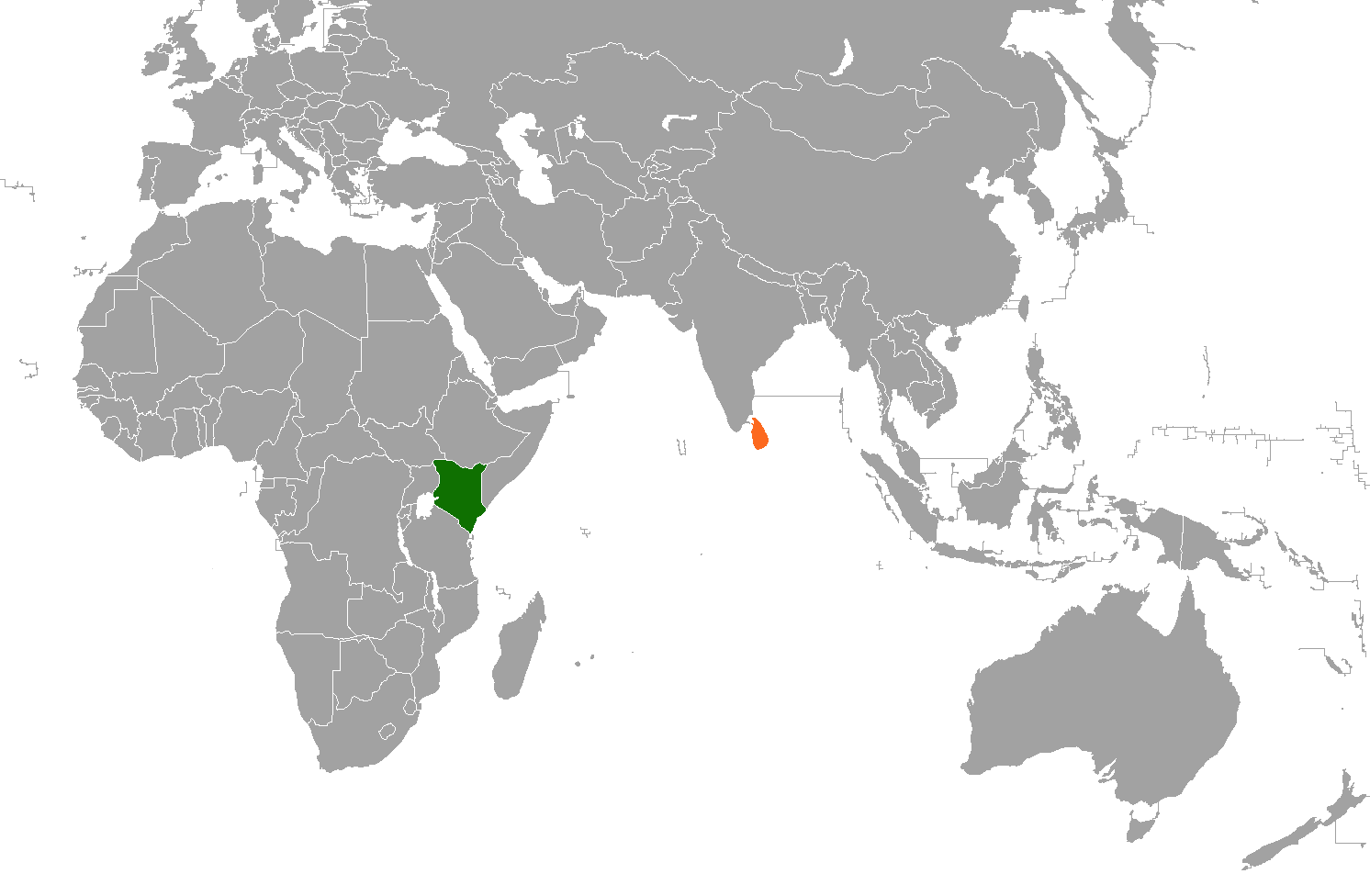

- Kenya: Sri Lanka

Kenya–Sri Lanka relations are bilateral relations between Kenya and Sri Lanka. Both countries are members of the Commonwealth of Nations. Sri Lanka has a high commission in Nairobi. Kenya has a non resident high commissioner in New Delhi.

== History ==
Both Sri Lanka and Kenya have a common history going back to the ages of the British Empire where Sri Lanka (formerly Ceylon) was ruled from 1815 to 1948 and Kenya (as the East Africa Protectorate) ruled from 1895 to 1920 and again as the Kenya Colony from 1920 to 1963. Diplomatic relations between Sri Lanka and Kenya was established in 1970. Nairobi serves as the main communication and financial center of the African Great Lakes.

Both countries signed a Bilateral Air Services Agreement BASA agreement that allows direct flights between both countries by airlines owned by firms originating from either one of the countries.

In 2013, President of Sri Lanka Mahinda Rajapaksa made a state visit to Kenya. He had talks with Uhuru Kenyatta, President of Kenya. During his visit both countries agreed to improve security on sea lanes. They also agreed to improve shipping and port connectivity between their respective countries. In 2019, President Maithripala Sirisena visited Kenya to participate United Nation Environment Assembly in Nairobi.

== Trade ==
In 2013, trade between both countries was valued at US$13.94 million, up from US$12.78 million in 2012. In 2014, trade between both countries between January and June was valued at US$5.86 million.

Kenya's main exports to Sri Lanka include: natural sodium carbonate, salt, pepper and tea which is imported by Sri Lanka for blending purposes. The tea is usually 35% Sri Lankan and 65% Kenyan.

Sri Lanka's exports to Kenya in 2013 consisted of: natural rubber, tyres, sacks and bags, staple fibre, tea, rice, coconut coir and activated carbon.

Two large Sri Lankan companies have operations in Kenyan Export Processing Zones, there are also some IT companies in Kenya.

== See also ==
- Foreign relations of Kenya
- Foreign relations of Sri Lanka
