= Spain–Sri Lanka relations =

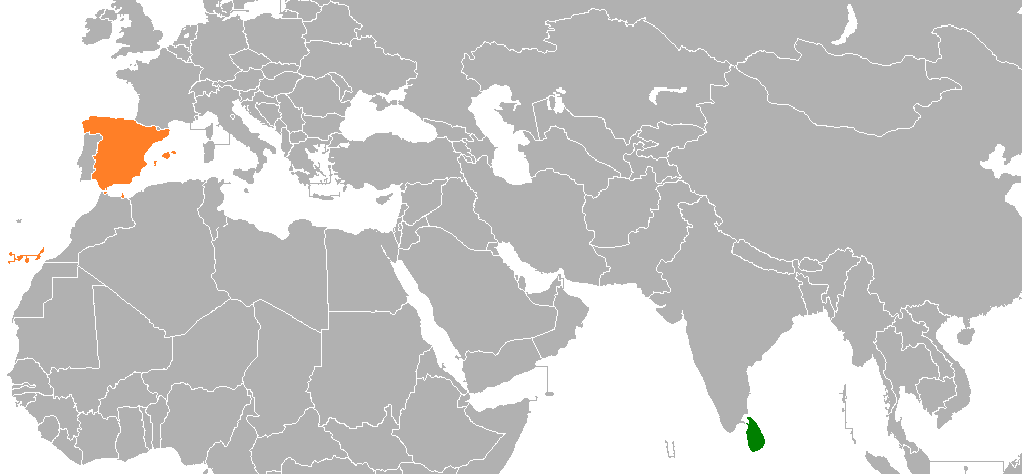

- Spain: Sri Lanka

Spain–Sri Lanka relations are the bilateral relations between Spain and Sri Lanka. Sri Lanka does not have an embassy in Spain, but has a plenipotent ambassador for affairs with Spain in Paris, France, but it has consulates in Barcelona and Madrid. Spain has an embassy in Colombo

== History ==
Spain has had diplomatic relations with Sri Lanka since 10 July 1955. Reciprocal visits include that of the President of Sri Lanka to Spain on 29 August 1979. As well as that the Spanish Foreign Minister Miguel Ángel Moratinos, who traveled to Colombo in January 2005, during a tour of the Asian countries most affected by the Indonesian tsunami of 26 December 2004.

The Spanish Government, within the framework of the European Union, has supported from the beginning efforts to reach a peaceful solution to the Sri Lankan ethnic problem, and has encouraged Sri Lankan political forces to reach a national consensus on the basis of a peace plan with the Liberation Tigers of Tamil Eelam (LTTE). It has also supported the country's rehabilitation assistance program.

== Cooperation ==
Spain has not initiated, for the moment, projects at the level of the central government in the field of development cooperation in Sri Lanka. There is no TBT established in the country to manage cooperation, nor are regional cooperation agencies at the Autonomous Community level.

Spanish cooperation in the country is managed multilaterally through different international organizations involved in existing cooperation projects in Sri Lanka, most of which are inserted into the UN system.

There are several international organizations for cooperation in Sri Lanka with Spanish participation: UNDP, United Nations Population Fund, UNIFEM, UNIDO, UNAIDS, UNESCO, UNICEF, UNHCR, FAO, World Food Program, ILO, World Bank, IMF, International Committee of the Red Cross. In addition there are 9 Spanish NGOs acting in Sinhalese territory.

== See also ==
- Foreign relations of Spain
- Foreign relations of Sri Lanka
