= Estonia–Sri Lanka relations =

Bilateral relations of Estonia and Sri Lanka

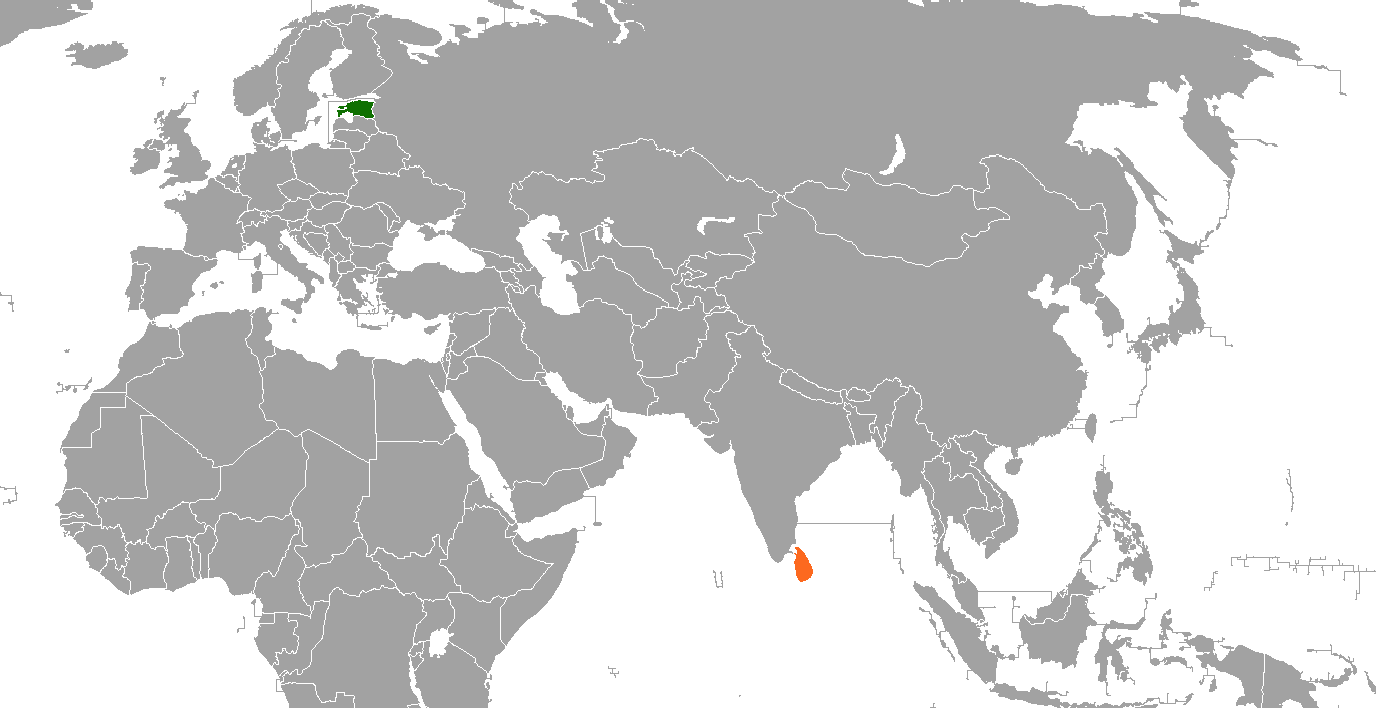

- Estonia: Sri Lanka

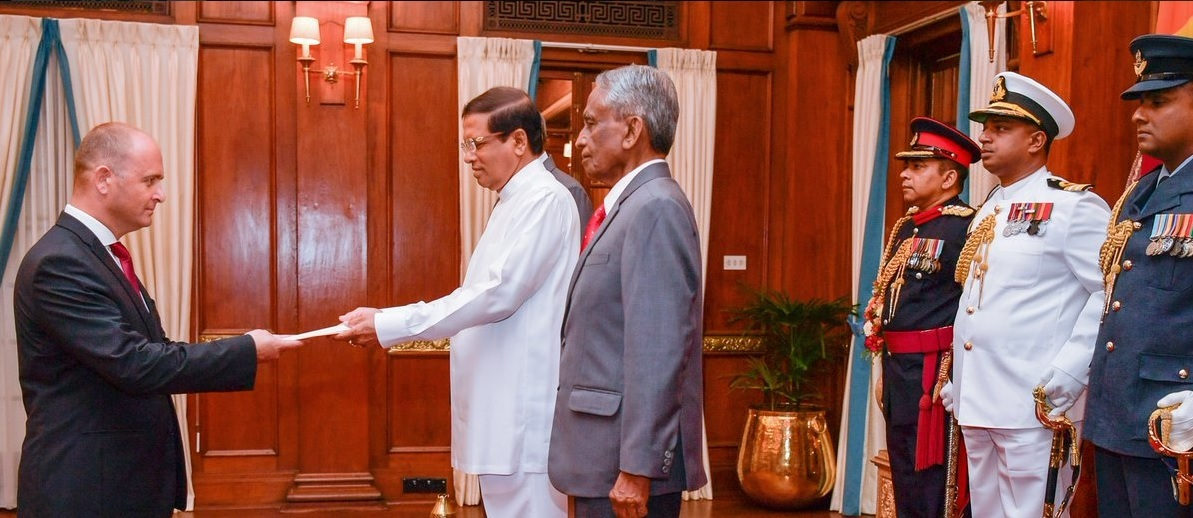
Current ambassador of Estonia to Sri Lanka, Riho Kruuv, presents his credentials to Sri Lankan President Maithripala Sirisena in September 2017

Estonia–Sri Lanka relations are the bilateral relations between Estonia and Sri Lanka. Estonia has an embassy in Colombo, and Sri Lanka a non resident embassy in Stockholm. Estonia's 2004 admission to the European Union benefitted the country's bilateral relations with Sri Lanka, since the EU is one of Sri Lanka's biggest donors and trade partners.

== History ==
Sri Lanka first recognized Estonia's independence from the collapsing Soviet Union on 10 October 1991, and diplomatic relations were established on 31 January 1996. Since Estonia's induction into the European Union it has had a positive effect on bilateral relations with Sri Lanka, since the EU is one of Sri Lanka's biggest donors and trade partners.

On April 30, 2009, an invitation was given by Ambassador Jayasooriya to the Speaker of the Estonian Parliament to visit Sri Lanka and strengthen the relationship between the two countries when the Sri Lankan Ambassador met Toomas Hendrik Ilves, the President of Estonia.

In 2009, Kaido Kotkas of Estonia argued for closer relations with Sri Lanka:

Sri Lankan people, in fact lots of them, don't know much about Estonia and the majority of the Estonians do not know anything about Sri Lanka, either. To know each other and to establish acquaintances, at least we have to start a process of communication, establish contacts, visit and become friends. It is nice to visit as friends. It is nice to invite each other as friends and ask them to come down to play some tennis or badminton or to have some lunch or dinner together. After establishing some form of a mutual understanding, after exploring some form of commonness between us and by then we will have some common topics to talk about.

Estonia's first consulate in Sri Lanka was declared opened on 24 February 2011.

== High level meetings ==
On 25 September 2003, the Estonian Foreign Minister Kristiina Ojuland and Sri Lankan Prime Minister Ranil Wickremesinghe met during the UN General Assembly in New York City.

== High level visits ==
To date, there has been no state visits by leaders of either country. There has been only one visit by a government minister to the other country. The Estonian Minister of Foreign Affairs, Urmas Paet, along with a key trade delegation, visited Sri Lanka in February 2013 with a goal of strengthening bilateral trade and other investment opportunities, in areas such as maritime, railways, infrastructure, defense and tourism. During their visit they met with Sri Lanka's Minister of Defence and Urban Development Gotabaya Rajapaksa, Sri Lanka's Minister for Economic Development Basil Rajapakse and Sri Lanka's Minister of Industry and Commerce Risad Badhiutheen

== Economic relations ==
Economic ties between Sri Lanka and Estonia are very low. Sri Lanka was placed 78th among Estonia's trade partners in 2007 resulting in a total trade turnover between Estonia and Sri Lanka of 28.5 million kroons. Sri Lanka ranked 89th among Estonia's export partners and 61st among import partners in 2007. The balance of trade between two countries has been favourable for Estonia except in 2000. Sri Lanka is the biggest Black Tea supplier and the second biggest Green Tea supplier to the Estonian market.

Revenue from Estonian imports from Sri Lanka totaled an estimated US$13.56 million in 2024, according to the United Nations COMTRADE database on international trade.

Estonia Imports from Sri Lanka	Value	Year
Total	$13.56M	2024
Articles of apparel, not knit or crocheted	$5.23M	2024
Articles of apparel, knit or crocheted	$3.22M	2024
Coffee, tea, mate and spices	$1.84M	2024
Miscellaneous edible preparations	$607.39K	2024
Miscellaneous chemical products	$523.81K	2024
Rubbers	$459.12K	2024
Electrical, electronic equipment	$431.30K	2024
Animal, vegetable fats and oils, cleavage products	$201.41K	2024
Footwear, gaiters and the like,	$154.00K	2024
Edible fruits, nuts, peel of citrus fruit, melons	$115.71K	2024
Toys, games, sports requisites	$115.22K	2024
Other made textile articles, sets, worn clothing	$109.96K	2024
Vehicles other than railway, tramway	$87.36K	2024
Wadding, felt, nonwovens, yarns, twine, cordage	$68.87K	2024
Oil seed, oleagic fruits, grain, seed, fruits	$65.59K	2024
Articles of leather, animal gut, harness, travel good	$49.84K	2024
Headgear and	$43.14K	2024
Manufacturers of plaiting material, basketwork	$35.89K	2024
Ceramic products	$32.41K	2024
Aluminum	$28.32K	2024
Cereal, flour, starch, milk preparations and products	$20.16K	2024
Vegetable, fruit, nut food preparations	$18.1K	2024
Cocoa and cocoa preparations	$14.02K	2024
Beverages, spirits and vinegar	$12.87K	2024

Trade between Estonia and Sri Lanka 2000–2007 (in thousand EUR):

Year	Imports to Estonia	Exports from Estonia
2000	1,554	828.6
2001	1,542	929.2
2002	2,053	1,899
2003	2,034	1,497
2004	453	1,255
2005	1,043	369.4
2006	1,363	292.5
2007	1,364	456.7
2008	1498.3	533
2009	1265	3210

== Agreements ==
- Intergovernmental Agreement for Co-operation in Culture, Education and Science (2005) which "foresees interlibrary loaning, creating contacts between universities and other educational and scientific establishments, exchanging of TV and radio programmes, and co-operation between sports and youth organisations."
- Agreement for Co-operation Between the Estonian Chamber of Commerce and Industry and the Ceylon Chamber of Commerce (2000)

== Tourism ==
The Estonian President Toomas Hendrik Ilves has acknowledged that Sri Lanka is a very attractive tourist destination and has suggested that Sri Lanka should concentrate on promoting Estonian tourists to Sri Lanka as Estonians are interested in visiting destinations with diversified tourist attractions.

In 2015, it was reported that around 2000 Estonian tourists visit Sri Lanka and year.

== Resident diplomatic missions ==
- Estonia is accredited to Sri Lanka from its embassy in New Delhi, India.
- Sri Lanka is accredited to Estonia from its embassy in Stockholm, Sweden.

== See also ==
- Foreign relations of Estonia
- Foreign relations of Sri Lanka
