= Denmark–Sri Lanka relations =

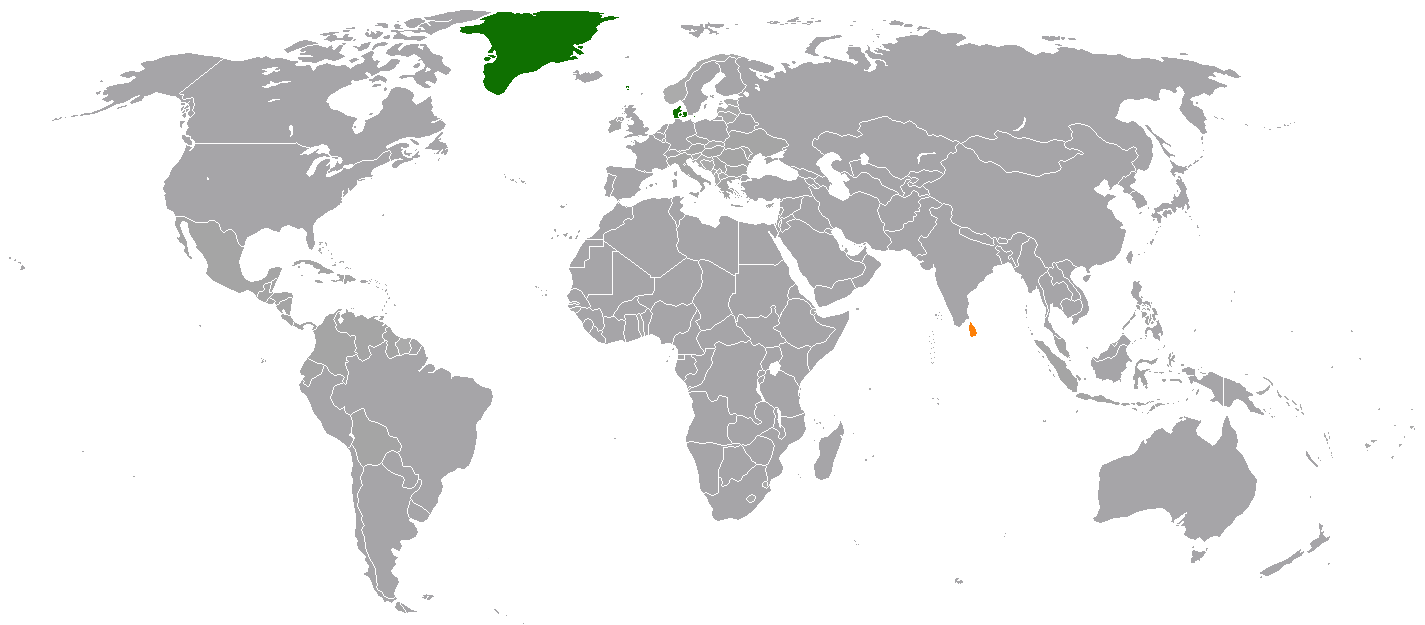

- Denmark: Sri Lanka

Denmark–Sri Lanka relations refers to the current and historical relations between Denmark and Sri Lanka. Denmark is represented in Sri Lanka through its embassy in New Delhi, India. Sri Lanka is represented in Denmark through its embassy Oslo, Norway. Bilateral relations are described as warm for a long time. About 13,000 immigrants from Sri Lanka live in Denmark. President of Sri Lanka Chandrika Bandaranaike Kumaratunga visited Denmark in March 1995.

== History ==
The beginning of the relations between the two countries goes back to the 17th century. In the year 1619, the Danish arrived in Trincomalee with a first ship called "Øresund" under the command of Roelant Cape. This small expedition was a vanguard of another Danish fleet, composed of 4 vessels and 300 soldiers, commanded by Ove Giedde, that reached the island of Ceylon in May 1620. They wanted to try their fortune in the Asian seas; the Danish expedition occupied Koneswaram temple. It was here that the Danes began the works for the fortification of the peninsula. The Danes were also the first Europeans to settle in Trincomalee.

Diplomatic relations between Denmark and Sri Lanka were established on 5 January 1953. In 1959, an agreement on air services was signed. On 16 February 1963, both countries signed an agreement on double taxation. Denmark provided a loan to Sri Lanka in 1968.

== Development assistance ==
In 2003, DANIDA assisted Sri Lanka with 156 million DKK for demining, human rights and conflict resolutions.

On 18 February 2009, during the Sri Lankan Civil War, Danish Minister for Development Cooperation Ulla Tørnæs assisted Sri Lanka with 34 million DKK for demining and for the civilians in northern Sri Lanka.

=== Sri Lanka Monitoring Mission ===
Sri Lanka Monitoring Mission was established on 22 February 2002 under the terms of a ceasefire agreement signed by the Government of Sri Lanka and the Liberation Tigers of Tamil Eelam, as a body that would monitor the ceasefire and enquire into reported violations of the ceasefire agreement. Its members were drawn primarily from Norway, Sweden, Finland, Denmark, and Iceland. Following the abrogating of the ceasefire agreement in January 2008, the SLMM announced on 3 January 2008 that it would finally terminate its remaining operational activities in Sri Lanka with effect from 16 January 2008.

== Trade ==
Trade between Denmark and Sri Lanka has been described as "impressive". Sri Lankan exports to Denmark are mainly rubber tyres, tobacco and clothing, while Danish exports to Sri Lanka includes fish, milk, hearing aids (Oticon A/S) and medicaments. In 2008, Danish exports to Sri Lanka amounted 145 million DKK and Sri Lankan exports to Denmark amounted 157.9 million DKK.

== See also ==
- Foreign relations of Denmark
- Foreign relations of Sri Lanka
