= Russia–Sri Lanka relations =

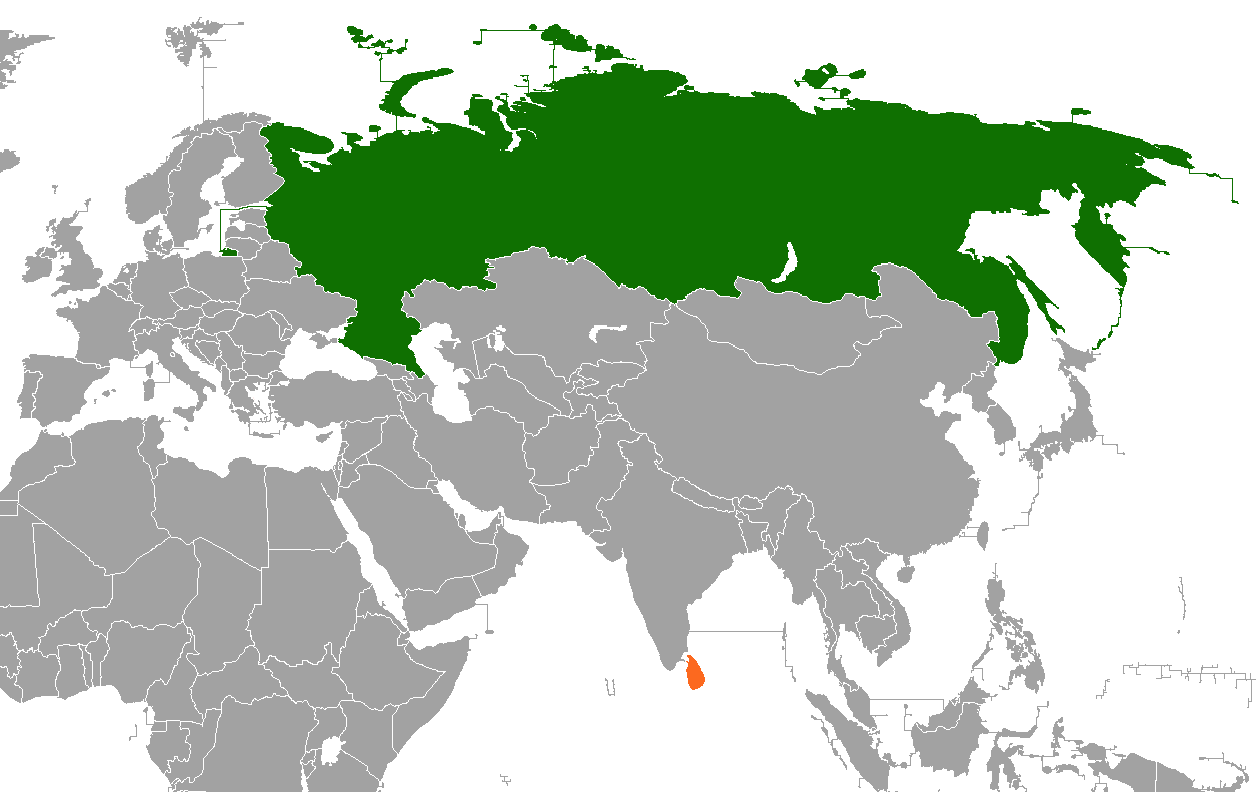

- Russia: Sri Lanka

Russia–Sri Lanka relations (Russian: Российско-ланкийские отношения, Sinhala: රුසියා-ශ්‍රී ලංකා සබඳතා, Tamil: ரஷ்யா-இலங்கை உறவுகள்) are the bilateral relations between the Russian Federation and the Democratic Socialist Republic of Sri Lanka.

== Background ==
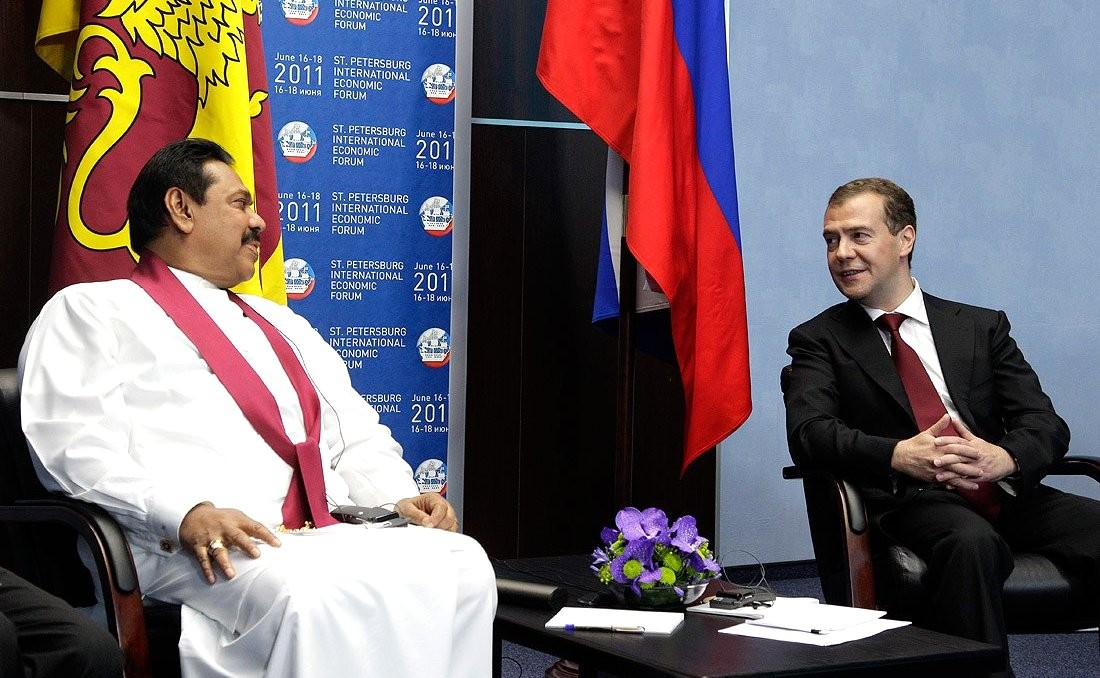
Sri Lankan President Mahinda Rajapaksa with Russian President Dmitry Medvedev, at St. Petersburg Economic Forum, in June 2011.

=== Soviet-era relations ===
The relationship were established in 19th February in 1957. During the Soviet era, Russo-Sri Lankan relations were shaped by Cold War dynamics, economic cooperation, and ideological considerations. The Soviet Union established diplomatic relations with Sri Lanka (then Ceylon) in 1957, marking the beginning of closer ties. While Sri Lanka maintained a policy of non-alignment, it engaged with both the West and the Eastern Bloc, including the USSR.

The Soviets supported Sri Lanka in various sectors, including infrastructure, education, and military cooperation. Soviet assistance contributed to projects such as the Oruwala Steel Mill and technical training programs. Cultural and academic exchanges also strengthened ties between the two nations. Additionally, the USSR provided military aid, though Sri Lanka’s strategic position in the Indian Ocean meant that its foreign policy remained cautious to avoid alienating other partners, including India and Western nations.

Economically, trade relations between the two countries grew, with the Soviet Union importing Sri Lankan tea and rubber while exporting machinery and industrial goods. However, the USSR’s influence was limited compared to that of Western allies like the UK and the US.

== Russian Federation relations ==
=== Political ties ===
In the UN, Russia has supported Sri Lanka in nearly every resolution brought forward against them. The most notable one was during the final stages of Sri Lanka's civil war in 2009 when European nations along with Canada and Mexico brought a resolution calling for a ceasefire. However, China and Russia vetoed that resolution. Another resolution accusing the government of war crimes that was tabled by Western nations was once again vetoed by Russia and China.

Following the Russian invasion of Ukraine, Sri Lanka stated that the concerns of Russia were justifiable, while also calling for de-escalation.

In 2022, Sri Lanka abstained from both Resolution ES-11/1 and Resolution ES-11/4 UN votes on Russia.

=== Military ties ===
Russia has assisted Sri Lanka to obtain weaponry from several countries throughout the past 30 years. Examples of this include Mil Mi-17 helicopters used by Sri Lanka Air Force and T-54/55 battle tanks, BTR-80 APC used by Sri Lanka Army.

In 2017, Sri Lanka ordered Gepard-class frigate worth US$158.5 million for the Sri Lanka Navy.

In 2020, Sri Lanka requested 4 Mi-17 helicopters and additional military items valued between US$60 to US$135 million.

=== Economic ties ===
Sri Lanka and Russia have recently ramped up cooperation on expanding the tea trade between the two nations. Currently, approximately 17 % of Sri Lanka's tea exports go to Russia. Sri Lankan teas account for 30% of Russia's tea market. In 2016, 58,176 Russian tourists travelled to Sri Lanka.

In December 2017, Russia imposed a temporary restriction on the imports of agricultural products from Sri Lanka including Ceylon tea after an insect called the Khapra beetle was found in a consignment of tea. Later, however, it was revealed that the beetle is neither native to, nor lives in, Sri Lanka. Russia accounts for nearly 19% of Sri Lanka's $1.27 billion tea exports. After discussions with an official delegation from the Sri Lanka Tea Board, Russia agreed to lift the restrictions from December 30. Sri Lanka also lifted a ban on asbestos, mainly imported from Russia.

== See also ==
- Foreign relations of Russia
- Foreign relations of Sri Lanka
- Embassy of Sri Lanka in Moscow
- List of ambassadors of Russia to Sri Lanka
- List of ambassadors of Sri Lanka to Russia
