= Palestine–Sri Lanka relations =

- Palestine: Sri Lanka

Palestine–Sri Lanka relations refer to the bilateral relations between the State of Palestine and Sri Lanka. Historically, relations between the two countries have been very friendly. Relations between Palestine and Sri Lanka started in 1975, when the Palestine Liberation Organization (PLO) opened up an embassy in Colombo. After the Palestinian Declaration of Independence on 15 November 1988, Sri Lanka was among the first few countries in the world to recognize the State of Palestine.

Sri Lanka currently supports a two-state solution to the ongoing Israeli–Palestinian conflict, and recognizes both the State of Palestine and Israel. Sri Lanka has voted in support of Palestine in almost every resolution brought to the UN.

== History ==
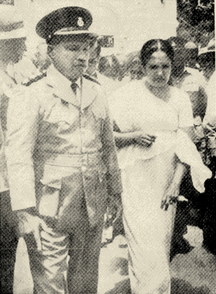
Sri Lankan Prime Minister Sirimavo Bandaranaike was a strong ally of Palestine.

The relationship between Sri Lanka and Palestine, particularly the Palestine Liberation Organization (PLO), can be traced back to 1971, when the left-wing Sri Lanka Freedom Party led by Sirimavo Bandaranaike promised to close down the Israel embassy in Sri Lanka in support of the Palestinian cause during their election campaigns. After Sirimavo Bandaranaike came to power, the Israel embassy was closed down despite many threats by lobbies in the United Kingdom to boycott Sri Lankan tea. Shortly after closing down the Israel embassy, Sirimavo Bandaranaike invited the PLO to establish diplomatic ties with Sri Lanka. In 1975, the PLO established a Palestinian embassy in Sri Lanka, a year after the Sri Lanka-Palestine Solidarity Committee was created.

After the United National Party led by J. R. Jayewardene came to power, Sri Lanka re-established ties with Israel. Diplomatic ties with Israel were suspended again under President Ranasinghe Premadasa in support of the Palestinian cause, but were re-established in 2000.

In 1997, Palestinian leader Yasser Arafat offered to mediate a settlement for the Sri Lankan Civil War, after meeting with Sri Lankan President Chandrika Kumaratunga.

== Current relations ==
In January 2024, President Ranil Wickremesinghe affirmed Sri Lanka's support for a two-state solution to the ongoing Israeli–Palestinian conflict. Sri Lanka has donated money to Palestine and provided humanitarian aid on several occasions. In 2014, Sri Lanka donated a million US dollars to provide humanitarian aid to Palestine.

Sri Lanka strongly opposed the decision by US President Donald Trump to recognise Jerusalem as the capital of Israel. The Sri Lanka Palestine Parliamentary Friendship Association (SLPPFA) held a massive rally led by Sri Lankan Minister of Health Rajitha Senaratne in support of Palestine during the issue. In 2018, during a speech to the United Nations, Sri Lankan president and leader of the SLFP Maithripala Sirisena expressed support for the liberation of the Palestinian people and urged the UN and all member states to approach the Palestinian issue in a more humane manner, taking into consideration the inhumane conditions Palestinians face. Sirisena gave assurance that Sri Lanka is committed to stand by the struggle for independence of the Palestinian people, and gave a plot of land in Colombo for Palestine to open a new embassy.

During the Gaza war, the Foreign Ministry of Sri Lanka expressed concern about the loss of life in both Israel and Gaza. UNP President Ranil Wickremesinghe denounced Hamas's aggression, stating that criticism of Israel was not a valid justification for Hamas's attacks. Sri Lanka voted against condemning Hamas at the United Nations.

== See also ==
- Israel–Sri Lanka relations
