= Mexico–Sri Lanka relations =

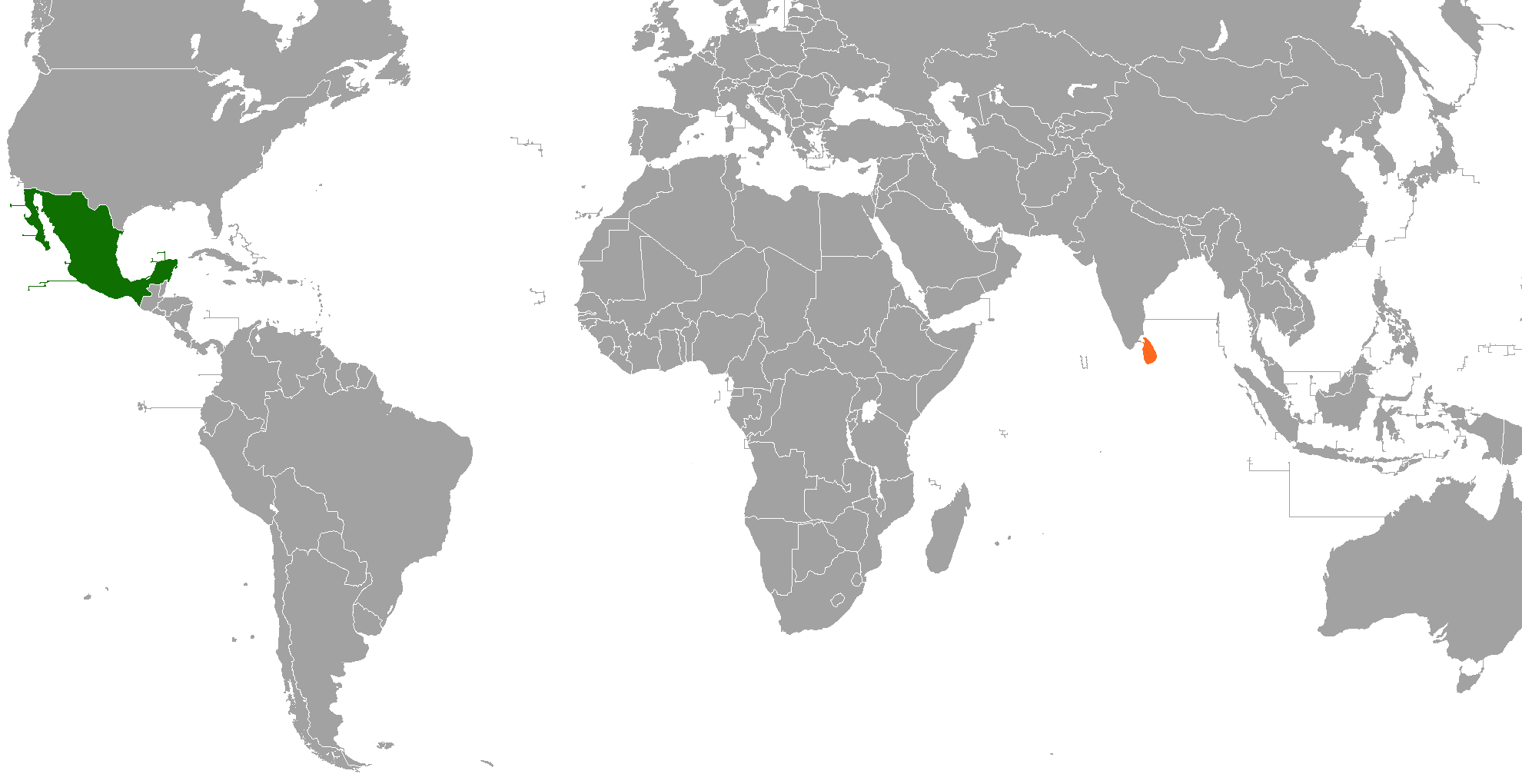

- Mexico: Sri Lanka

The nations of Mexico and Sri Lanka established diplomatic relations in 1960. Both nations are members of the United Nations.

== History ==
Mexico and Sri Lanka established diplomatic relations on 19 April 1960. In June 1975, Sri Lankan Prime Minister Sirimavo Bandaranaike paid a visit to Mexico City to attend the first World Conference on Women. A month later, in July 1975, Mexican President Luis Echeverría paid a state visit to Sri Lanka. During the visit, President Echeverría met with Sri Lankan Prime Minister Sirimavo Bandaranaike and discussed bilateral issues and international affairs of common interest. Both leaders joined the opportunity to continue the dialogue initiated during the official visit that the Prime Minister made to Mexico in June 1975. They expressed satisfaction with the growing links between Mexico and Sri Lanka and they agreed to intensify them even more, especially in the fields of commerce, culture, science and technology.

In August 1976, Mexican Foreign Minister Alfonso García Robles paid a visit to Sri Lanka to attend the Non-Aligned Movement conference in Colombo. In 1995, Mexico opened an honorary consulate in Colombo.

In September 2010, Deputy Minister of External Affairs, Gitanjana Gunawardena, represented Sri Lanka at Mexico's bicentennial celebration in Mexico City. In November of that same year, Sri Lankan Deputy Minister Gunawardena returned again to Mexico to attend the fourth Global Forum on Migration and Development being held in Puerto Vallarta. While in Puerto Vallarta, Deputy Minister Gunawardena met with Mexican Foreign Undersecretary Lourdes Aranda Bezaury and both officials agreed on the need to promote greater bilateral contacts through reciprocal visits and meetings in multilateral forums, with the purpose of broadening understanding between the two countries and promoting issues of common interest. In December 2010, Sri Lankan Minister for the Environment, Ranepura Samaratunga, paid a visit to Mexico to attend the 2010 United Nations Climate Change Conference.

In 2012, Sri Lanka opened an honorary consulate in Mexico City. In 2023, both nations celebrated 63 years of diplomatic relations.

== High-level visits ==
High-level visits from Mexico to Sri Lanka

- President Luis Echeverría (1975)
- Foreign Minister Alfonso García Robles (1976)

High-level visits from Sri Lanka to Mexico

- Prime Minister Sirimavo Bandaranaike (1975)
- Deputy Minister of External Affairs Gitanjana Gunawardena (September & November 2010)
- Minister for Environment Ranepura Samaratunga (2010)

== Bilateral agreements and scholarships ==
Both nations have signed an Agreement for the Establishment of a Mechanism of Consultations on Matters of Common Interest (2023). The Mexican government offers each year scholarships for nationals of Sri Lanka to study postgraduate studies at Mexican higher education institutions.

== Trade ==
In 2023, trade between Mexico and Sri Lanka totaled US$322.4 million. Mexico's main exports to Sri Lanka include: chemical based products, alcohol, vegetable products, telephones and mobile phones, and weighing apparatuses and instruments. Sri Lanka's main exports to Mexico include: clothing, cinnamon, tea, machinery parts, tires, kitchenware, coconut and coconut oil.

== Diplomatic missions ==
- Mexico is accredited to Sri Lanka from its embassy in New Delhi, India and maintains an honorary consulate in Colombo.
- Sri Lanka is accredited to Mexico from its embassy in Washington, D.C., United States and maintains an honorary consulate in Mexico City.
