= Israel–Sri Lanka relations =

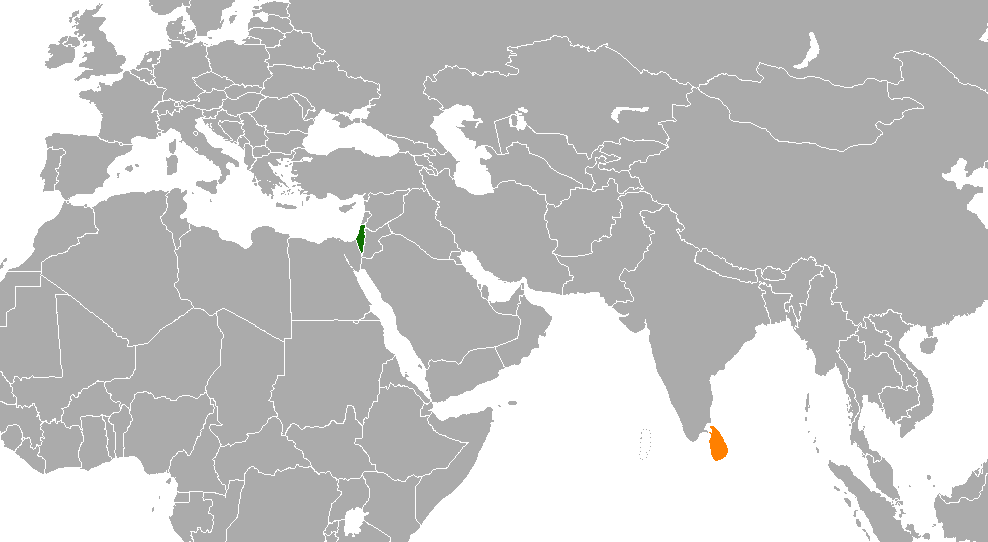

- Israel: Sri Lanka

Israel–Sri Lanka relations refers to the bilateral relations between Israel and Sri Lanka.

Sri Lanka has an embassy in Tel Aviv. The current Sri Lankan ambassador to Israel is M. H. M. N Bandara. Israel formerly held an embassy in Sri Lanka, but today is represented in Sri Lanka by the Embassy of Israel in New Delhi, India.

== History ==
Since its independence in 1948, Ceylon maintained limited ties with Israel compared to most of its neighbors, which refused to collaborate with or recognize Israel. Under UNP Prime Minister D. S. Senanayake, Ceylon began buying weapons from Israel, including the HMCyS Gajabahu.

SLFP Prime Ministers S. W. R. D. Bandaranaike and Sirimavo Bandaranaike were hostile to Israel in comparison, and preferred establishing closer relations with the Palestine Liberation Organization. In 1971, as part of her election campaign, Sirimavo Bandaranaike promised to close down the Israel embassy in Sri Lanka in support of the Palestinian cause. After Bandaranaike came to power, the Israel embassy was closed down despite several threats by lobbies in the United Kingdom to boycott Sri Lankan tea.

By the late 1970s, however, Lalith Athulathmudali and Ravi Jayewardene believed that Sri Lanka should turn to Israel to combat the Sri Lankan Tamil insurgents and the terrorism of the Liberation Tigers of Tamil Eelam (LTTE). Sri Lankan President J.R. Jayewardene established diplomatic ties with Israel. Mossad advised the Sri Lankan government to accelerate the Mahaweli development project to solve the energy crisis while providing the best strategy to settle Sinhalese farmers in the island’s dry zones as well as finding funding from international agencies for projects. In return, many contracts for designing and developing Mahaweli settlements went to Solel Boneh.

Diplomatic ties were suspended in 1992 under president Ranasinghe Premadasa due to pressure from pro-Palestinian Muslim groups in Sri Lanka. Relations were restored in 2000.

Israel was a key source of weapons and training for the Sri Lanka Armed Forces during the Sri Lankan Civil War against the LTTE. Israel sold weapons to the country, including the IAI Kfir fighter jet, the Super Dvora Mk III-class patrol boat, Saar 4 class missile boats and the Gabriel missile. Israel also tested weapons off the coast of Sri Lanka such as the cruise missile Popeye.

In February 2020, Israel offered Sri Lanka technology in agriculture, education, transportation and IT sectors, which was openly welcomed by Sri Lankan President Gotabaya Rajapaksa. In September 2021, the Sri Lankan government signed an agreement with Israel to upgrade Israeli-made Kfir fighter jets of the Sri Lanka Air Force.

=== Gaza conflict ===
During the Gaza war, the Foreign Ministry expressed concern about the loss of life in both Israel and Gaza. UNP President Ranil Wickremesinghe denounced Hamas's aggression, stating that criticism of Israel is not a valid justification for Hamas's attack. Sri Lanka and Israel also signed an agreement to allow Israel to immediately hire 10,000 farm workers from Sri Lanka to replace 20,000 Palestinian agricultural workers who were banned from Israel and 8,000 foreign workers that fled Israel due to the war. In January 2024 the government of Sri Lanka also began talks with Israel to send an additional 20,000 Sri Lankans for jobs in the Israeli construction sector.

Sri Lanka, a popular destination for Israeli tourists, especially reservists, saw a notable increase in Israeli visitors in 2024, with an estimated 20,000 arriving, resulting in calls by pro-Palestinian locals to restrict Israeli arrivals.

== Foreign workers ==
In 2017, the governments of Israel, Sri Lanka, and Nepal signed a bilateral agreement to bring foreign nursing aides to Israel. The agreement resulted from the difficulties in supervising the quality of nursing aides arriving in Israel and in preventing employment agencies from taking illegal payment from potential workers in their country of origin to enable them to enter Israel. In order to identify the best ways to improve the system, a program brought 100 nursing aides, who participated in a special training program to prepare them for work in Israel. An evaluation of the pilot found that participants and employers both reported high satisfaction with the training and the process, with no indications from that the nursing aides had paid any more money than the amount specified in the initial agreement.

== See also ==
- Foreign relations of Israel
- Palestine–Sri Lanka relations
