= List of diplomatic missions in Sri Lanka =

This is a list of diplomatic missions in Sri Lanka.

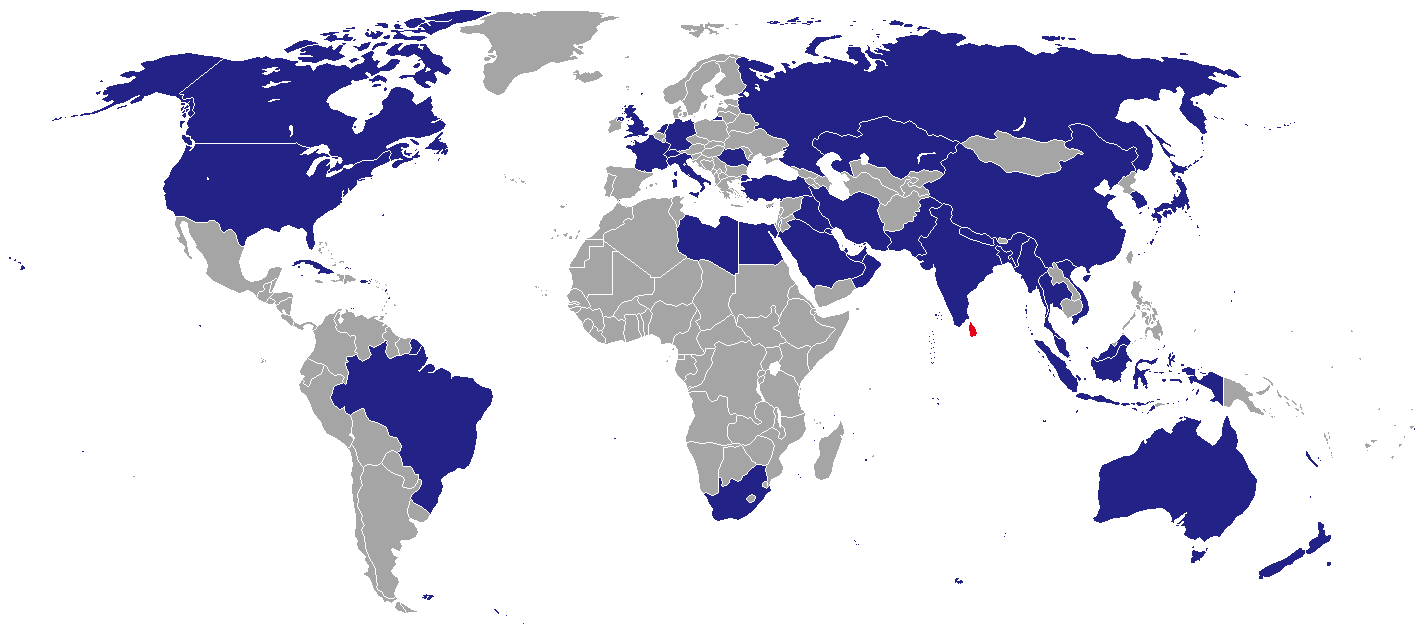
Map of diplomatic missions in Sri Lanka

== Diplomatic missions in Colombo ==
=== Embassies / High Commission ===
1. Australia
2. Bangladesh
3. Brazil
4. Canada
5. China
6. Cuba
7. Egypt
8. France
9. Germany
10. Holy See
11. India
12. Indonesia
13. Iran
14. Iraq
15. Italy
16. Japan
17. Kazakhstan
18. Kuwait
19. Libya
20. Malaysia
21. Maldives
22. Myanmar
23. Nepal
24. Netherlands
25. New Zealand
26. Oman
27. Pakistan
28. Palestine
29. Qatar
30. Romania
31. Russia
32. Saudi Arabia
33. South Africa
34. South Korea
35. Switzerland
36. Thailand
37. Turkey
38. United Arab Emirates
39. United Kingdom
40. United States
41. Vietnam

=== Other missions or delegations ===
- European Union (Delegation)

== Consular missions ==
=== Hambantota ===
- India (Consulate-General)

=== Jaffna ===
- India (Consulate-General)

=== Kandy ===
- India (Assistant High Commission)

== Non-resident embassies and high commissions accredited to Sri Lanka ==
=== Resident in New Delhi, India ===
1. Afghanistan
2. Algeria
3. Angola
4. Argentina
5. Armenia
6. Austria
7. Azerbaijan
8. Bahrain
9. Belarus
10. Belgium
11. Botswana
12. Bosnia and Herzegovina
13. Brunei
14. Bulgaria
15. Burkina Faso
16. Cambodia
17. Chile
18. Colombia
19. Congo-Brazzaville
20. Congo-Kinshasa
21. Croatia
22. Cyprus
23. Czechia
24. Denmark
25. Djibouti
26. Dominican Republic
27. Ecuador
28. El Salvador
29. Eritrea
30. Estonia
31. Eritrea
32. Ethiopia
33. Fiji
34. Finland
35. Gambia
36. Georgia
37. Ghana
38. Greece
39. Guatemala
40. Guinea
41. Guyana
42. Hungary
43. Iceland
44. Ireland
45. Israel
46. Ivory Coast
47. Jamaica
48. Jordan
49. Kenya
50. Kyrgyzstan
51. Laos
52. Kyrgyzstan
53. Latvia
54. Lebanon
55. Lesotho
56. Lithuania
57. Luxembourg
58. Madagascar
59. Malawi
60. Mali
61. Malta
62. Mauritius
63. Mexico
64. Mongolia
65. Morocco
66. Mozambique
67. Namibia
68. Nigeria
69. North Korea
70. North Macedonia
71. Norway
72. Papua New Guinea
73. Paraguay
74. Peru
75. Poland
76. Portugal
77. Rwanda
78. Senegal
79. Serbia
80. Seychelles
81. Slovakia
82. Slovenia
83. Somalia
84. South Sudan
85. Spain
86. Sudan
87. Suriname
88. Sweden
89. Syria
90. Tajikistan
91. Tanzania
92. Trinidad and Tobago
93. Tunisia
94. Turkmenistan
95. Uganda
96. Ukraine
97. Uruguay
98. Venezuela
99. Yemen
100. Zambia
101. Zimbabwe

=== Resident elsewhere ===
1. Albania (Rome)
2. Benin (Tokyo)
3. Bhutan (Dhaka)
4. Eswatini (Kuala Lumpur)
5. Mauritania (Abu Dhabi)
6. Monaco (Paris)
7. Philippines (Dhaka)
8. Panama (Hanoi)
9. San Marino (Rome)
10. Singapore (Singapore)
11. Sierra Leone (Beijing)
12. Uzbekistan (Islamabad)

== Closed missions ==
Host city	Sending country	Mission	Year closed	Ref.
Colombo	Afghanistan	Embassy	2022	
Colombo	Nigeria	High Commission	2017	
Colombo	Norway	Embassy	2023	
Colombo	Philippines	Embassy	1993	
Colombo	Poland	Embassy	1993	
Colombo	Seychelles	High Commission	2021	
Colombo	Sweden	Embassy	2010	

== See also ==
- Foreign relations of Sri Lanka
