= High Commission of Sri Lanka, Canberra =

High Commission of Sri Lanka in Canberra
- Location: Canberra, Australia
- Address: 61 Hampton Circuit, Yarralumla, Canberra ACT 2600
- Coordinates: 35°18′40.70″S 149°06′27.60″E
- High Commissioner: Mrs. Chitranganee Wagiswara

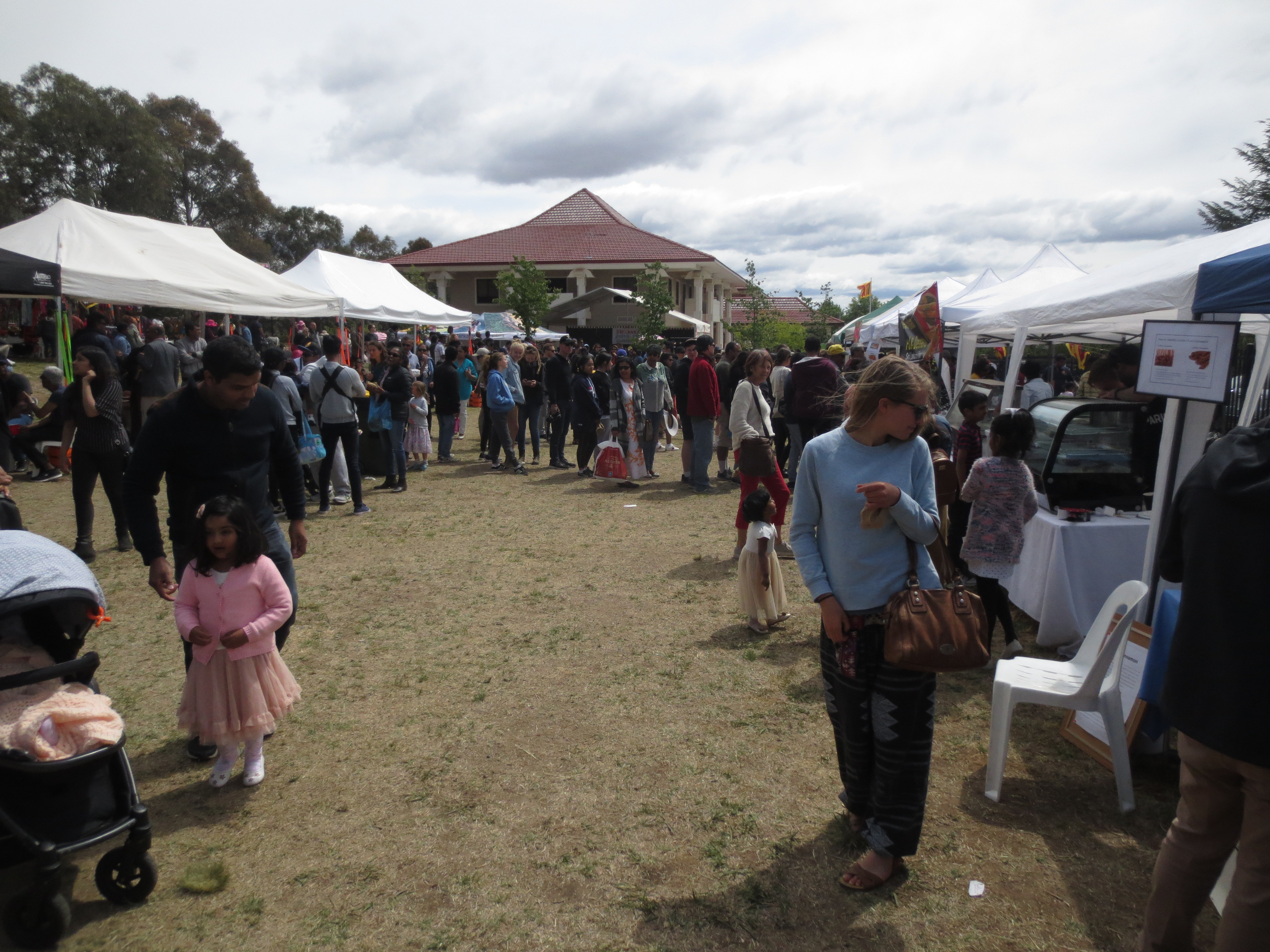
Sri Lankan Embassy open day, Canberra, 2019

The High Commission of Sri Lanka in Canberra is the diplomatic mission of Sri Lanka to Australia. The high commission is also accredited to Fiji, New Zealand, Papua New Guinea and Vanuatu. The current high commissioner is Mrs Yasoja Gunasekara (from April 2025) The predecessors were Mrs. Chitranganee Wagiswara, Mr. Somasundaram Skandakumar and Admiral Thisara Samarasinghe, the former Commander of the Sri Lanka Navy.
