= List of international presidential trips made by Chandrika Kumaratunga =

Chandrika Kumaratunga served as the 5th President of Sri Lanka 12 November 1994 to 19 November 2005. This article documents all international presidential trips made by Kumaratunga during her term in office.

== Summary of international trips ==
According to this list, Kumaratunga made 45 foreign trips to 25 countries during her term in office.

No. of visits	Country
8	India, United Kingdom
6	United States
4	France
2	Bangladesh, China, Malaysia, Nepal, Pakistan
1	Belgium, Denmark, Egypt, Germany, Iran, Italy, Jamaica, Japan, Maldives, Netherlands, Portugal, Singapore, South Africa, South Korea, Switzerland, Thailand

== 1994 ==
President Kumaratunga made no international trips in 1994.

== 1995 ==
President Kumaratunga made 4 trips to 4 countries in the year 1995.

No.	Country	Areas visited	Date(s)	Purpose(s)	Notes	Ref.
1	India	New Delhi	March 1995	State visit	See also: India–Sri Lanka relations	
2	Denmark	Copenhagen	6–12 March 1995	World Summit for Social Development	See also: Denmark–Sri Lanka relations	
2	United Kingdom	London	March 1995	State visit	See also: Sri Lanka–United Kingdom relations	
3	India	New Delhi	2–4 May 1995	8th SAARC Summit	See also: India–Sri Lanka relations	
4	United States	New York	19 September–3 October 1995	United Nations General Assembly	See also: Sri Lanka–United States relations	

== 1996 ==
President Kumaratunga made 5 trips to 5 countries in the year 1996.

No.	Country	Areas visited	Date(s)	Purpose(s)	Notes	Ref.
5	China	Beijing	21–27 April 1996	State visit	See also: China–Sri Lanka relations Invited by Chinese President Jiang Zemin. Signed two agreements to enhance economic cooperation.	
6	Japan	Tokyo	May 1996	State visit	See also: Japan–Sri Lanka relations	
7	Egypt	Cairo	13–26 July 1996	State visit		
8	France	Paris	1996	State visit		
9	South Korea	Seoul	11–13 August 1996	State visit	See also: South Korea–Sri Lanka relations	

== 1997 ==
President Kumaratunga made 3 trips to 3 countries in the year 1997.

No.	Country	Areas visited	Date(s)	Purpose(s)	Notes	Ref.
10	Maldives	Malé	12–14 May 1997	9th SAARC summit	See also: Maldives–Sri Lanka relations	
11	Malaysia	Kuala Lumpur	15–25 September 1997	State visit	See also: Malaysia–Sri Lanka relations First official visit in 30 years. Met with Prime minister Mahathir Mohamad.	
12	United Kingdom	London; Edinburgh	22–27 October 1997	1997 Commonwealth Heads of Government Meeting and Commonwealth Business Forum	See also: Sri Lanka–United Kingdom relations Met with Queen Elizabeth II and Prince Philip, Duke of Edinburgh.	

== 1998 ==
President Kumaratunga made 4 trips to 4 countries in the year 1998.

No.	Country	Areas visited	Date(s)	Purpose(s)	Notes	Ref.
13	Switzerland	Geneva	April 1998	Health Developing Asia Seminar	See also: Sri Lanka–Switzerland relations	
14	South Africa	Durban	2–3 September 1998	12th Summit of the Non-Aligned Movement	See also: South Africa–Sri Lanka relations Met with President Nelson Mandela.	
15	United States	New York	9–13 September 1998	United Nations General Assembly	See also: Sri Lanka–United States relations	
16	India	New Delhi	27–30 December 1998	State visit	See also: India–Sri Lanka relations Met with President K. R. Narayanan and Prime Minister Atal Bihari Vajpayee.	

== 1999 ==
President Kumaratunga made 3 trips to 4 countries in the year 1999.

No.	Country	Areas visited	Date(s)	Purpose(s)	Notes	Ref.
17	Jamaica	Montego Bay	10–12 February 1999	9th G-15 summit		
18	Portugal	Lisbon	– July 1999	Private visit	See also: Portugal–Sri Lanka relations	
18	United Kingdom	London	–7 July 1999	Private visit		
19	Nepal	Kathmandu	6–9 July 1999	State visit	See also: Nepal–Sri Lanka relations	

== 2000 ==
President Kumaratunga made 3 trips to 3 countries in the year 2000.

No.	Country	Areas visited	Date(s)	Purpose(s)	Notes	Ref.
20	United Kingdom	London	– December 2000	Private visit	See also: Sri Lanka–United Kingdom relations Travelled to receive medical treatment for her right eye, which had been injured following an assassination attempt.	
21	United States	New York	– April 2000	United Nations General Assembly	See also: Sri Lanka–United States relations Travelled to receive medical treatment for her eye.	
22	United Kingdom	London	– December 2000	Private visit	See also: Sri Lanka–United Kingdom relations Travelled to receive medical treatment for her eye.	
22	France	Paris	– December 2000	State visit	Met with President Jacques Chirac.	

== 2001 ==
President Kumaratunga made 3 trips to 6 countries in the year 2001.

No.	Country	Areas visited	Date(s)	Purpose(s)	Notes	Ref.
23	India	New Delhi	22–25 February 2001	State visit	See also: India–Sri Lanka relations Met with the President, Prime Minister and Minister of External Affairs.	
24	Germany	Berlin; Munich	12–16 March 2001	State visit	See also: Germany–Sri Lanka relations State visit to Germany on the invatiation of President Johannes Rau aimed at strengthening bilateral ties. Accompanied by Foreign Minister Lakshman Kadirgamar. Had high-level meetings with Chancellor Gerhard Schroeder and visited Bavaria.	
24	Netherlands		16–19 March 2001	State visit		
24	Belgium	Brussels	March 2001	State visit		
24	United Kingdom	London	March 2001	State visit	See also: Sri Lanka–United Kingdom relations	
24	France	Paris	28–30 March 2001	State visit	Met with French President Jacques Chirac and Prime Minister Lionel Jospin.	
25	United Kingdom	London	November 2001	State visit	See also: Sri Lanka–United Kingdom relations Addressed the Oxford Union.	

== 2002 ==
President Kumaratunga made 4 trips to 4 countries in the year 2002.

No.	Country	Areas visited	Date(s)	Purpose(s)	Notes	Ref.
26	Nepal	Kathmandu	4–6 January 2002	11th SAARC Summit	See also: Nepal–Sri Lanka relations	
27	India	New Delhi	22–26 April 2002	State visit	See also: India–Sri Lanka relations	
28	United States	New York	8–10 May 2002	27th Special Session of the General Assembly: Children	See also: Sri Lanka–United States relations	
29	Italy	Rome	June 2002	World Food Summit	See also: Italy–Sri Lanka relations	

== 2003 ==
President Kumaratunga made 4 trips to 4 countries in the year 2003.

No.	Country	Areas visited	Date(s)	Purpose(s)	Notes	Ref.
30	Malaysia	Kuala Lumpur	20–25 February 2003	13th Summit of the Non-Aligned Movement	See also: Malaysia–Sri Lanka relations	
31	India	New Delhi	7–10 April 2003	State visit	See also: India–Sri Lanka relations To deliver the first Madhao Rao Scindia Memorial Lecture. Me with the President, Prime Minister, Deputy Prime Minister, External Affairs Minister, Minister of Finance and Company Affairs, Leader of the Opposition, and the Chief Minister of Tamil Nadu.	
32	Bangladesh	Dhaka	19–20 April 2003	State visit	See also: Bangladesh–Sri Lanka relations Met with President Iajuddin Ahmed and Prime minister Khaleda Zia.	
33	Singapore	Singapore	12–14 October 2003	State visit	Met with President S. R. Nathan and Prime Minister Goh Chok Tong and Senior Minister Lee Kuan Yew. Addressed a plenary session at the East Asia Economic Summit 2003.	

== 2004 ==
President Kumaratunga made 5 trips to 5 countries in the year 2004.

No.	Country	Areas visited	Date(s)	Purpose(s)	Notes	Ref.
34	Pakistan	Islamabad	4–6 January 2004	12th SAARC Summit	See also: Pakistan–Sri Lanka relations	
35	Thailand	Bangkok	30–31 July 2004	1st BIMSTEC Summit		
36	United States	New York	15–21 September 2004	United Nations General Assembly	See also: Sri Lanka–United States relations	
37	Iran	Tehran	3–7 November 2004	State visit	See also: India–Sri Lanka relations First state visit by a Sri Lankan Head of State to Iran. Met with Supreme Leader Ayatollah Ali Khamenei and President Mohammad Khatami.	
38	India	New Delhi; Bihar	24–28 November 2004	State visit	See also: India–Sri Lanka relations	

== 2005 ==
President Kumaratunga made 7 trips to 7 countries in the year 2005.

No.	Country	Areas visited	Date(s)	Purpose(s)	Notes	Ref.
39	Pakistan	Islamabad	7–10 February 2005	12th SAARC Summit	See also: Pakistan–Sri Lanka relations Met with Prime Minister Shaukat Aziz to sign the Free Trade Agreement between the two countries.	
40	United Kingdom	London	9–? April 2005	Private visit	See also: Sri Lanka–United Kingdom relations Went to spend the New Year holidays with her children, who reside in London.	
41	India	New Delhi	2–4 June 2005	State visit	See also: India–Sri Lanka relations	
42	China	Beijing	30 August–2 September 2005	State visit	See also: China–Sri Lanka relations Visited China on the invitation of Chinese President Hu Jintao. Signed eight agreements on cooperation in cultural, economic, financial and tourism sectors.	
43	United States	New York	14–17 September 2005	United Nations General Assembly	See also: Sri Lanka–United States relations	
44	France	Paris	3–7 October 2005	33rd Session of the General Conference of UNESCO	Met with President Jacques Chirac.	
45	Bangladesh	Dhaka	12–13 November 2005	13th SAARC Summit	See also: Bangladesh–Sri Lanka relations	
