= List of international presidential trips made by J. R. Jayewardene =

J. R. Jayewardene served as the 2nd President of Sri Lanka from 4 February 1978 to 2 January 1989. This article documents all international presidential trips made by Jayawardene during his term in office.

== Summary of international trips ==
During his term in office, Jayewardene made 20 foreign trips to 17 countries.

No. of visits	Country
8	India
2	Cuba, Japan, Nepal, Pakistan, United States
1	Australia, Bahamas, Bahrain, Bangladesh, China, Egypt, Italy, Saudi Arabia, Singapore, South Korea, United Kingdom

== 1978 ==
No.	Country	Areas visited	Date(s)	Purpose(s)	Notes	Ref.
1	Australia	Sydney	13–16 February 1978	Regional Meeting of Commonwealth Heads of Government Meeting	See also: Australia–Sri Lanka relations Leader of the Sri Lanka Delegation to the Regional Meeting of the Commonwealth Heads of Government.	
2	India	New Delhi	27 October–November 1978	State visit	See also: India–Sri Lanka relations Held bilateral meetings with his Indian counterpart.	
2	Nepal	Kathmandu	October–November 1978	State visit	See also: Nepal–Sri Lanka relations	

== 1979 ==
No.	Country	Areas visited	Date(s)	Purpose(s)	Notes	Ref.
3	Cuba	Havana	August–9 September 1979	6th Summit of the Non-Aligned Movement	See also: Cuba–Sri Lanka relations	
3	United States	Los Angeles	9–11 September 1979	Unofficial visit	See also: Sri Lanka–United States relations Stopover en route between Summit of the Non-Aligned Movement and Japan visit.	
3	Japan	Tokyo	11–15 September 1979	State visit	See also: Japan–Sri Lanka relations	
3	Singapore	Singapore	15–19 September 1979	State visit	Met with President Benjamin Sheares and Prime Minister Lee Kuan Yew for a state dinner and meetings strengthening bilateral relations.	

== 1980 ==
No.	Country	Areas visited	Date(s)	Purpose(s)	Notes	Ref.
4	India	New Delhi	4–8 September 1980	Regional Meeting of Commonwealth Heads of Government Meeting	See also: India–Sri Lanka relations Leader of the Sri Lanka Delegation to the Regional Meeting of the Commonwealth Heads of Government.	

== 1981 ==
No.	Country	Areas visited	Date(s)	Purpose(s)	Notes	Ref.
5	Saudi Arabia	Riyadh	September 1981	State visit		

== 1983 ==
No.	Country	Areas visited	Date(s)	Purpose(s)	Notes	Ref.
6	India	New Delhi	February 1983	7th Summit of the Non-Aligned Movement	See also: India–Sri Lanka relations	
7	Italy	Rome	June 1983	Private visit	See also: Italy–Sri Lanka relations	
7	Egypt	Cairo	June 1983	State visit		
7	Bahrain	Manama	June 1983	Private visit		
8	India	New Delhi; Goa	November 1983	1983 Commonwealth Heads of Government Meeting	See also: India–Sri Lanka relations	

== 1984 ==
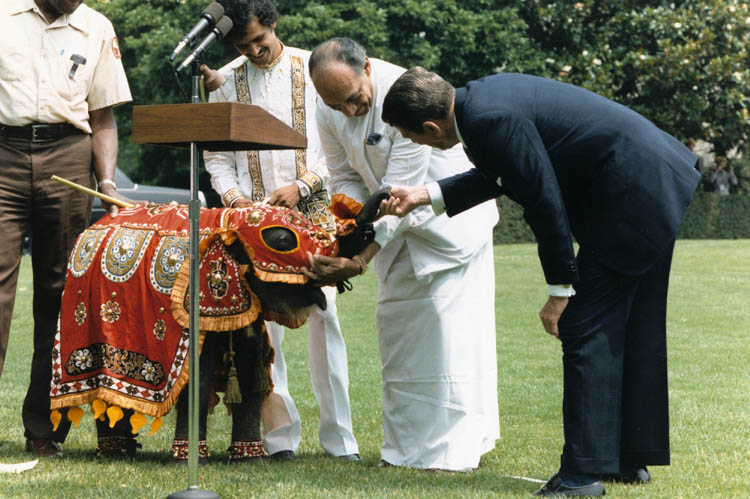
President Jayewardene of Sri Lanka presents a baby elephant to President Reagan and the American people in 1984. President Jayawardene was known for his pro-U.S. policies.

No.	Country	Areas visited	Date(s)	Purpose(s)	Notes	Ref.
9	China	Beijing	20–25 May 1984	State visit	See also: China–Sri Lanka relations First visit to China since establiment of diplomatic relations in 1957. Met with paramount leader Deng Xiaoping, President Li Xiannian, and prime minister Zhao Ziyang.	
9	Japan	Tokyo	25–27 May 1984	Unofficial visit	See also: Japan–Sri Lanka relations Unofficial visit.	
9	South Korea	Seoul	27–? May 1984	State visit	Met with President Chun Doo-hwan.	
10	United States	Washington, D.C.; Williamsburg; Santa Fe; Niagara Falls; New York City	17–20 June 1984	State visit	See also: Sri Lanka–United States relations State visit hosted by President Ronald Reagan. Discussed military aid, Voice of America agreement, and potential U.S. Navy facilities in Trincomalee; secured weapons through intermediaries like Israel and Pakistan. Presented a baby elephant as a gift.	
11	United Kingdom	London	23–29 June 1984	Private visit	See also: Sri Lanka–United Kingdom relations Met with Queen Elizabeth II and had dinner with prime minister Margaret Thatcher.	
12	India	New Delhi	1–? July 1984	State visit	See also: India–Sri Lanka relations Met with Prime minister Indira Gandhi for talks.	

== 1985 ==
No.	Country	Areas visited	Date(s)	Purpose(s)	Notes	Ref.
13	Pakistan	Islamabad	29 March–4 April 1985	State visit	See also: Pakistan–Sri Lanka relations Met with President Muhammad Zia-ul-Haq.	
14	India	New Delhi	June 1985	State visit	See also: India–Sri Lanka relations Met with Prime minister Rajiv Gandhi and planned a joint visit to Bangladesh.	
15	The Bahamas	Nassau	16–20 October 1985	1985 Commonwealth Heads of Government Meeting		
15	Cuba	Havana	20–? October 1985	State visit	See also: Cuba–Sri Lanka relations Met with President Fidel Castro.	
16	Bangladesh	Dhaka	7–8 December 1985	1st SAARC summit	See also: Bangladesh–Sri Lanka relations	

== 1986 ==
No.	Country	Areas visited	Date(s)	Purpose(s)	Notes	Ref.
17	India	Bangalore	16–17 October 1986	2nd SAARC summit	See also: India–Sri Lanka relations	

== 1987 ==
No.	Country	Areas visited	Date(s)	Purpose(s)	Notes	Ref.
18	Nepal	Kathmandu	November 1987	3rd SAARC summit	See also: Nepal–Sri Lanka relations	
19	India		5–7 November 1987	State visit	See also: India–Sri Lanka relations	

== 1988 ==
No.	Country	Areas visited	Date(s)	Purpose(s)	Notes	Ref.
20	Pakistan	Islamabad	29–31 December 1988	4th SAARC summit	See also: Pakistan–Sri Lanka relations	
