= List of international presidential trips made by Gotabaya Rajapaksa =

Gotabaya Rajapaksa served as the 8th President of Sri Lanka from 18 November 2019 to 14 July 2022. This article documents all international presidential trips made by Rajapaksa during his term in office. Rajapaksa did not make any visits in 2020 due to the COVID-19 pandemic.

== Summary of international trips ==
During his term, Gotabaya Rajapaksa made 6 foreign trips to 6 countries.

| No. of visits | Country |
|---|---|
| 2 | Singapore |
| 1 | India, Maldives, United Arab Emirates, United Kingdom, United States |

== 2019 ==
| | Country | Areas visited | Date(s) | Purpose(s) | Notes |
|---|---|---|---|---|---|
| 1 | India | New Delhi | 28–30 November | State visit | See also: India–Sri Lanka relations State visit at the invitation of Indian Prime Minister Narendra Modi. Rajapaksa met Indian President Ram Nath Kovind, Minister of External Affairs Dr. S. Jaishankar and engaged in bilateral discussions with the Prime Minister. Rajapaksa's first overseas visit after being elected. |

== 2021 ==
| | Country | Areas visited | Date(s) | Purpose(s) | Notes |
|---|---|---|---|---|---|
| 2 | United States | New York City | 18–26 September | United Nations General Assembly & bilateral meetings | See also: United States-Sri Lanka relations To attend the 76st United Nations General Assembly session, where he delivered a special address. Rajapaksa will hold bilateral discussions with several heads of states. |
| 3 | United Kingdom | Glasgow, Scotland | 30 October–13 November | 2021 United Nations Climate Change Conference | See also: Sri Lanka–United Kingdom relations Rajapaksa visited 2021 United Nations Climate Change Conference. |
| 4 | United Arab Emirates | Abu Dhabi | 3–5 December | Indian Ocean Conference | See also: Sri Lanka–United Arab Emirates relations Rajapaksa visited the United Arab Emirates to attend the Indian Ocean Conference. |
| 5 | Singapore | Singapore | 13–16 December | Private visit | Rajapaksa visited Singapore on an unscheduled personal visit for medical purposes. |

== 2022 ==
| | Country | Areas visited | Date(s) | Purpose(s) | Notes |
|---|---|---|---|---|---|
| 6 | Maldives | Malé | 13–14 July | Self-exile and resignation | See also: Maldives–Sri Lanka relations Accompanied by his spouse and a personal security detail, Rajapaksa fled from Sri Lanka on 13 July following widespread protests led by civilians demanding his resignation, triggered by extensive discontent over his handling of the country's economic crisis. |
| 6 | Singapore | Singapore | 14 July–11 August | Self-exile and resignation | After staying in the Maldives for two days, Rajapaksa further retreated to Singapore on 14 July. The same day, whilst in exile, Rajapaksa resigned from the presidency, becoming the first Sri Lankan president to relinquish the office mid-term. |

== Multilateral meetings participated in by Rajapaksa ==
| Group | Year | | | |
| Group | 2019 | 2020 | 2021 | 2022 |
|---|---|---|---|---|
| ACD | none | none | none | none |
| CHOGM | none | none | none | none |
| G-15 | none | none | none | none |
| NAM | none | none | none | none |
| SCO | none | none | none | none |
| SAARC | none | none | none | none |
| Others | none | none | UN Climate Change; 31 October, Glasgow | none |
| Others | none | none | Indian Ocean Conference; 3 December, Abu Dhabi | none |
██ = Did not attend; ██ = Future event
