= List of international presidential trips made by Ranasinghe Premadasa =

Ranasinghe Premadasa served as the 3rd President of Sri Lanka 2 January 1989 to 1 May 1993. This article documents all international presidential trips made by Premadasa during his term in office. Premadasa made no international trips between 1989 and 1991.

== Summary of international trips ==
During his term in office, Ranasinghe Premadasa made 2 foreign trips to 6 countries.

No. of visits	Country
2	Bangladesh
1	Bhutan, India, Maldives, Nepal, Pakistan

== 1992 ==
No.	Country	Areas visited	Date(s)	Purpose(s)	Notes	Ref.
1	Pakistan	Islamabad	23 September–1 October 1992	State visit	See also: Pakistan–Sri Lanka relations Embarked on a 7-country tour as South Asian Association for Regional Cooperation (SAARC) chair. Met with President Ghulam Ishaq Khan.	
1	India	New Delhi	1–3 October 1992	State visit	See also: India–Sri Lanka relations Visited the country as SAARC chairman. Met with prime minister P. V. Narasimha Rao.	
1	Nepal	Kathmandu	October 1992	State visit	See also: Nepal–Sri Lanka relations Visited the country as SAARC chairman.	
1	Bhutan	Thimphu	October 1992	State visit	Visited the country as SAARC chairman.	
1	Bangladesh	Dhaka	October 1992	State visit	See also: Bangladesh–Sri Lanka relations Visited the country as SAARC chairman.	
1	Maldives	Malé	October 1992	State visit	See also: Maldives–Sri Lanka relations Visited the country as SAARC chairman.	

== 1993 ==
No.	Country	Areas visited	Date(s)	Purpose(s)	Notes	Ref.
2	Bangladesh	Dhaka	10–11 April 1993	7th SAARC summit	See also: Bangladesh–Sri Lanka relations	
