= List of international prime ministerial trips made by Ranil Wickremesinghe =

Ranil Wickremesinghe served as the 10th Prime Minister of Sri Lanka from 9 January 2015 to 21 November 2019. In addition, Wickremesinghe was prime minister from 1993 to 1994, 2001 to 2004 and for a few months in 2022. This article only documents international trips made by Wickremesinghe during his term from 2015 to 2019, and does not list any trips made during his other terms as prime minister.

== Summary of International Trips ==
During his term, Ranil Wickremesinghe made 21 foreign trips to 15 countries.

| No. of visits | Country |
|---|---|
| 3 | India, Vietnam |
| 2 | China, Japan, Singapore, Switzerland |
| 1 | Australia, Finland, Hong Kong, Indonesia, Maldives, New Zealand, Norway, United Kingdom, United States |

== 2015 ==
| | Country | Areas visited | Date(s) | Purpose(s) | Notes |
|---|---|---|---|---|---|
| 1 | India | New Delhi | 14–16 September | State visit | Main article: Sri Lanka–India relations The first overseas visit made by prime minister Ranil Wickeremesinghe on the invitation of Indian prime minister Narendra Modi. |
| 2 | Japan | Osaka; Tokyo | 4–8 October | State visit | Main article: Japan–Sri Lanka relations: Visited on the invitation of Japanese prime minister Shinzo Abe.; Wickremesinghe delivered a special lecture at the inaugural ceremony of Japan Science and Technology Association's annual sessions in Kyoto; Addressed the Japanese Diet (Parliament), thus making Wickremesinghe the third world leader to addressed the Diet of Japan. |

== 2016 ==
| | Country | Areas visited | Date(s) | Purpose(s) | Notes |
|---|---|---|---|---|---|
| 3 | Switzerland | Davos | 19–23 January | Official visit | Main article: Sri Lanka–Switzerland relations Attended the World Economic Forum. |
| 4 | China | Beijing | 6–9 April | State visit | Main article: China–Sri Lanka relations Visit made on the invitation of the Government of China. |
| 5 | Singapore | Singapore | 17–19 July | State visit | The first state visit of Ranil Wickremesinghe to Singapore by the invitation of Singapore Prime Minister Lee Hsien Loong. |
| 6 | Indonesia | Jakarta | 1–3 August | Official visit | Main article: Indonesia–Sri Lanka relations To attend the 12th World Islamic Economic Forum (WIEF). |
| 7 | New Zealand | Auckland | 1–3 October | State visit | On the invitation of New Zealand Prime Minister John Key. |
| 8 | Hong Kong | Hong Kong | 4–7 November | Official visit | Attended the fifteenth Asia-Pacific Conference of German Business 2016. |

== 2017 ==
| | Country | Areas visited | Date(s) | Purpose(s) | Notes |
|---|---|---|---|---|---|
| 9 | Switzerland | Davos | 16–21 January | Official visit | Main article: Sri Lanka–Switzerland relations Attended the World Economic Forum. |
| 10 | Australia | Melbourne; Canberra | 13–16 February | State visit | Main article: Sri Lanka–Australia relations On the invitation of Australian prime minister Malcolm Turnbull and to receive the honorary doctorate in law at the graduation ceremony of Deakin University. |
| 11 | Japan | Tokyo | 10–16 April | State visit | Main article: Japan–Sri Lanka relations Visited on the invitation of Japanese prime minister Shinzo Abe. |
| 11 | Vietnam | Hanoi | 16–19 April | State visit | Visited on the invitation of Vietnamese prime minister Nguyễn Xuân Phúc and Vietnamese President Trần Đại Quang.; Wickremesinghe cut the visit short by one day to return to Sri Lanka after the 2017 Meethotamulla landslide left 32 dead in Colombo. |
| 12 | United States | New York City | 5–6 May | The Ocean Conference | Wickremesinghe met United Nations Secretary-General António Guterres at "The Ocean Conference" organized by the United Nations. |
| 13 | China | Beijing | 13–16 May | Belt and Road Initiative | Main article: China–Sri Lanka relations The second official visit by prime minister Ranil Wickremesinghe on the invitation of Government of China. |
| 14 | Finland | Helsinki | 9–11 October | State visit | On an invitation from the Prime Minister of Finland Juha Sipilä. |
| 15 | India | New Delhi | 21–23 November | State visit | Main article: India–Sri Lanka relations To meet Indian prime minister Narendra Modi and would call on Indian President Ram Nath Kovind. |

== 2018 ==
| | Country | Areas visited | Date(s) | Purpose(s) | Notes |
|---|---|---|---|---|---|
| 16 | Singapore | Singapore | 8–9 July | World Cities Summit | |
| 17 | Vietnam | Hanoi | 27–29 August | 3rd Indian Ocean Conference | |
| 18 | Vietnam | Hanoi | 11–13 September | The World Economic Forum on ASEAN | |
| 19 | Norway | Oslo | 3–6 October | State visit | On an invitation from Norwegian prime minister Erna Solberg. |
| 19 | United Kingdom | London | 7–9 October | State visit | Main article: Sri Lanka–United Kingdom relations On an invitation from British prime minister Theresa May. |
| 20 | India | New Delhi | 20–22 October | State visit | Main article: Sri Lanka–India relations State visit on the invitation of Indian prime minister Narendra Modi. |

== 2019 ==
| | Country | Areas visited | Date(s) | Purpose(s) | Notes |
|---|---|---|---|---|---|
| 21 | Maldives | Malé | 2–4 September | State visit | Main article: Maldives–Sri Lanka relations State visit on the invitation of Maldivian President Ibrahim Mohamed Solih. |
