= Nadeesha =

Nadeesha (Tamil: நதீஷா; Sinhala: නදීෂා) is a Sri Lankan female given name. Notable people with the name include:

- Nadeesha Gayanthi (born 1984), Sri Lankan badminton player
- Nadeesha Dilhani Lekamge (born 1987), Sri Lankan javelin thrower
- Nadeesha Ramanayake (born 1994), Sri Lankan track and field athlete
- Nadeesha Uyangoda (born 1993), Sri Lankan-Italian writer, author and podcaster

== See also ==
- Nadeeshan
