= Japanese people in Sri Lanka =

Japanese diaspora in Sri Lanka

- (Japan) (Sri Lanka)

Total population
- 678 (2022)

Languages
- Japanese, English, Sinhalese, Tamil

Related ethnic groups
- Japanese diaspora

Japanese people in Sri Lanka are people of Japanese ancestry living in Sri Lanka.

== Demographics ==
Historical population
Year	Pop.	±%
2005	778	—
2017	767	−1.4%
2022	678	−11.6%

There were appropriately 778 of them as of August 2005. As of 2022, there are approximately 678 of them.

== See also ==
- Japan – Sri Lanka relations
- Japanese School in Colombo
