= Sri Lankans in Italy =

Total population
- 109,968 (2016)

Regions with significant populations
- Lombardy: 30,000
- Lazio
- Southern Italy

Languages
- English · Sinhala · Tamil · Italian

Religion
- Theravada Buddhism · Hinduism · Roman Catholicism

Related ethnic groups
- Sri Lankan

There are over 100,000 Sri Lankans in Italy. Many are permanent residents or have moved there in search of work.

== History ==
Early sources show that Sri Lankans have had a presence in the areas of present-day Italy since the Roman times. According to historian Pliny, four people from Sri Lanka visited the court of Emperor Claudius in 50 AD. There was another delegation from Sri Lanka into Rome during the era of Emperor Julian in 375 AD. There were strong links between the two countries and Sri Lanka was known as 'Taprobane' to the Romans.

Sri Lankans started to migrate to Italy in the 1970s. Italy was attractive to the migrants due to perceived easier employment opportunities and entry, compared to other European countries. The first immigration waves during the second half of the Eighties consisted mainly of Tamils, followed by Sinhalese at the beginning of the 1990s.

In the late 1970s, Catholic women migrated to Italy to work in elderly homes. Many Sri Lankans have also illegally migrated to Italy. Admission acts also encouraged more Sri Lankans to migrate to Italy. For example, the Dini Decree in 1996 made it easier for Sri Lankan workers to bring their families to Italy. In Rome, Naples and Milan, the Sri Lankans have built up "enlarged families", where jobs are exchanged among relatives and compatriots.

== Demographics ==
Sociologist Enrica Morlicchio estimated in 1992 that 2/3 of the Sri Lankan population in Italy was Sinhalese and Tamils constituted 1/3. The major Sinhalese communities in Italy are located in Lombardy (particularly Milan), Lazio (particularly Rome), Naples, and Sicily (particularly Palermo, Messina and Catania). Most Italian Sinhalese work as domestic workers. But they have also opened businesses such as restaurants, cleaning enterprises (e.g. Cooperativa Multietnica di Pulizie Sud-Est), call centres, video-shops, traditional food shops and minimarkets. Sinhalese are the majority of Sri Lankan Italians in most of Italy, and Sri Lankan Tamils contribute the majority of Sri Lankan Italians in Sicily.

== Community ==
The major community organisation representing Sri Lankans in Italy is the Sri Lanka Association Italy. Smaller community and political organisation exist in areas with a sizable Sri Lankan population such as the Sri Lanka Association Florence, Coordinamento Tamil, Centro Culturale Tamil, Sri Lanka Women's Association Napoli and Associazione dei Tamil in Italia. Several other organizations are based in cities including Naples, Bologna, Lecce, Reggio Emilia etc.

== Notable Sri Lankan Italians ==
- Hemantha Jayasena (born 1971) – cricketer
- Rigivan Ganeshamoorthy (born 1999) – Paralympic discus thrower and medallist
- Samantha de Mel (born 1964) – cricketer
- Sepala Ekanayake – hijacker of the Alitalia Boeing 747
- Nadeesha Uyangoda (born 1993), journalist and activist

== See also ==
- Italy–Sri Lanka relations
- Sri Lankan diaspora
- Sri Lankan Americans
- Sri Lankan Australians
- Sri Lankan Canadians
- Sri Lankan New Zealanders
- Sri Lankans in France
- Sri Lankans in Switzerland
- Sri Lankans in the United Kingdom
