= Robert Knox (sailor) =

English sea captain for the British East India Company

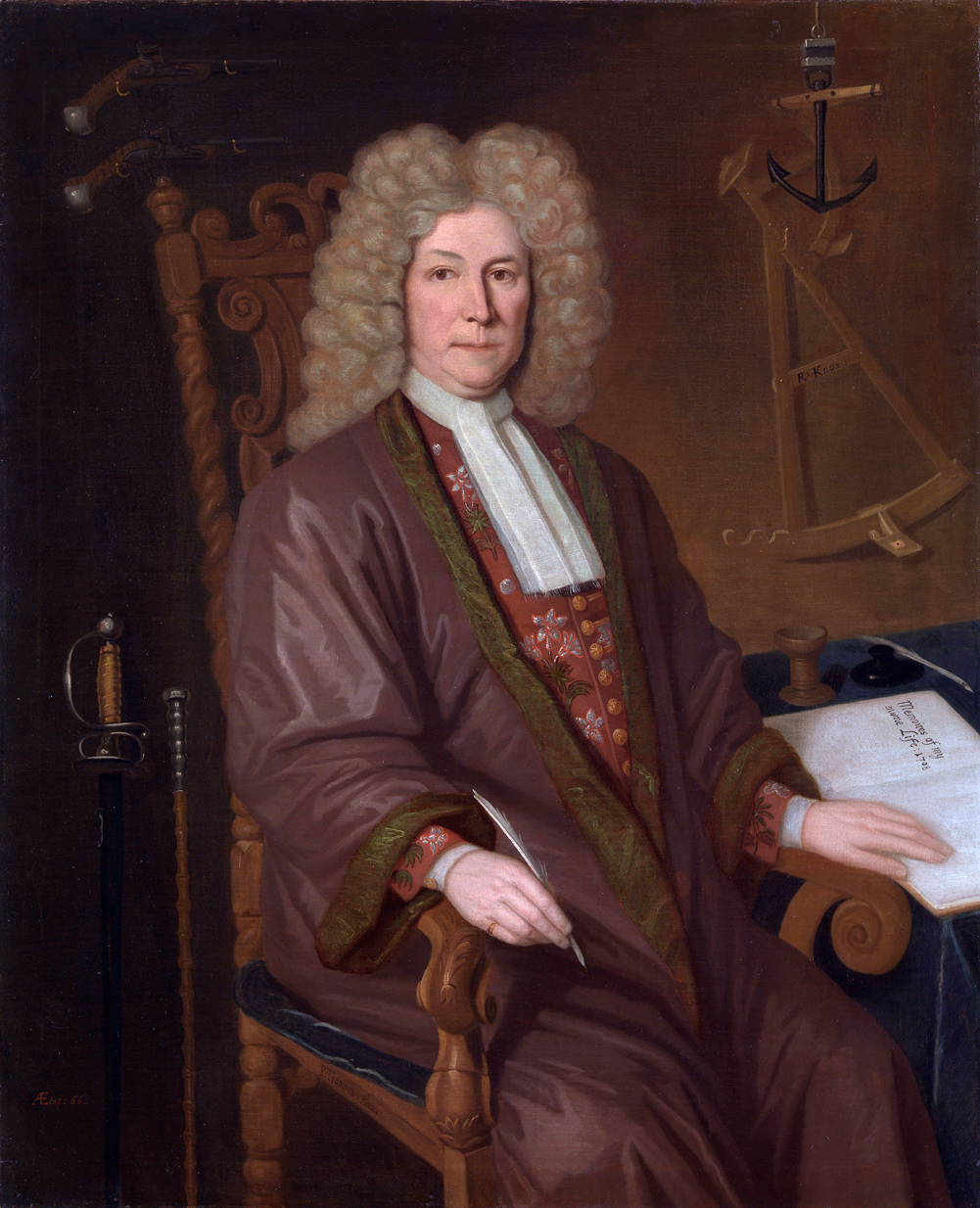
- Robert Knox (P. Trampon, 1711)
- Born: Robert Knox; 8 February 1641; Tower Hill, London
- Died: 19 June 1720 (aged 79); St Peter le Poer, London
- Resting place: St Mary's Church, Wimbledon
- Occupations: Sea captain, trader, writer
- Employer: East India Company
- Known for: being a captive in Ceylon for 20 years
- Notable work: An Historical Relation of the Island Ceylon

Robert Knox (8 February 1641 – 19 June 1720) was an English sea captain in the service of the British East India Company. He was the son of another sea captain, also named Robert Knox.

== Life ==
Born at Tower Hill in London, the young Knox spent most of his childhood in Surrey and was taught by James Fleetwood, later the Bishop of Winchester. He joined his father's crew on the ship Anne for his first voyage to India in 1655, at the age of 14, before returning to England in 1657. That year, Oliver Cromwell issued a charter granting the East India Company a monopoly of the Eastern trade, requiring the elder Knox and his crew to join the service of the Company.

The two Knoxes sailed for Persia in January 1658. They suffered the loss of the ship's mast in a storm on 19 November 1659, forcing them to put ashore on Ceylon, now Sri Lanka. The ship was impounded and sixteen of the crew, including the Knoxes, were taken captive by the troops of the ruler of Kandy, Rajasinghe II. The elder Knox had inadvertently angered the king by not observing the expected formalities and had the misfortune to do so during a period of conflict between the king and the Dutch East India Company. Although the crew was forbidden from leaving the kingdom, they were treated fairly leniently; the younger Knox was able to establish himself as a farmer, moneylender and pedlar. Both men suffered severely from malaria and the elder Knox died in February 1661 after a long illness.

Robert Knox eventually escaped with one companion, Stephen Rutland, after nineteen years of captivity. The two men were able to reach Arippu, a Dutch fort on the north-west coast of the island. The Dutch treated Knox generously and transported him to Batavia (now Jakarta) in the Dutch East Indies, from where he was able to return home on an English vessel, the Caesar. He arrived back in London in September 1680.

During the voyage Knox wrote the manuscript of An Historical Relation of the Island Ceylon, an account of his experiences on Ceylon, which was published in 1681. In 2004, this book was translated into the Sinhala language as "Knox Dutu Lakdiva" by Premachandra Alwis. The book was accompanied by engravings showing the inhabitants, their customs and agricultural techniques. It attracted widespread interest at the time and made Knox internationally famous, influencing Daniel Defoe's Robinson Crusoe as well as sparking a friendship with Robert Hooke of the Royal Society. It is one of the earliest and most detailed European accounts of life on Ceylon and is today seen as an invaluable record of the island in the 17th century.

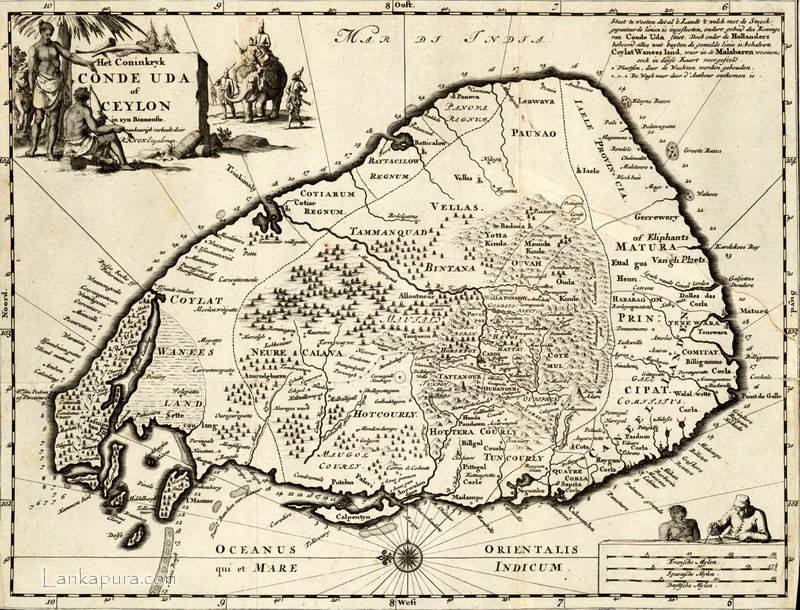
Original version: A new map of the Kingdom of Candy Uda, in the island of Ceylon, published by Robert Knox around 1681.

Knox became a close friend and collaborator of Robert Hooke, for whom he frequently brought back gifts from his travels. In return, Hooke took Knox to the local coffeehouses for chocolate and tobacco, then considered luxuries. On one occasion, Knox presented Hooke with samples of "a strange intoxicating herb like hemp" which he dubbed "Indian hemp" or "Bangue"; it is better known today as Cannabis indica, a plant which was unknown at the time in Europe. Hooke gave an address to the Society in December 1689 in which he provided what was the first detailed description of cannabis in English, commending its possible curative properties and noting that Knox "has so often experimented it himself, that there is no Cause of Fear, tho' possibly there may be of Laughter." Knox also described termites, bees and ants in Ceylon. Knox was present when Hooke died on 3 March 1703 after a long illness and took on the responsibility of arranging his friend's burial.

Knox continued to work for the East India Company for thirteen years after his return from the East, captaining the ship Tonqueen Merchant for four further voyages to the East. He enjoyed only mixed success and quarrelled with the company, which eventually dismissed him in 1694. Four years later he set himself up on his own trading vessel, the Mary, but the venture was not a success. He returned permanently to England in 1701 and spent his retirement writing about Ceylon and his life. He died, prosperous but unmarried, at St Peter le Poer in the City of London in June 1720 and was buried at St Mary's Church, Wimbledon.
