= Sri Lanka–United Arab Emirates relations =

- Sri Lanka: United Arab Emirates

Sri Lanka–United Arab Emirates relations are the bilateral diplomatic, economic, and cultural relations between the Democratic Socialist Republic of Sri Lanka and the United Arab Emirates (UAE).

== History ==
Diplomatic relations between Sri Lanka and the United Arab Emirates were established in 1979. Sri Lanka opened its embassy in Abu Dhabi the same year.

The Consulate of Sri Lanka in Dubai was established in 1993 and later upgraded to a Consulate General in 1999.

== Visits ==
In February 2025, Sri Lankan President Anura Kumara Dissanayake visited the UAE to attend the World Government Summit and held meetings with senior UAE leaders to discuss cooperation in investment, tourism, and trade.

In April 2025, Sheikh Abdullah bin Zayed Al Nahyan, Deputy Prime Minister and Minister of Foreign Affairs of the UAE, paid an official visit to Sri Lanka.

== Economic relations ==
The UAE is the largest of Sri Lanka's trading partners in the Middle East. Major Sri Lankan exports are tea, apparel, and gems, while exports from UAE largely consist of petroleum products and machinery. Bilateral trade in 2018 was worth USD 2.13 billion.

UAE is the largest source of investments into Sri Lanka from the Middle East with 65% of Middle Eastern investment in Sri Lanka originating from the UAE, mainly in the construction, hospitality, manufacturing, logistics, communications and information technology.

In 2025, Sri Lanka and the UAE signed an Agreement on the Promotion and Protection of Investments.

== Labour migration and diaspora ==
300,000 Sri Lankans work in the UAE as foreign workers with one third doing white-collar jobs.

== Aid ==
After Cyclone Ditwah hit Sri Lanka in December 2025, the UAE sent Boeing C-17 Globemaster III aircraft loaded with supplies of aid including food, gear and temporary housing for those affected by the disaster. A UAE Search and Rescue Team affiliated with the Abu Dhabi Civil Defence Authority helped recover the dead and treat the injured.

== See also ==
- Foreign relations of Sri Lanka
- Foreign relations of the United Arab Emirates
