= Cuba–Sri Lanka relations =

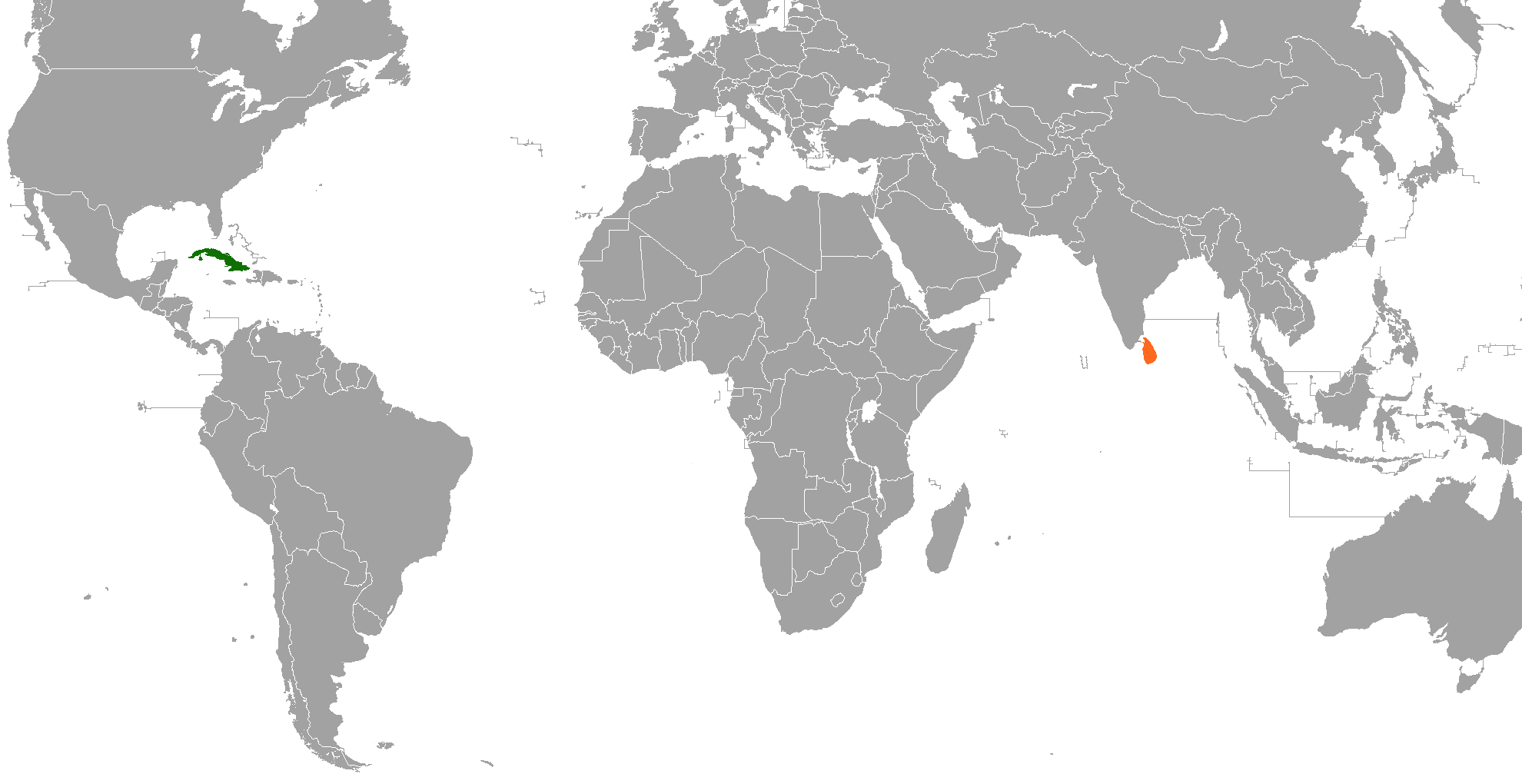

- Cuba: Sri Lanka

Cuba and Sri Lanka have had official diplomatic relations since 1959. Cuba has an embassy in Colombo and Sri Lanka has an embassy in Havana.

== History ==
The current government of Cuba and the government of Sri Lanka established ties shortly after Fidel Castro's ascent to power in 1959. Ties were officially made on July 29, 1959, and Cuba and Sri Lanka recently celebrated the golden jubilee of this occasion after fifty years of bilateral ties. Sri Lanka was one of the first countries to recognize Cuba, when Che Guevara (then Industry Minister) visited Sri Lanka on a delegation to promote the sugar trade. The 2 countries had an unofficial relationship through trading in the late 1800s to early 1900s which was then made official in 1959. This resulted in mixed communities in both countries. There are many Sri Lankan medical students studying in Cuba, as well as Cuban sports trainers hired to work in Sri Lanka.

== Non-Alignment ==
Both Sri Lanka and Cuba were members of the Non-aligned movement, which rejected a bipolar domination of world affairs. Though many members of the Non-Alignment Movement were embroiled in intra-member conflicts, Cuban-Sri Lankan relations were quite cordial. Prime Minister Junius Richard Jayawardene visited Cuba in 1979 to promote the aims of the movement, while the respective governments signed a number of agreements in the 1970s to further cement ideological ties. These included a cultural agreement, signed in 1976 and amended many times later, and a Scientific and Technical agreement which was signed in 1978 and later buttressed by later added protocols. Cuba also supported Sri Lanka by rejecting the 2012 U.S. sponsored resolution.

== Economic ties ==
Cuba and Sri Lanka have cooperated in a number of sectors with the goal of mutual development and economic progress. This cooperation has been especially noted in the sectors of risk management and biotechnology. Ties in the agriculture sector have been developed, and the similar climates of both countries have enabled the countries to work on developing crops such as papaya and coconut. Many traders from the Havana region of Cuba have settled in the North & North West of Sri Lanka in the early 20th century and made communities which no longer seem to be visible. However some cultural influences still hold, such as the Cuban contributions to Baila, a form of dance music popular on the island of Sri Lanka originated centuries ago among the 'kaffir' or Afro-Sinhalese communities (mixed communities of Portuguese, African and native Sinhalese people). Small Sri Lankan communities are still present in some parts of Cuba, as well as people of Cuban mixed heritage in the northernmost parts of Sri Lanka.

== See also ==
- Foreign relations of Cuba
- Foreign relations of Sri Lanka
