= Nadeesha Uyangoda =

Sri Lankan-born Italian writer (born 1993)

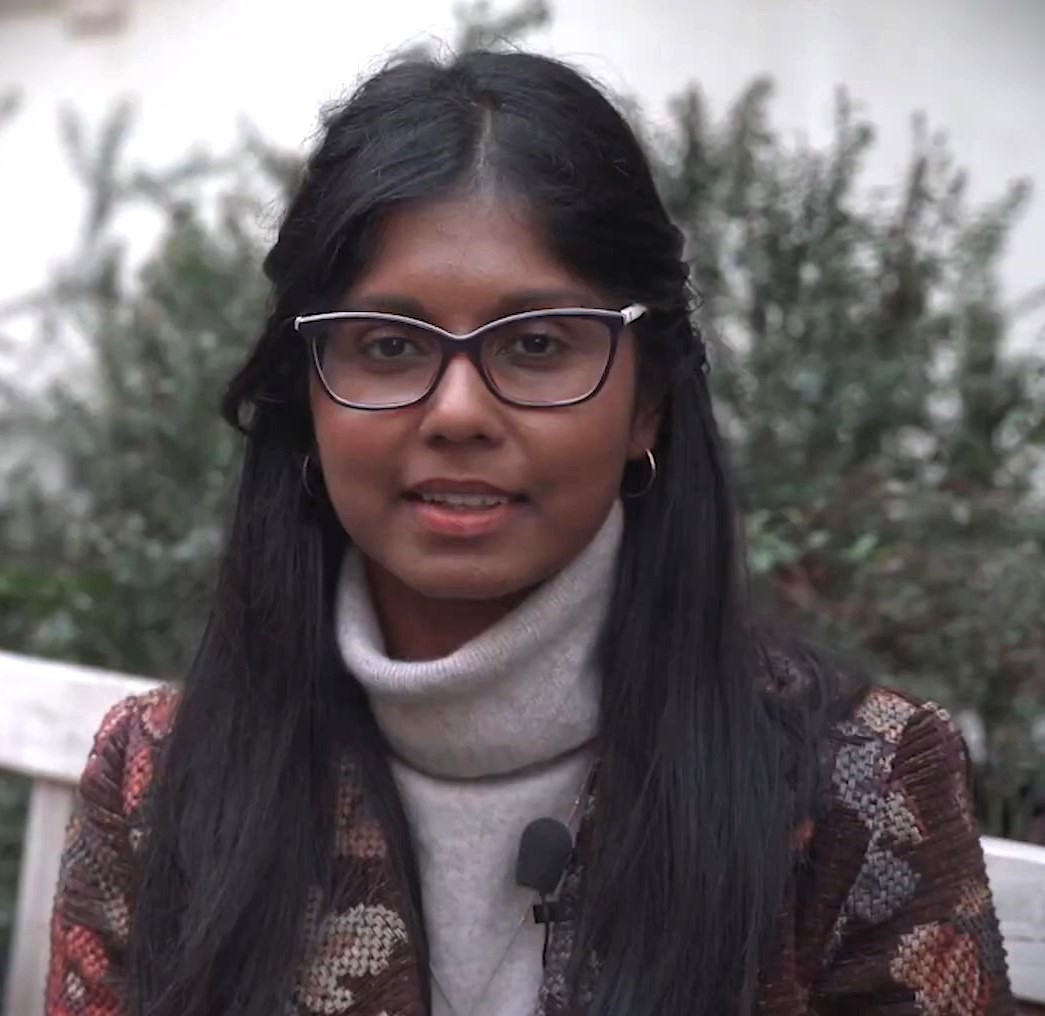
- Uyangoda in 2021
- Born: March 15, 1993 (age 33); Colombo, Sri Lanka
- Citizenship: Italy; Sri Lanka
- Occupations: Writer; podcaster; author
- Writing career
- Language: Italian; English
- Years active: 2021–present
- Notable works: Book: L'unica persona nera nella stanza (The Only Black Person in the Room); Podcast: Sulla razza (About Race)
- Website: www.nadeeshauyangoda.it

Nadeesha Uyangoda (born 15 March 1993) is a Sri Lankan-Italian writer, author and podcaster, whose work focuses on migration and identity. She is the author of L'unica persona nera nella stanza (The Only Black Person in the Room) and Corpi che contano (Bodies that Matter), as well as the host of the podcast Sulla razza (About Race). She has won multiple awards, including the Anima Prize for Literature.

== Biography ==
Born in Colombo, Sri Lanka, in 1993, Uyangoda fled the country with her family due to its civil war and arrived in Italy at the age of six. Due to her own and her family's experience of Italy's immigration policies, Uyangoda has been outspoken on migrant rights. She has called for second-generation Italian immigrants to be better represented at all levels of politics. She is also seen as part of a movement of second-generation migrants that uses social media to add their experiences to public discourse. Her writing focuses on migration and identity.

Her stories have appeared in Al Jazeera English, Open Democracy, The Telegraph. She is a columnist of the Italian magazine Internazionale where she runs the 'Il Libro' column.

== Career ==
=== L’unica persona nera nella stanza ===
Uyangoda is the author of L'unica persona nera nella stanza (The Only Black Person in the Room), which was published in Rome in 2021 by the publisher 66thand2nd. This memoir examined Uyangoda's experiences of racism in Italy, and its style was described by Annarita Taronna as "an intimate process of translingualism" as the text uses Italian, English and Sinhala to convey cross-cultural meaning. Taronna also compared it to works by Zadie Smith, Chimanda Ngozi Adichie and Taiye Selasi. Critical theorist and author Genevieve Makaping described Uyangoda as one voice in a new generation of Italian writers reflecting contemporary racism.

L'unica persona nera nella stanza was translated in Spanish and co-published by Esto no es Berlin and Los libros de La Mujer Rota.

=== Sulla Razza (About Race) ===
In April 2020 she created the podcast Sulla razza (About Race), sponsored by Juventus F.C. and produced by One Podcast. It focuses on racism, in particular translating and explaining the vocabulary used in Anglo-American contexts to discuss race. This language gap is something that Uyangoda felt was holding back racial discourse in Italy. One example she described is: "I'm a brown South Asian, but there's no term for brown people in Italian. So far these language gaps, which often don't convey just how multifaceted racism is, haven't been filled by mainstream media." Uyangoda co-hosts the podcast with Nathasha Fernando and Maria Catena Mancuso. It has been described as part of a cohort of podcasts discussing race that emerged in Italy as a result of the COVID-19 pandemic reducing opportunities for social interaction.

=== Other efforts ===
In 2023 she curated a section (Traiettorie Linguistiche) of BookPride, a leading independent book fair in Milan.

Uyangoda is a member of the scientific board of Museo delle culture (Milano), the Museum of Cultures of the Milan City Council.

In 2026, she joined the team of curators of Più libri più liberi, a national fair of small and medium-sized publishers, scheduled for 4-8 December in Rome.

== Works ==
Fiction

- Acqua Sporca (Dirty Water), Einaudi, 2025

=== Non-fiction ===
- L'unica persona nera nella stanza (The Only Black Person in the Room), 66thand2nd, 2021
- Corpi che contano (Bodies that Matter), 66thand2nd, 2024

=== Short stories and longforms ===
- Sostantivo, femminile, singolare, in K Volume 4 - Felicità, curated by Nadia Terranova, Linkiesta, 2022
- Microeconomie etniche, in The Passenger - Milano, Iperborea, 2022
- La distanza tra il piatto e noi, in L'integrale, rivista di pane e cultura - Straniero, curated by Diletta Sereni, Iperborea, 2023
- La lingua che abitiamo, on Lucy sulla cultura, 2023

== Awards ==
L'unica persona nera nella stanza

- Premio Anima per la Letteratura (Anima Prize for Literature) – 2021
- Premio Rapallo Speciale "Anna Maria Ortese" (Anna Maria Ortese Rapallo Special Prize) – 2021
- Premio Sila nella sezione "Economia e Società" (Sila Prize for 'Economy and Society') – 2022
- Premio Giuditta esordiente (Giuditta Esordiente Award) – 2022
