= An Historical Relation of the Island Ceylon =

1681 book by Robert Knox

- First edition
- Author: Robert Knox
- Language: English
- Subject: History, ethnography
- Genre: Non-fiction
- Publisher: Richard Chiswell
- Publication date: 1681
- Publication place: England
- Media type: Print

An Historical Relation of the Island Ceylon is a book written by the English trader and sailor Robert Knox in 1681. It describes his experiences some years earlier in the Kingdom of Kandy, on the island today known as Sri Lanka. It provides one of the most important contemporary accounts of 17th century Sri Lankan life.

== History ==
Knox spent 19 years in Sri Lanka after being taken prisoner by the Kingdom of Kandy during the reign of Rajasinha II. He survived by knitting caps, selling goods and lending rice and corn. He finally escaped with one companion in 1679 and reached Arippu, a Dutch settlement on the north-west coast of the island, from where he was able to return to England in 1680.

The book was written during the voyage to England. It came to the attention of Knox's employers, the directors of the British East India Company, who recommended its publication. The historian and biographer John Strype, Knox's cousin, helped him to prepare the book for publication with the encouragement of the natural philosopher and polymath Robert Hooke. It was printed by Richard Chiswell, the printer to the Royal Society, under the imprimaturs of the Society and the Company. When the book was published in 1681 it was widely read and was translated in Knox's lifetime into German (1689), Dutch (1692) and French (1693) editions. It made Knox internationally famous and was a major influence on the works of Daniel Defoe; Robinson Crusoe and the later Captain Singleton both draw on the experiences of Knox.

== Contents ==
The Relation has a wider literary importance in influencing the development of the English novel. Knox uses direct and idiomatic language to provide detailed descriptions of the factual reality that he saw during his time on Ceylon. He paints a portrait of himself as a practical, self-sufficient and robust individual, very much like Defoe's shipwrecked mariner. The book is of fundamental importance as a source for the economic history and anthropology of Ceylon during this period due to the objectivity and detail of the text, in which Knox provides closely observed descriptions of Sinhalese topography, economic and social life, cultural characteristics and conditions in the kingdom of Kandy. It is divided into four parts; the first three describe the kingdom of Kandy, and the final part details Knox's escape from captivity.

The preface provides maps and descriptions of Tamil royal and rural life in the country Vanni which he stumbled into in the north and east of the island. The book is accompanied by seventeen copperplate engravings of unknown provenance to illustrate topics addressed by Knox. The engravings are not particularly artistically accomplished, but they do fit the text well. However, the artist suffers from evidently not having seen his subjects; H. A. I. Goonetileke comments that "the animals are near caricatures and the human subjects are obviously based on more familiar European models." The non-English editions of the book imitate or adapt the original English engravings. The Dutch edition, for instance, incorporates engravings by Jan Luyken which are based on the English originals but provide a more animated setting, with more detailed backgrounds of buildings and landscapes.

Engravings found within the book
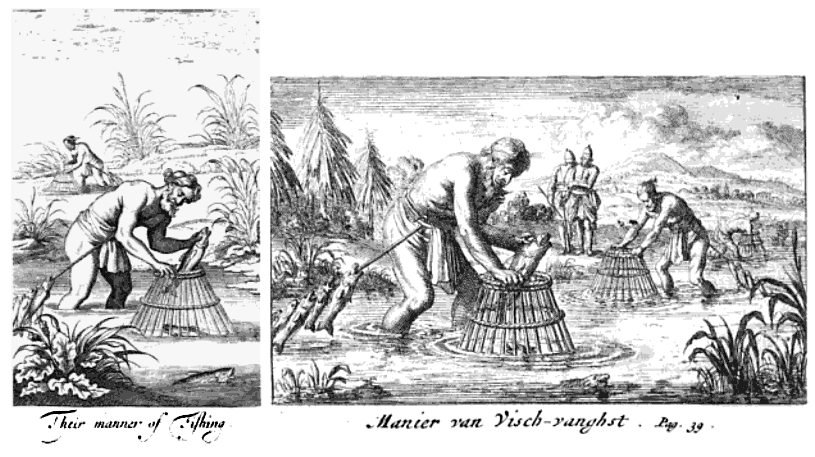
"Their manner of Fishing". Engravings from the 1681 (English) and 1692 (Dutch) editions of An Historical Relation

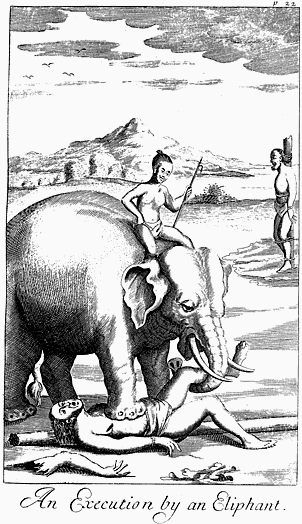
Depiction of an execution by elephant

== See also ==
- Daoyi Zhilüe
- Ceylon, Physical, Historical and Topographical
