= General debate of the fiftieth session of the United Nations General Assembly =

United Nations General Assembly General Debate

General Debate of the fiftieth session of the United Nations General Assembly
- 19 September – 3 October 1995 50th session 50th general debate

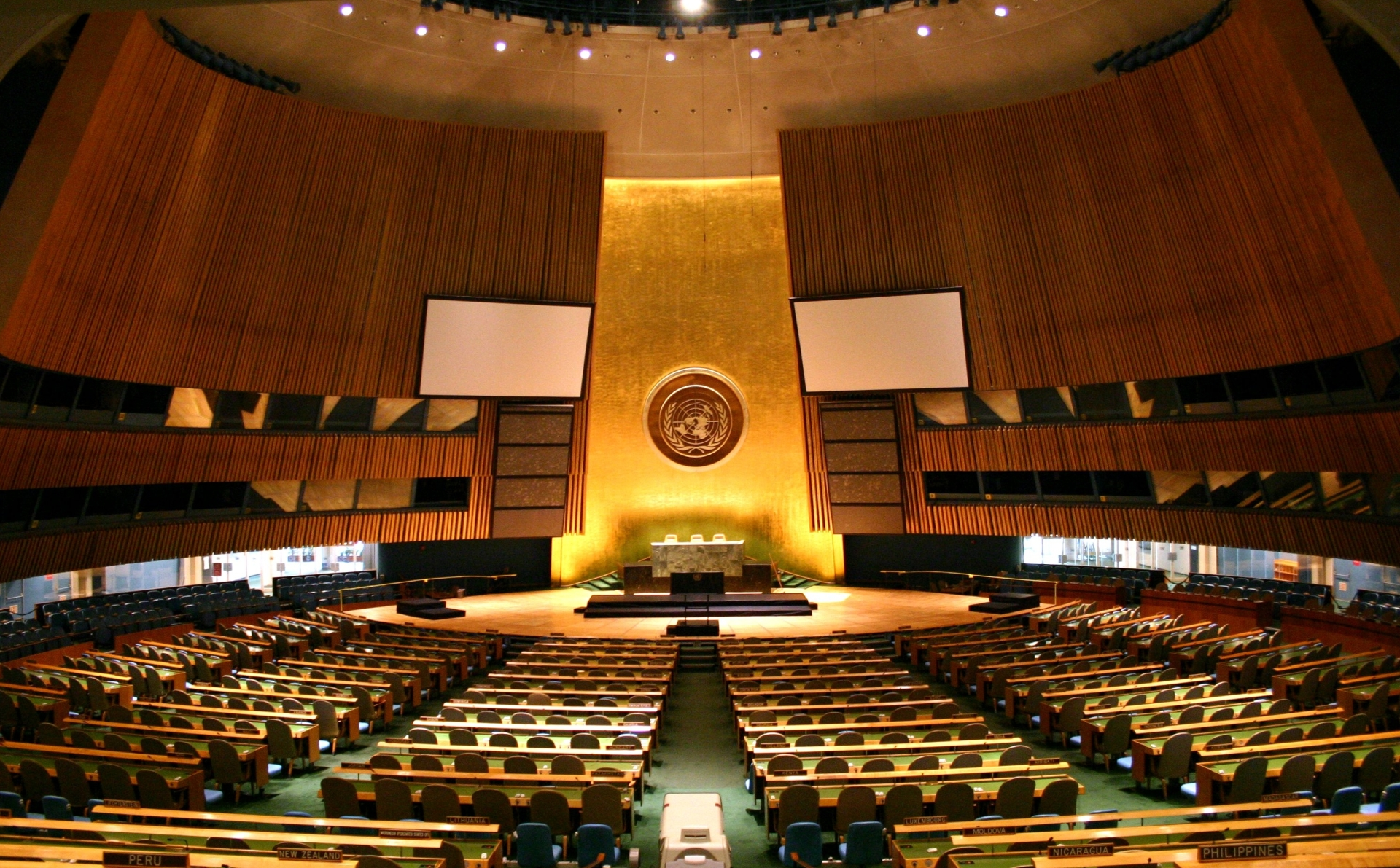
- General Assembly Hall at United Nations Headquarters, New York City
- Host country: United Nations
- Cities: New York City, United States
- Venues: General Assembly Hall at the United Nations Headquarters
- Participants: United Nations Member States
- President: Diogo Freitas do Amaral
- Secretary-General: Boutros Boutros-Ghali

The General Debate of the fiftieth session of the United Nations General Assembly commenced on 19 September 1995 and ended on 3 October 1995. Leaders from a number of member states and one observer state addressed the UNGA. Due to the absence of President Diogo Freitas do Amaral, Berrocal Soto of Costa Rica took the chair. The debate meeting was called to order at 10.15 a.m

== Speaking schedule ==
The order of speakers is given first to member states, then observer states and supranational bodies.

=== Thursday, October 5 ===
On October 3 the Acting President informed members that the General Assembly would not hold a general debate on Thursday morning, October 5. Instead, the General Assembly held a ceremonial session to listen to the statement of His Holiness Pope John Paul II, from the observer state of the Holy See, as part of the celebrations for the fiftieth anniversary of the United Nations. The ceremonial session took place at 10.30 a.m., and the general debate resumed on Thursday afternoon.

== See also ==
- Fiftieth session of the United Nations General Assembly
- List of UN General Assembly sessions
- List of General debates of the United Nations General Assembly
