= Sri Lanka–United Kingdom relations =

- Sri Lanka: United Kingdom

Diplomatic mission
- High Commission of Sri Lanka, London: British High Commission, Colombo

Envoy
- High Commissioner Nimal Senadheera: High Commissioner Andrew Patrick

Sri Lanka–United Kingdom relations, or British-Sri Lankan relations, are foreign relations between Sri Lanka and the United Kingdom.

== Historical overview ==
=== Pre-colonial British rule ===
The relationship between Sri Lanka and Western Europe goes back thousands of years, as Sri Lanka was a stop along East–West trade routes during the times of Ancient Rome and Greece.

During the reign of Emperor Claudius, a Mediterranean tax collector named Annius Plocamus facilitated direct trade and first contact between Sri Lanka and the Roman Empire. According to Pliny the Elder in his Natural History, it was when Annius Plocamus came to Sri Lanka that the two civilisations met. During this time, the Roman Empire was invading Britain. Many Romans knew Sri Lanka by the ancient Greek name of Taprobane.

After the fall of the Roman Empire, there was little contact or trade between Sri Lanka and Western Europe until the arrival of the Portuguese in 1505.

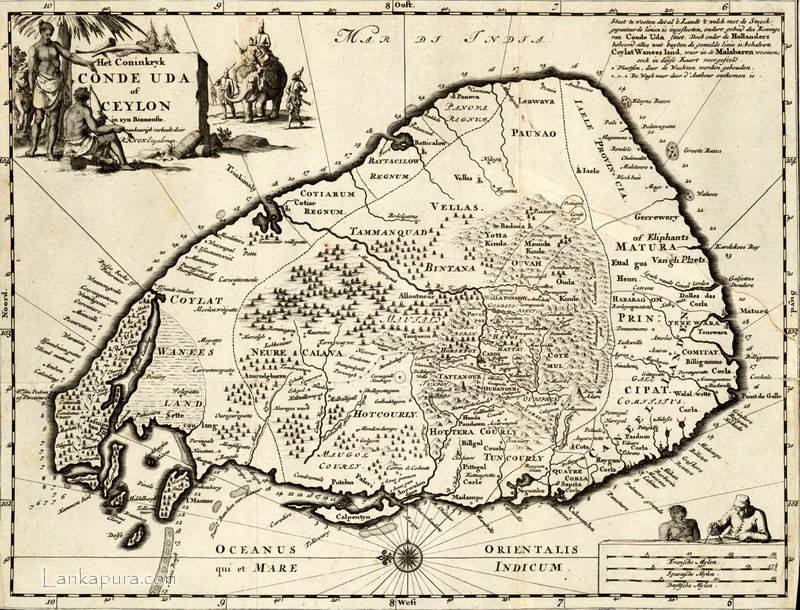
Robert Knox's map of Ceylon, published around 1681

Before Britain ruled the island of Sri Lanka (which they called Ceylon), British sailors reached the island. In the 17th century, the East India Company, which established British trade with Southeast Asia, increased trade with India and Ceylon. Robert Knox, a British sailor in the service of the East India Company, sailed to Persia with his father (also named Robert Knox) in January 1658 on the ship Anne. They suffered the loss of the ship's mast in a storm in November 1659, which forced them to put ashore on Ceylon. The ship was then impounded and both the Knoxes and the ship's crew were taken captive by troops of the Kandyan king, Rajasinghe II. Robert Knox (the younger) eventually escaped in 1679, after nineteen years of captivity; he fled to Arippu, a Dutch fort where he was treated generously by the Dutch. He was then transported to the Dutch East Indies, from where he was able to return home on an English vessel. During the return voyage, Knox wrote the manuscript An Historical Relation of the Island Ceylon about his experiences in Ceylon, which was published in 1681. The book was later translated to Sinhala.

=== British capture of Ceylon ===
During the Fourth Anglo-Dutch War, British forces led by Sir Edward Hughes captured Trincomalee (1782), a Dutch-controlled port in eastern Sri Lanka. Trincomalee was then captured by the French in the same year, followed by the subsequent Battle of Trincomalee between French and British fleets. It was restored to Dutch control after the Treaty of Paris in 1783.

During the Napoleonic Wars, Great Britain, fearing that French control of the Netherlands might cede Ceylon to the French, invaded and occupied the coastal areas of the island with little difficulty in 1796, ending Dutch Ceylon. In 1802, the Treaty of Amiens formally ceded the Dutch part of the island to Britain, and it became a crown colony known as British Ceylon.

From 1805 to 1815, Governor Thomas Maitland initiated legal and social reforms to strengthen the British power. These including a reform of the civil service to eliminate corruption, and the creation of a Ceylonese High Court based on the caste law. The Catholic population was enfranchised while the Dutch Reformed church lost its privileged position. Maitland also worked to undermine Buddhist authority and attract Europeans to the colony by offering grants of up to 4,000 acres (16 km^{2}) in Ceylon. In 1813, he was replaced by Sir Robert Brownrigg, who largely continued these policies.

=== Kandyan Wars ===
In 1803, the British invaded the Kingdom of Kandy in the First Kandyan War, but were repulsed.

In 1815, the British successfully invaded and occupied Kandy in the Second Kandyan War. The British discovered the hiding place of the last king of Kandy, Sri Vrikrama Rajasinha, who was then exiled and imprisoned in Vellore Fort in India, where he died 17 years later, in 1842. A treaty called the Kandyan Convention was signed, which stated the terms under which the Kandyans would live as a British protectorate. It declared that Buddhism would be protected by the British Crown and Christianity would not be imposed on the population. The treaty ended over 2,300 years of Sri Lankan independence.

The Kandyans rebelled against the British in the Uva Rebellion from 1817 to 1818. The rebellion was also known as the Third Kandyan War, and occurred in the Uva and Wellassa provinces of the former Kingdom of Kandy. The main cause of the rebellion was the failure by British authorities to upload Buddhist customary traditions, which the islanders viewed as integral parts of their lives. This rebellion led to the British colonial government to adopt a scorched earth policy in order to suppress it. The British won, and the Kingdom of Kandy was annexed into British Ceylon in 1817.

=== British rule ===
Flag of British Ceylon

British Ceylon was run as a colony affiliated to British India from 1817. During British rule on the island, the Kandyan peasantry were stripped of their lands by the Crown Lands (Encroachments) Ordinance No. 12 of 1840 (sometimes called the Crown Lands Ordinance or the Waste Lands Ordinance). This was a modern enclosure movement and reduced penury following the Uva Rebellion. The British found that the uplands of Sri Lanka were well-suited for coffee, tea, and rubber cultivation, and by the mid-19th century, Ceylon tea had become a staple of the British market, bringing great wealth to a small class of European tea planters. To work the estates, the planters imported large numbers of Tamil workers as indentured labourers from south India, who soon made up 10% of the island's population. These workers lived in harsh conditions in line rooms, not very different from cattle sheds.

The British colonial government favoured some ethnic groups—the semi-European Burghers, certain high-caste Sinhalese, and the Tamils, who were mainly concentrated to the north of the country—while ignoring the other ethnic groups on the island. Nevertheless, the British also introduced democratic elements to Sri Lanka for the first time in its history. The Burghers were given some degree of self-government as early as 1833. It was not until 1909 that constitutional development began with a partly elected assembly, and not until 1920 that elected members outnumbered official appointees. Universal suffrage was introduced in 1931, despite protests by the Sinhalese, Tamil, and Burgher elite who objected to the common people being allowed to vote. Major political reforms started with the Donoughmore Commission, which proposed the constitution used from 1931 to 1947. After the Second World War, Ceylon gained independence from the United Kingdom in 1948, with DS Senanayake being the first prime minister and founding father.

=== Post-independence ===
Ceylon continued to be a Dominion of the British empire until 1972, when it became the Republic of Sri Lanka. The country continues to be part of the Commonwealth of Nations.

President Maithripala Sirisena made an official visit to the United Kingdom in 2015 and met Prime Minister David Cameron and Queen Elizabeth II. In 2018, Prime Minister Ranil Wickramasinghe made an official visit to meet the then British Prime Minister, Theresa May.

== Timeline of Sri Lanka-United Kingdom relations ==
=== Ancient ===
- 41–54 CE – Roman tax collector Annius Plocamus facilitates direct trade and first contact between Sri Lanka and the Roman Empire.
- 54–640 CE – Trade between the Roman Empire and Sri Lanka is common. Between 43–410 CE, Britain (mainly England and Wales) is part of the Roman Empire.
- 6th century–918 CE – The Anglo Saxon rulers of East Anglia engage in an international trading culture which stretches from the North Sea to the Baltic Sea and beyond. Many of the objects discovered at Sutton Hoo (a site dating back to Anglo-Saxon times) included garnets used in jewelry pieces which may have come from as far away as India and Sri Lanka.

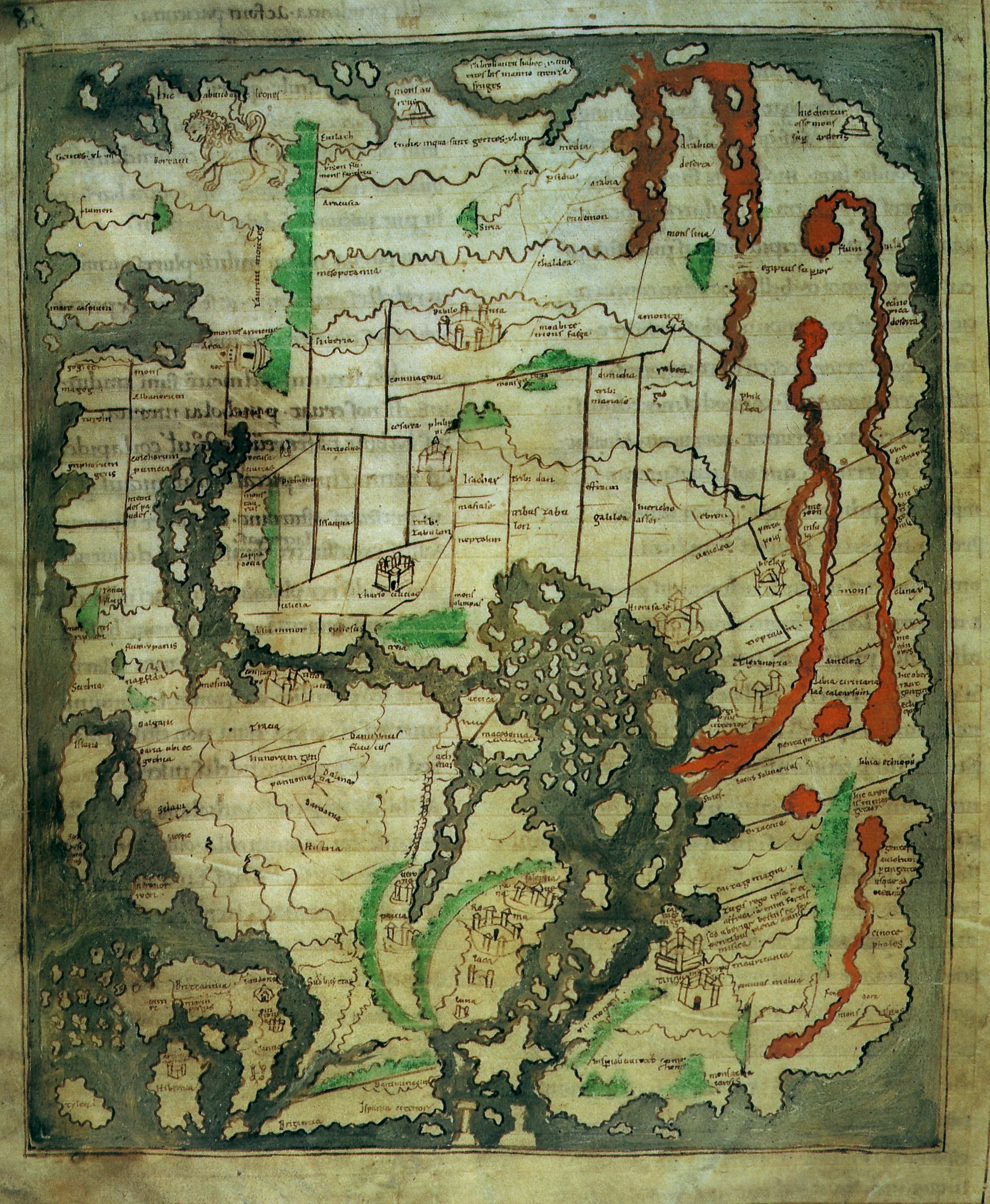
The Anglo-Saxon Cotton World Map (c. 1040). Britain is in the far west (bottom) while Sri Lanka is in the far east (top).

- c. 1040 – The Anglo-Saxon Cotton World Map shows westward as far as the British Isles and eastward as far as India and Taprobanen (the Anglo-Saxon name for Sri Lanka). At this time, Sri Lanka is the most distant land known to the Anglo-Saxons.
- 1300 – The Hereford Mappa Mundi is a medieval English world map created by Richard of Haldringham. This map names Sri Lanka as Taphana (sometimes instead claimed to be Sumatra).
- 1357 – In the book of The Travels of John Mandeville, Sri Lanka is mentioned under the name Taprobane, the old Greco-Roman name for the island. In his preface, Mandeville says he was a knight who was born and bred in St. Albans, England. Although the book is real (written in Anglo-Norman French), it is widely believed that "Sir John Mandeville" was not real, his travels never took place, and the book was possibly written by others, such as Jan de Langhe.

=== Early British contact ===
- 1589 –The first known English visitor to arrive to Sri Lanka (then Ceylon) is a gentleman merchant, Ralph Fitch. He arrived in Ceylon on 6 March 1589 and stayed for five days, before leaving. He arrives back in London in 1591.
- 1590s – English sailors and privateers cross to Ceylon, notably Sir James Lancaster
- 1658 – A British sea captain, Robert Knox, lands by chance in Ceylon after a storm on November 18, 1659, which suffered the ship's mast. He is taken captive by the Kingdom of Kandy under Rajasinghe II. Knox escapes in 1679, after nineteen years of captivity, and arrives back in London in 1680.
- 1667 – John Milton's epic poem Paradise Lost mentions the name of Taprobane
- 1681 – An Historical Relation of the Island Ceylon, a book written by Robert Knox after his experiences on Ceylon, is published in England. This book gives the British further knowledge about Ceylon.

=== British capture of Ceylon ===
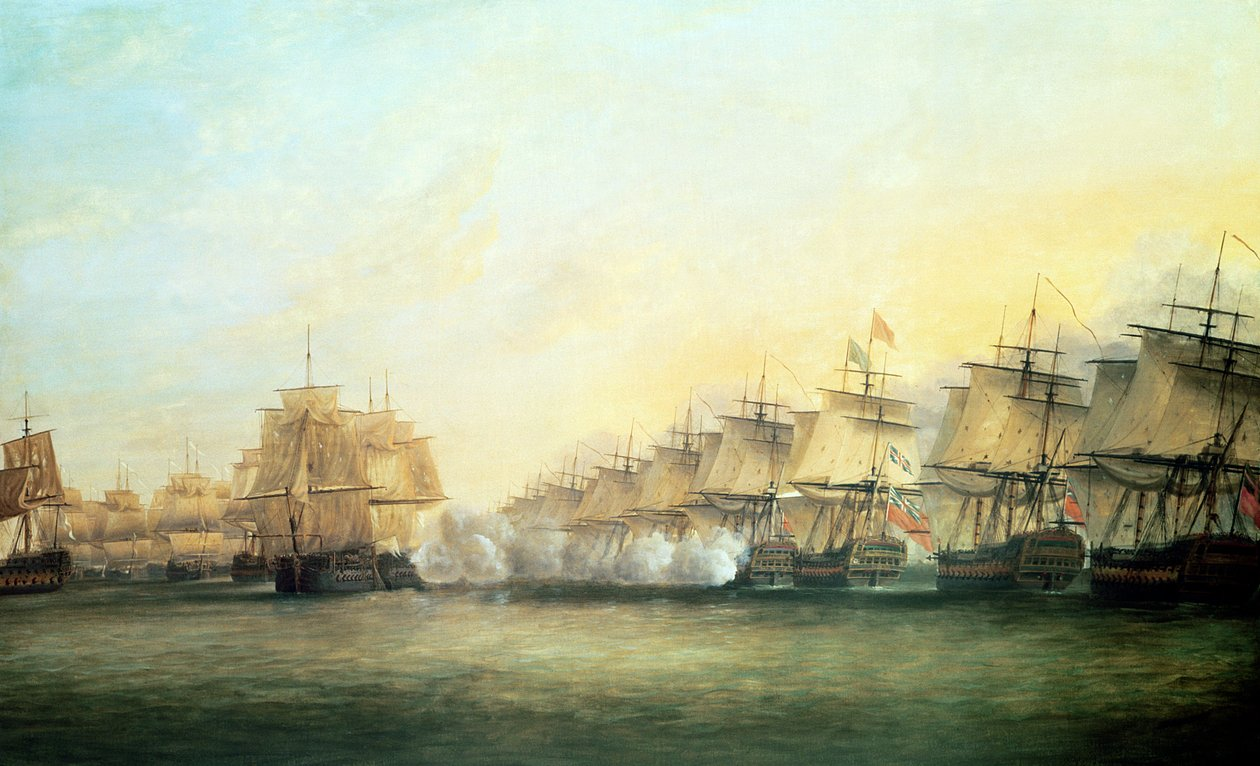
Battle of Trincomalee by Dominic Serres

- 1782 – The capture of Trincomalee during the Fourth Anglo-Dutch War. The Treaty of Paris (1784) restores Ceylon back to Dutch control.
- 1795–1796 – British forces invade and take control of Trincomalee and the areas of Dutch Ceylon.
- 1802 – The Treaty of Amiens formally cedes the Dutch areas of Ceylon to Britain.
- 1803–1805 – The British started to invade the Sinhalese ruled areas of the Kingdom of Kandy during the Kandyan Wars.
- 1805–1815 – Legal and social reforms are enacted to strengthen the British power, led by governors Thomas Maitland and Robert Brownrigg.
- February 1815 – The Second Kandyan War.
- March 1815 – The Kandyan Convention, which results in the imprisonment of the Kandyan king in India and the start of the British Ceylon period.

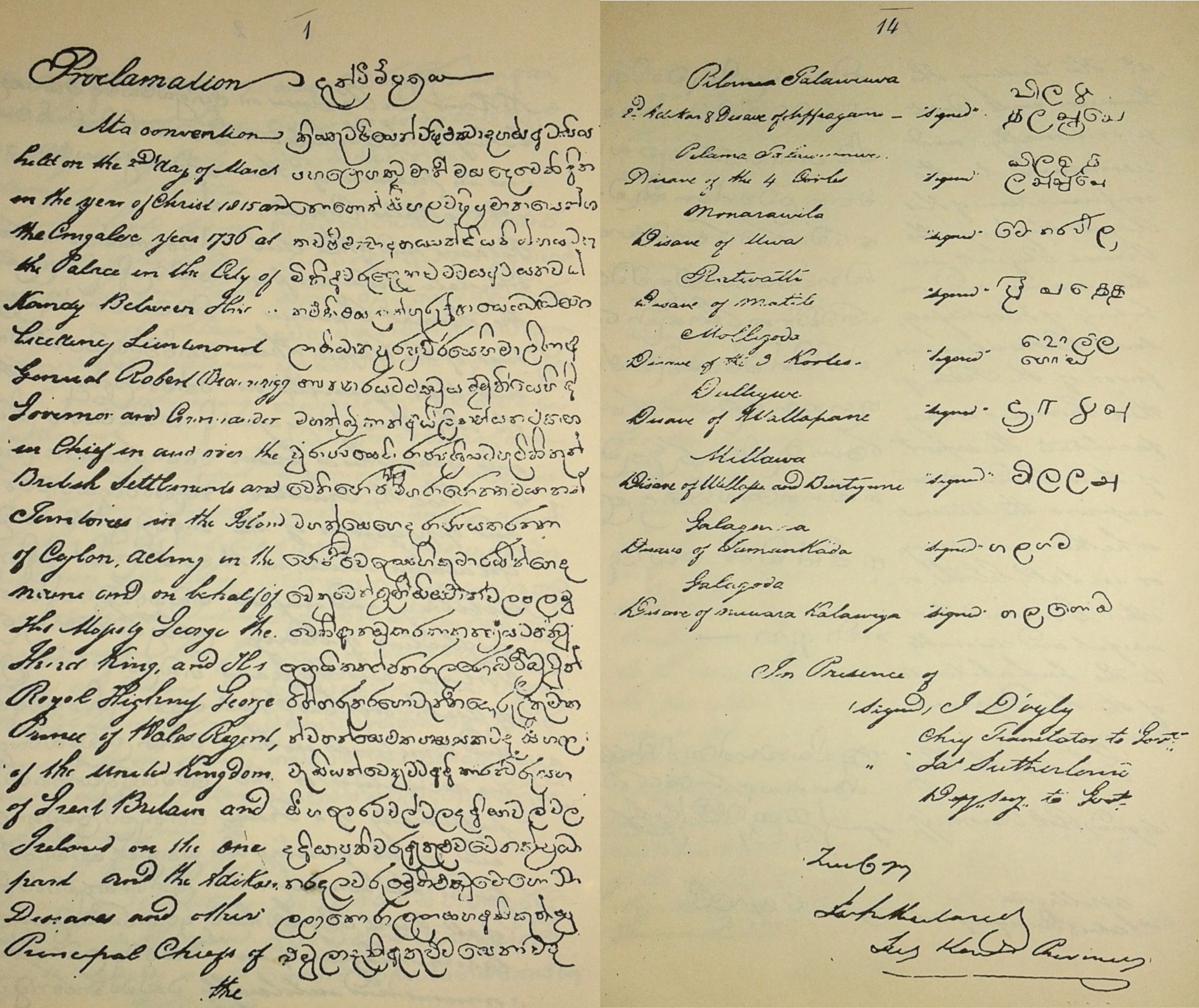
First (left) and final (right) pages of the Kandyan Convention

=== British rule ===
- 1815 – Start of the British Ceylon period. George III becomes the first British monarch to rule Ceylon.
- 1817–1818 – The Uva Rebellion, which ends with the complete annexation of the Kingdom of Kandy into British Ceylon.
- 1818 - Adam Sri Munni Ratna, a Buddhist monk from Sri Lanka, travelled to England with his cousin (also a Buddhist monk) while accompanying Sir Alexander Johnston in 1818. They were keen to learn Christianity as they were travelling to England. During their brief stay, the two monks were baptised and returned to Ceylon where they entered government service. This left a presence of Buddhism and Buddhists in the UK during the early 19th century. This year also began the start of missionary work by the Anglican Church.

== Diaspora ==
There were about 129,076 Sri Lankan-born residents in the United Kingdom according to the 2011 census. The majority of Sri Lankan immigrants in the United Kingdom live in London, with an estimated population of 84,000 in 2011.

There is also a community of European descent in Sri Lanka called the Burghers. These are people descended from the Portuguese, Dutch, English, and other Europeans during the colonial era of Ceylon.

== See also ==
- Foreign relations of Sri Lanka
- Foreign relations of the United Kingdom
