= Portugal–Sri Lanka relations =

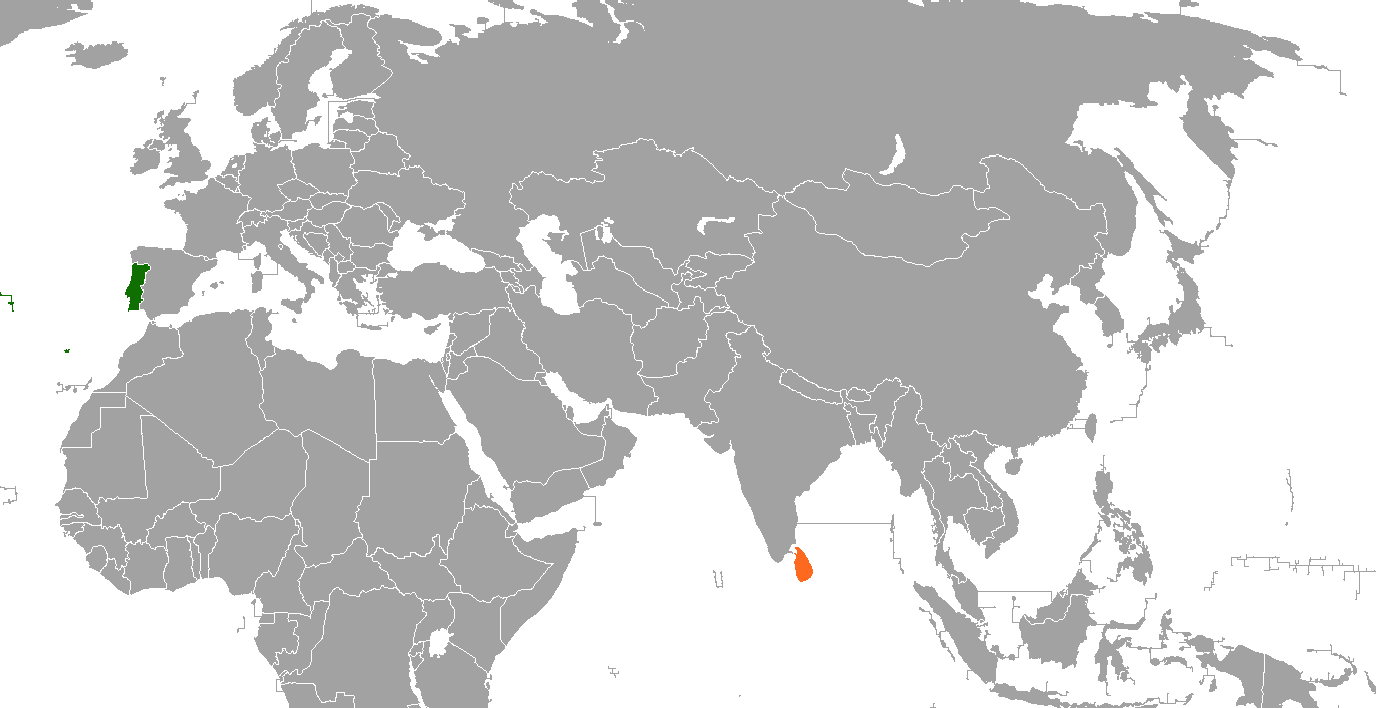

- Portugal: Sri Lanka

Portuguese–Sri Lankan relations refer to the bilateral relations between Portugal and Sri Lanka. While the two countries do not have embassies in each other's respective capitals, Portugal has an honorary consulate in Colombo. The countries share a long historical relationship.

== History ==
The Portuguese first arrived in Sri Lanka during the late 15th and early 16th century. The Sri Lankan Sinhalese of the Kingdom of Kotte would soon clash with the Portuguese, in which the Sri Lankans were defeated and incorporated into Portuguese territory. Later, the Sinhalese defeated the Portuguese in many battles and freed the central regions from Portuguese influence. The Portuguese only maintained control of the coastal regions and were convincingly defeated in more central kingdoms like Kandy and Seethawaka. The Portuguese rule- despite only lasting for a century- left an influential legacy in the country, such as the Portuguese naming of Sri Lankans, and the spread of The Catholic Church in the country. Many modern Sri Lankan names can be traced from the Portuguese, and Catholics formed at least 7 to 10% of Sri Lankan population.

=== Modern relations ===
Due to their long and historical ties, Sri Lanka and Portugal established relations following the British departure from Ceylon.

Portugal provided unofficial support to Sri Lanka in its war against the Liberation Tigers of Tamil Eelam, and provided entirely non-lethal supports throughout the Sri Lankan Civil War.

Since the 2010s, Sri Lanka and Portugal have increased bilateral relations as part of the re-introduction of Portuguese heritage in Sri Lanka.

In 2019, Portugal condemned the brutal terrorist bombings of Easter Christians, in which a Portuguese citizen was among the dead.

== Diplomatic missions ==
- Portugal is accredited to Sri Lanka from its embassy in Paris, France.
- Sri Lanka is accredited to Portugal from its embassy in New Delhi, India.

== See also ==
- Foreign relations of Portugal
- Foreign relations of Sri Lanka
- Burgher people
- Sri Lankan Portuguese creole
- Portuguese conquest of the Jaffna kingdom
