= Italy–Sri Lanka relations =

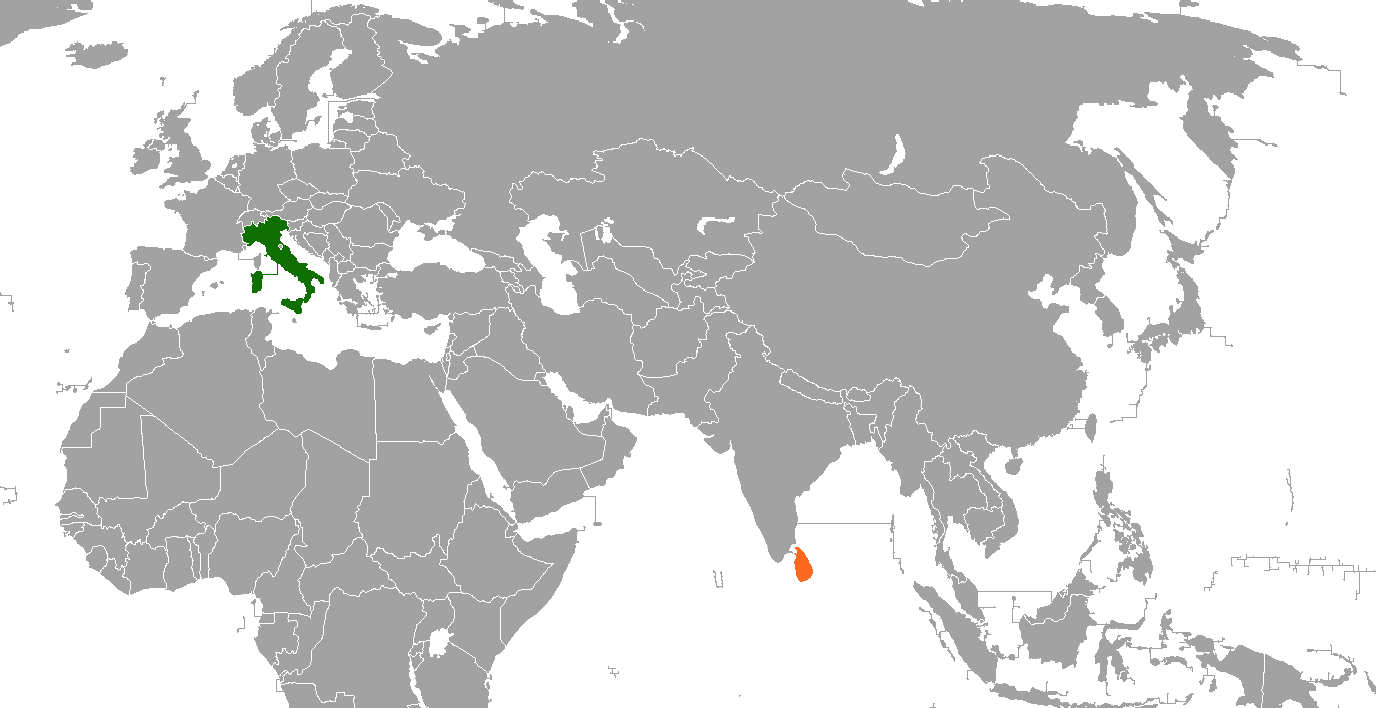

- Italy: Sri Lanka

Italy–Sri Lanka relations are the bilateral relations between Italy and Sri Lanka. Italy has an embassy in Colombo. Sri Lanka has an embassy in Rome.

== Economic relations ==
Italy is the fifth most important export market for Sri Lanka. In 2024, the value of Italian imported goods from Sri Lanka was 623 million euros.

== Diaspora ==
There are about 100,000 Sri Lankans in Italy, making them the second largest Sri Lankan community in Europe, while there are about 5,000 Italians in Sri Lanka, making them the largest European community in Sri Lanka.
