= Sri Lanka–Switzerland relations =

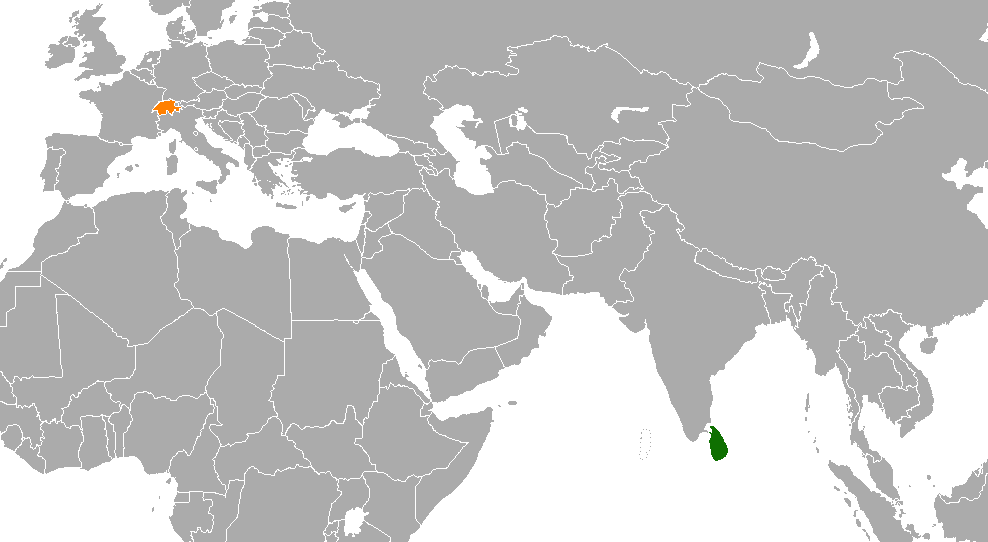

- Sri Lanka: Switzerland

Sri Lanka–Switzerland relations refers to the bilateral ties between the Democratic Socialist Republic of Sri Lanka and the Swiss Confederation, formally established in 1956. Switzerland maintains an embassy in Colombo. Since 2013, the two countries have engaged in regular political dialogue, and in 2018 they signed a migration agreement, which is the only such agreement Switzerland has with an Asian country.

Switzerland’s cooperation with Sri Lanka includes economic relations, vocational training, peacebuilding, development assistance, and cultural exchange. Between 2003 and 2016, it also provided humanitarian aid, particularly after the 2004 tsunami and the civil war from 2007 to 2009, when it increased its activities in the country.

== History ==
In 1948, Switzerland recognized Sri Lanka's independence, and in 1956, the two countries established diplomatic relations. The first Swiss ambassador to Colombo was appointed in 1968.

In 2021, Swissinfo reported that the UN Human Rights Council had passed a resolution expressing concern about the human rights situation in Sri Lanka following a report by UN High Commissioner for Human Rights Michelle Bachelet. The report highlighted a lack of accountability for wartime abuses and noted a deterioration in rights protections since the election of President Gotabaya Rajapaksa in 2019. Switzerland stated that Sri Lanka remained in a “state of denial of the past” and called for implementation of the report’s recommendations. It also encouraged the Council to take new steps in favour of victims and justice in Sri Lanka.

In April 2024, Sri Lanka and Switzerland held their fourth round of bilateral political consultations in Colombo. Discussions included ways to strengthen economic relations, with Switzerland assisting Sri Lanka’s Export Development Board in identifying new export markets. It was agreed that the fifth round of consultations would be held in Bern in 2026.

== See also ==
- Sri Lankans in Switzerland
- Foreign relations of Sri Lanka
- Foreign relations of Switzerland
- 2019 Sri Lankan Swiss embassy controversy
