= Nepal–Sri Lanka relations =

- Nepal: Sri Lanka

Nepal–Sri Lanka relations are the bilateral relations between the Federal Democratic Republic of Nepal and the Democratic Socialist Republic of Sri Lanka. They are both members of the Bay of Bengal Initiative for Multi-Sectoral Technical and Economic Cooperation (BIMSTEC) and South Asian Association for Regional Cooperation (SAARC).

Nepal–Sri Lanka relations were officially established on 1 July 1957.

A December 2023 agreement between the countries involved an air connection between Colombo and Lumbini and exchange programs in culture, tourism, and education. Collaboration in BIMSTEC and SAARC was also discussed and a memorandum of understanding signed. For this trip, Ali Sabry went to Kathmandu.
