= Pakistan–Sri Lanka relations =

- Pakistan: Sri Lanka

Diplomatic mission
- High Commission of Pakistan, Colombo: High Commission of Sri Lanka, Islamabad

Envoy
- High Commissioner Major General (R) Faheem-ul-Aziz: High Commissioner Rear Admiral Fred Senevirathne

Pakistan–Sri Lanka relations refer to the bilateral relations between Pakistan and Sri Lanka. Both countries are located in South Asia and are members of the Commonwealth of Nations, South Asian Association for Regional Cooperation and Non-Aligned Movement, and are also former British colonies. Pakistan also supported Sri Lanka's government against the Liberation Tigers of Tamil Eelam (LTTE) in the Sri Lankan civil war, providing military equipment, training, and intelligence to government forces, which eventually prevailed in the civil war.

In 2013, former Pakistani Prime Minister Nawaz Sharif said that there were strong bonds of friendship between the two countries. There is a Pakistani High Commission in Colombo, and a Sri Lankan High Commission in Islamabad.

== History ==
The earliest proper diplomatic and trade contacts between Pakistan (previously the Dominion of Pakistan) and Sri Lanka (previously the Dominion of Ceylon) date back as early as 1948.

The relations between Pakistan and Sri Lanka date back to the formative years of the two countries. The two countries laid the foundation of their friendship in 1948 when Prime Minister of Sri Lanka DS Senanayake visited Pakistan.

In 2009, shortly after the defeat of the Tamil Tiger rebels in Sri Lanka, Islamabad congratulated Sri Lanka and the Deputy Minister of Foreign Affairs Hussein A. Bhaila of Sri Lanka called Pakistan a true friend saying:

"The government and the people of Sri Lanka have considered Pakistan as a true friend of Sri Lanka, which has always stood by it in times of need..."

In April, 2015 Sri Lanka signed a nuclear energy deal with Pakistan.

Sri Lanka avoided joining the boycott of the 19th SAARC summit that was scheduled to be held in November 2016 in Islamabad, Pakistan. However, a media release by the Sri Lankan Ministry of Foreign Affairs stating it regrets that the prevailing environment in the region was not conducive for holding the SAARC summit was falsely interpreted by Indian media as not attending the summit. But the Sri Lankan Minister of Foreign Affairs Mangala Samaraweera debunked the claims saying that General Provisions of the Charter of SAARC results in the summit being cancelled even if one country does not attend thus there was no summit for Sri Lanka to attend and Sri Lanka will attend the summit whenever it will be held.

== Economic relations ==
On February 12, 2012, a credit line for US$200 million was one of three memoranda of understanding (MoU) signed between Pakistan and Sri Lanka. The MoUs were signed during President Mahinda Rajapaksa’s official visit to Pakistan, on the invitation of President Asif Ali Zardari.

In 2012, SriLankan Airlines invited Pakistan International Airlines to operate more flights to Sri Lanka.

=== Trade and investment ===
| | 2010 | 2011 | 2012 | 2013 | 2014 | 2015 | 2016 | 2017 | 2018 | 2019 | 2020 | 2021 | 2022 | 2023 | 2024 |
|---|---|---|---|---|---|---|---|---|---|---|---|---|---|---|---|
| Pakistan Exports | $322 million | $442 million | $341 million | $411 million | $306 million | $332 million | $304 million | $378 million | $355 million | $323 million | $346 million | $436 million | $410 million | $326 million | $453 million |
| Sri Lanka Exports | $59.4 million | $70.7 million | $95.3 million | $74.3 million | $74.8 million | $77.7 million | $66.3 million | $109 million | $105 million | $61 million | $88.2 million | $102 million | $96.7 million | $148 million | $80.3 million |
| Total trade | $381.4 million | $512.7 million | $436.3 million | $485.3 million | $380.8 million | $409.7 million | $370.3 million | $487 million | $460 million | $384 million | $434.2 million | $538 million | $506.7 million | $474 million | $533.3 million |
| Note: All values are in U.S. dollars. Source: OEC. | | | | | | | | | | | | | | | |

== Defense Cooperation ==
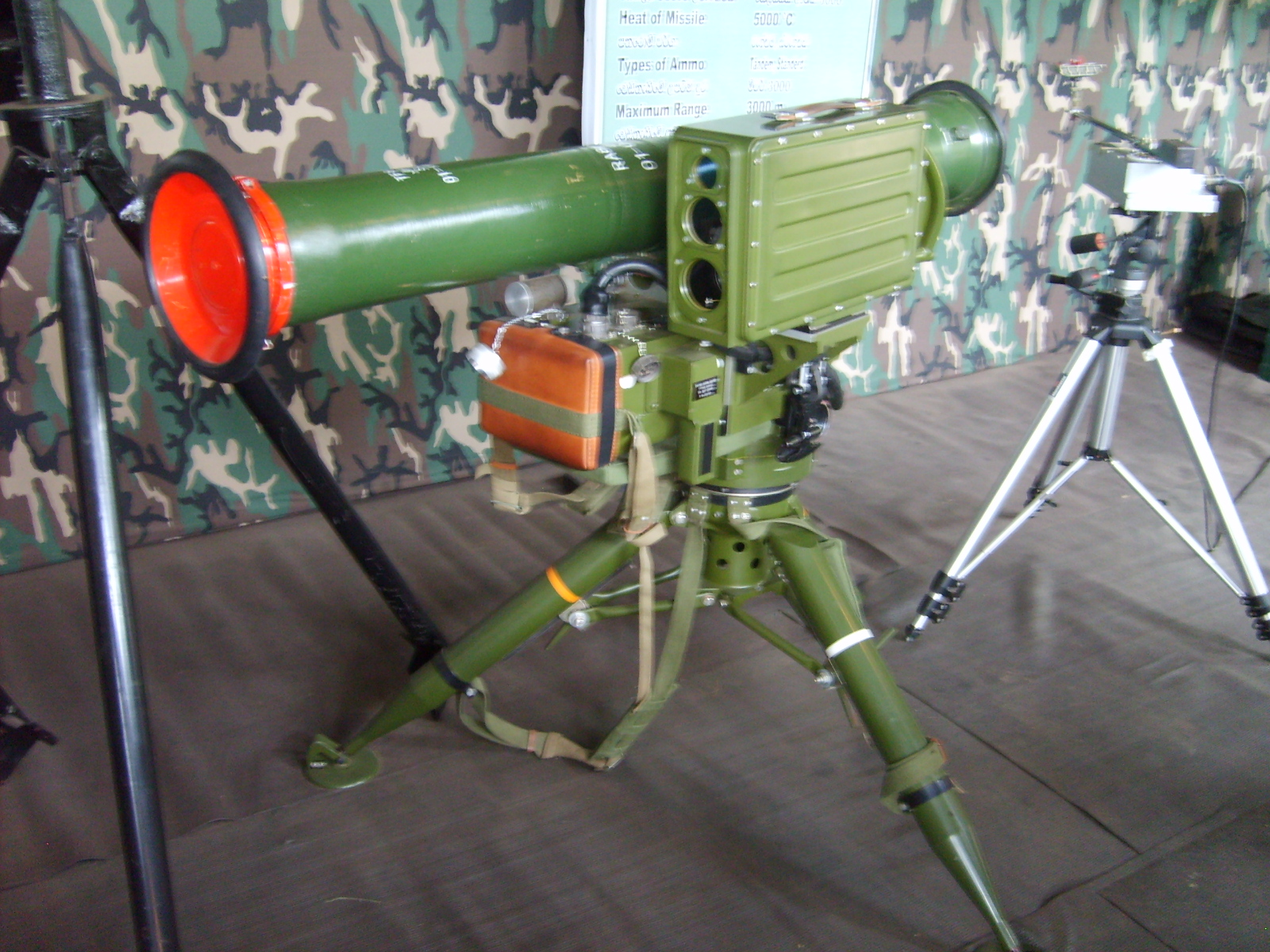
Baktar-Shikan Anti tank missile of Sri Lanka Army

On January 16, 2018, Pakistani Army Chief, General Qamar Javed Bajwa reached Sri Lanka on a two-day official visit on the invitation from his counterpart.

During his visit to Sri Lanka in February 2021, PM Imran Khan offered a $50 million line of credit to Sri Lanka for defence purchases.

=== Military assistance and training ===
Pakistan has provided training to the Sri Lankan military, included Sri Lankan former President Gotabaya Rajapaksa, and also military exercises. Pakistan offered training to Sri Lanka for intelligence gathering. Apart from traditional military assistance to Sri Lanka, Pakistan has also offered to train Sri Lanka Police and State Intelligence Service (SIS) officers.

Pakistan over the years has provided military munitions and systems to assist Sri Lanka in its Civil War with the LTTE.

== Agriculture ==
In January 2018, amid a shortage of fertilizer in Sri Lanka, President of Sri Lanka Maithripala Sirisena requested Pakistan for assistance. Though the Pakistani government had banned fertilizer exports, Pakistan agreed to send 41,000 metric tons of fertilizer immediately. Following concerns raised about the scarcity of fertilizer in Sri Lanka, the president of Sri Lanka had contacted Prime Minister of Pakistan Shahid Khaqan Abbasi requesting assistance to find a long-lasting solution to the crisis. Islamabad informed him that it would take steps to export more than 75,000 metric tons of fertilizer to Colombo in the future. Later, President of Sri Lanka Maithripala Sirisena expressed his gratitude towards the prime minister of Pakistan Shahid Khaqan Abbasi and the Government of Pakistan for timely provision of fertilizer to Sri Lanka to curb the shortage.

Pakistan is to establish a modern dairy farm in Polonnaruwa District in North Central Sri Lanka which is the home district of the former Sri Lankan President Maithripala Sirisena. According to the Food and Agriculture Organization (FAO) Pakistan is among three countries in the Asia and Pacific region which are the world's top dairy producers. A high level Pakistani dairy experts team will be visiting Polonnaruwa District to carry out a feasibility study.

== Culture ==
In June 2011, Pakistan presented the Government of Sri Lanka with a number of Buddhist relics from Pakistan's past. A former Pakistan High Commissioner, Seema Ilahi Baloch, also sponsored the construction of a school in Gampala District.

== Education ==
Pakistan has offered scholarships to Sri Lankan students to pursue the subjects of medicine, dentistry, pharmacy and engineering. The scholarships are granted under the Pakistan Technical Assistance Programme (PTAP).

== Health ==
In 2011, the Government of Sri Lanka gave medicines and staff to Punjab. A group of 12 doctors from Sri Lanka came to Lahore to assist. Pakistan thanked Sri Lanka for its assistance in containing an outbreak of dengue fever in the country last year.

== Sports ==
In October 2017, the Sri Lanka Cricket Team, after the Zimbabwe Cricket Team in 2015, became the second international team to arrive in Pakistan after the terrorist attack in 2009

== See also ==
- High Commission of Sri Lanka in Islamabad
- Foreign relations of Pakistan
- Foreign relations of Sri Lanka
