= Japan–Sri Lanka relations =

- Japan: Sri Lanka

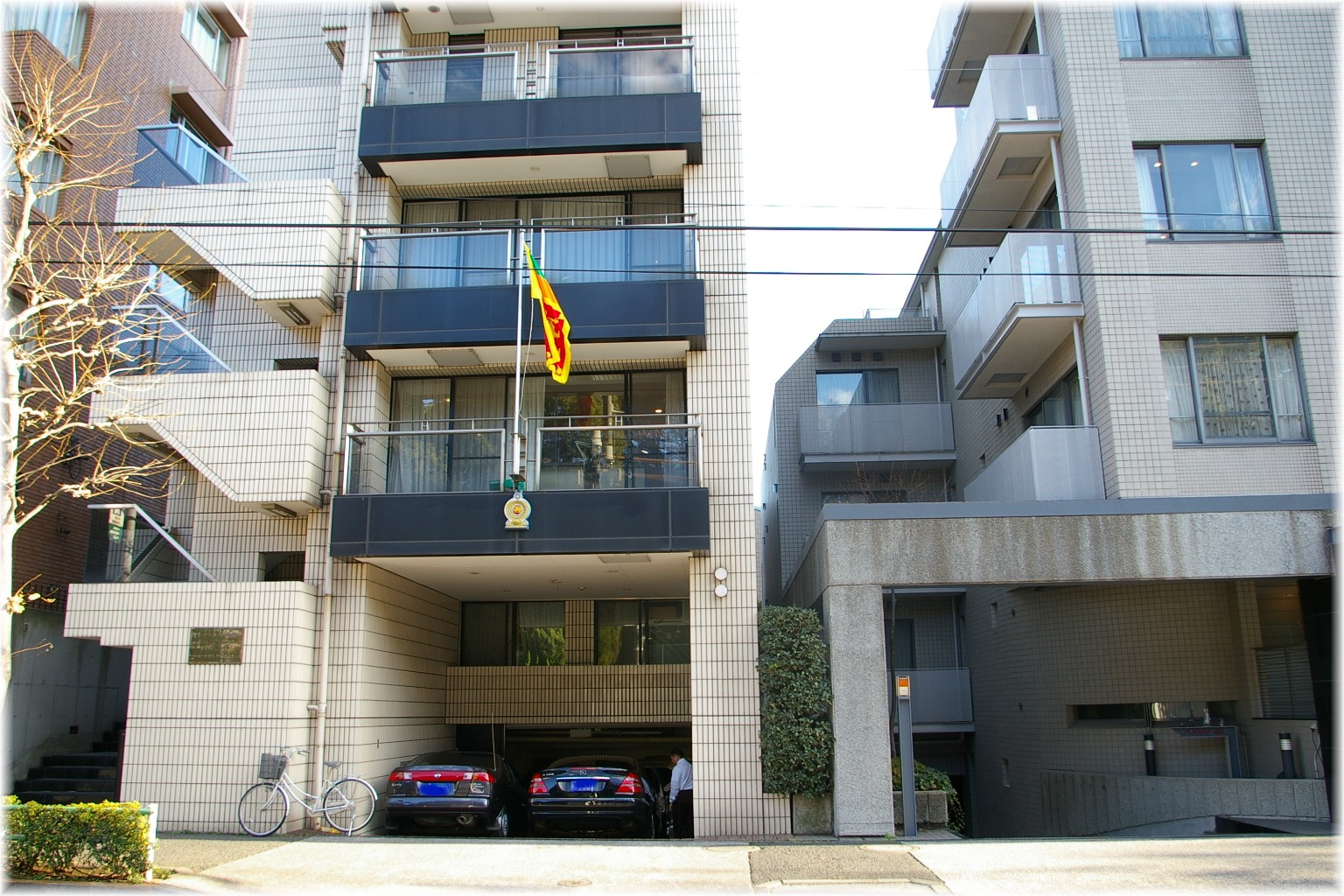
Embassy of Sri Lanka, Tokyo

Japan–Sri Lanka relations (Japanese: 日本とスリランカの関係 Nihon to Suriranka no Kankei, Sinhala: ජපාන-ශ්‍රී ලංකා සබඳතා Japana-Shri Lanka Sabandatha, Tamil: ஜபன்-இலங்கை உறவுகள்) refers to the bilateral relations between the Sri Lanka and Japan.

== Historical relations ==
The Easter Sunday Raid was the air raid carried out by Japan on Easter Sunday (5 April) 1942 on Colombo; a few days later Trincomalee was also attacked. These were undertaken as a part of commerce raiding and the harassment of the British Eastern Fleet in the Indian Ocean. Increasing resentment amongst the Sinhalese towards the Europeans led to more defections and popular support growing for a German or Japanese victory. Two young members of the Governing Party, Junius Richard Jayawardene (who later became president) and Dudley Senanayake (later the 3rd Prime Minister), held discussions with the Japanese with a view to collaboration to oust the British. Jayawardene later played a major role in re-admitting Japan to the world community at the San Francisco Conference (see Treaty of San Francisco#Sri Lanka's defence of Japan).

Diplomatic relations with Japan were established in 1952, four years after Sri Lanka gained independence from the United Kingdom.

According to a 2005 BBC World Service Poll, 50% of Sri Lankans viewed Japan's influence positively, with 4% expressing a negative view. Japan was involved in various development projects in Sri Lanka and is a major source of low interest concessionary loans for Sri Lanka.

In 2012, the 60th anniversary was celebrated with the issuance of a commemorative coin.

== Economic relations ==
In 1997, Sri Lanka became a member of the Bay of Bengal Initiative for Multi-Sectoral Technical and Economic Cooperation which also includes Bhutan, India, Nepal, Thailand and Myanmar. BIMSTEC wa looking into a free trade agreement with Japan to boost trade, which has been declining since 2000. By 2007, only 2.4% of Sri Lanka's total exports were to Japan, mostly tea, rubber, fish and precious stones. Sri Lanka became an aid recipient from Japan from the 1950s. Since then trade and investment linkages between the two countries developed and Japan was the largest aid donor to Sri Lanka until 2007, and was a major contributor to Sri Lanka's infrastructure development.

=== Infrastructure development and Technical assistance ===
In 2015, Japan mostly supported Sri Lanka through its major foreign aid institutions JICA and JBIC who were engaged in various development projects in Sri Lanka and has funded and aided various development projects such as establishment of Sri Jayawardanapura General Hospital, developing power generation through projects such as Upper Kotmale Hydro Electric Project, parts of Mahaweli Development, Samanalaweva, Kukuleganga Projects as well as the Kelanitissa Power Station, and developing transmission lines and improving the efficiency of the national grid reducing transmission losses, expansion and modernization of the Bandaranaike International Airport, developing urban transport infrastructure, telecom network expansion and the railway and road development projects including major expressway projects as well as the development and expansion of Colombo Port. Japan also provided assistance for a master plan for the city of Kandy. Japan gifted the Sri Jayawardenapura General Hospital, Peradeniya Teaching Hospital, Laboratory Complex of the Medical Research Institute, Institute of Computer Technology at the University of Colombo, Airport Quarantine Centre and Rupavahini Corporation .

=== Sri Lankan debt restructuring ===
Sri Lanka and Japan signed a debt restructuring agreement in March 2025, completing two years of negotiations. The $2.5 billion debt restructuring deal is part of Sri Lanka's broader recovery efforts, including a $2.9 billion bailout from the International Monetary Fund. This deal, aimed at alleviating Sri Lanka's financial crisis, allows both countries to resume projects, such as expanding Sri Lanka's main airport, which had been suspended after Sri Lanka defaulted on foreign debt in April 2022.

== Military relations ==
In 2015, Japan and Sri Lanka started to develop defense relations with Japan planning to give the Sri Lankan navy patrol ships to boost maritime security. Sri Lanka and Japan also maintained direct military to military ties and held joint military exercises.

The Japan Embassy stated that during a visit, Nakane woulf call on Prime Minister Ranil Wickremesinghe and hold meetings with other Sri Lankan government leaders to further promote bilateral relations between the two countries. The Embassy said the two patrol vessels would be handed over to the Sri Lanka Coast Guard on August 29, 2018 at the Colombo Port and would be utilized to improve maritime safety and strengthen control of the maritime borders of Sri Lanka.

== Cultural relations ==
Japanese television dramas have enjoyed popularity in Sri Lanka in the past. Most notable being, Oshin which was broadcast in Sri Lanka in 1987 and resonated with many viewers during its airing; Suzuran was another drama that enjoyed much popularity in the country. Similarly, Anime has enjoyed popularity since it began airing in the country in the late 1980s. More recently, WakuWaku Japan, a Japanese entertainment channel aimed at viewers in other Asian countries, began broadcasting in Sri Lanka on October 7, 2016.

A successful Sri Lankan tourism campaign in Japan led to predictions in November 2010 that 100,000 Japanese tourists would enter Sri Lanka in 2011.

== State visits ==
- Prime Minister Sir John Kotalawela visited Japan in 1954 and has been honoured with the Order of the Rising Sun, First Class.
- Prince Mikasa came to Ceylon in 1956 to attend the Buddha Jayanthi Celebrations.
- Prime Minister Kishi Shinsuke visited Ceylon in 1957.
- Prime Minister Dudley Senanayake in 1967
- M. D. H. Jayawardena was decorated with the Order of the Sacred Lotus by the Emperor of Japan in the 1970s
- Prime Minister Sirimavo Bandaranaike undertook a State Visit to Japan in 1976.
- President J.R Jayewardene visited Japan in 1979.
- Crown Prince Akihito and Crown Princess visited Sri Lanka in 1981 on behalf of Emperor Hirohitho.
- Prime Minister R. Premadasa went to Japan twice in 1980 and 1985
- Foreign Minister of Japan Kuranari Tadashi arrived in Sri Lanka in 1987
- President J. R. Jayewardene in 1989 visited Japan for Emperor Hirohito's funeral.
- Prime Minister Toshiki Kaifu Of Japan visited Sri Lanka in 1990.
- Prince and Princess Akishino visited Sri Lanka in November 1992.
- President Chandrika Bandaranaike Kumaratunga visited Japan in 1996
- In 2013 President Mahinda Rajapaksa completed a four-day visit to Japan. During the visit, President Rajapaksa met Prime Minister Shinzō Abe and had an audience with the Emperor and Empress of Japan at the Imperial Palace.
- In August 2013, Princess Tsuguko of Takamado visited Sri Lanka at the invitation of President Mahinda Rajapaksa.
- Prime Minister Shinzō Abe came to Sri Lanka for a two-day state visit in 2014 September 7.
- In 2015 October Prime Minister Ranil Wickremasinghe visited Japan. During the visit, Wickremasinghe met Japanese Prime Minister Shinzō Abe and had an audience with the Emperor and Empress of Japan at the Imperial Palace. Mr. Wickremasinge also addressed the Japanese Parliament, becoming only the third world leader to do so, after US President Barack Obama and Indian PM Narendra Modi.
- Dr. Hiroto Izumi, Special Advisor to the Prime Minister of Japan, visited Sri Lanka between October 8–16, 2016
- Speaker Karu Jayasuriya lead a Parliamentary delegation to Japan and was awarded with the Grand Cordon of the Order of the Rising Sun in 2016.
- Minister for Foreign Affairs Taro Kono visited Sri Lanka from 4–6 January 2018.
- State Minister for Foreign Affairs of Japan, Kazuyuki Nakane visited Sri Lanka from August 28–30, 2018 to participate in the commissioning ceremony of the patrol vessels donated from Japan to Sri Lanka.
- On 28 September 2022, on the occasion of the state funeral for Shinzo Abe, Japan's former prime minister, in Tokyo, Sri Lanka's president Ranil Wickremesinghe was one of only seven heads of state which met with Japanese Emperor Naruhito.

== Embassies ==
Japan has an embassy in Colombo.

Sri Lanka has an embassy in Tokyo.

== See also ==
- Foreign relations of Japan
- Foreign relations of Sri Lanka
- Japanese people in Sri Lanka
