= Bangladesh–Sri Lanka relations =

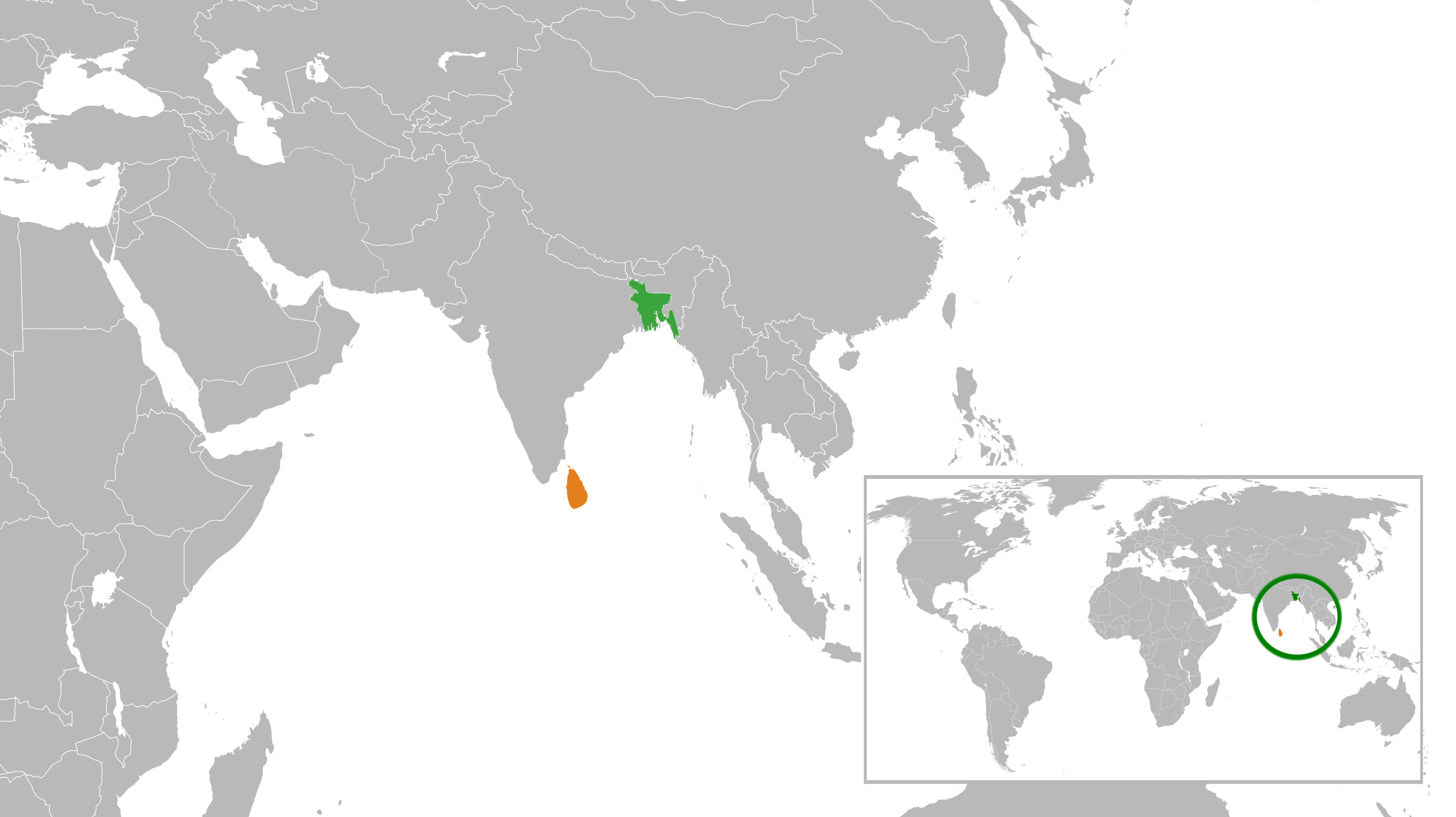

- Bangladesh: Sri Lanka

Bangladesh–Sri Lanka relations refer to the bilateral relations between Bangladesh and Sri Lanka. Relations have been generally friendly due to trade and investments. Bangladesh hosts a number of Sri Lankan students.

== History ==
The two South Asian nations have been historically tied since before the sub-continent's colonisation by the British. Sri Lanka's first King, to be mentioned in the ancient Pali chronicles, was alleged to have ancestors from the Vanga Kingdom located in modern Bangladesh. In Sri Lanka, several strands of hair gifted by the Buddhists of Bangladesh, identified as originated from Buddha, are venerated on Poya Day, a Buddhist public holiday in Sri Lanka.

During the Bangladesh Liberation War, Sri Lanka saw the partition of Pakistan as an example for themselves and feared India might use its enhanced power against them in the future. Despite the left wing government of Sirimavo Bandaranaike following a neutral non-aligned foreign policy, Sri Lanka assisted Pakistan in the war. As Pakistani aircraft could not fly over Indian territory, they took a longer route around India and stopped at Bandaranaike Airport in Katunayake where they were refuelled before flying to East Pakistan.

In August 2008, both Heads of States discussed the implementation of new air links in hope of increasing trade, investment and stronger cultural links. Sri Lanka's current investments have been in Bangladesh's garment and banking sector and expect to diversify into different areas. Bangladesh also hosts a number of Sri Lankan medical students and cricket as a form of friendly communications between their people.

In 2015, Sri Lanka donated 30 ‘Samadhi Buddha Statues’ to reconstructed and renovated temples after 2012 Ramu violence.

== Military ==
There has been discussion to increase bilateral relations, cooperation between the navies and sending Sri Lankan Naval personnel to study in Bangladesh. Bangladesh Navy ships has been visiting Sri Lanka for goodwill.

== Economy ==
The Bangladesh-Sri Lanka joint working group was formed in 2013 to increase trade. The two countries have agreed to sign a shipping agreement. In 2013, Bilateral trade between the two countries crossed the 100 million dollar mark.

In 2021, Bangladesh became a lender for first time in their history by agreeing to give Sri Lanka loans of at least $200 million from the foreign exchange reserves under a currency swap deal.

== See also ==
- Foreign relations of Bangladesh
- Foreign relations of Sri Lanka
- South Asian Association for Regional Cooperation (SAARC)
