= Sri Lanka–United States relations =

- Sri Lanka: United States

Sri Lanka and the United States established diplomatic relations on 23 October 1948.

== History ==
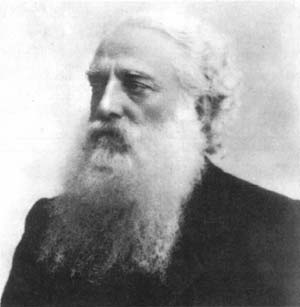
Henry Steele Olcott was a major revivalist of Buddhism in Sri Lanka and he is still honored in the nation for his efforts.

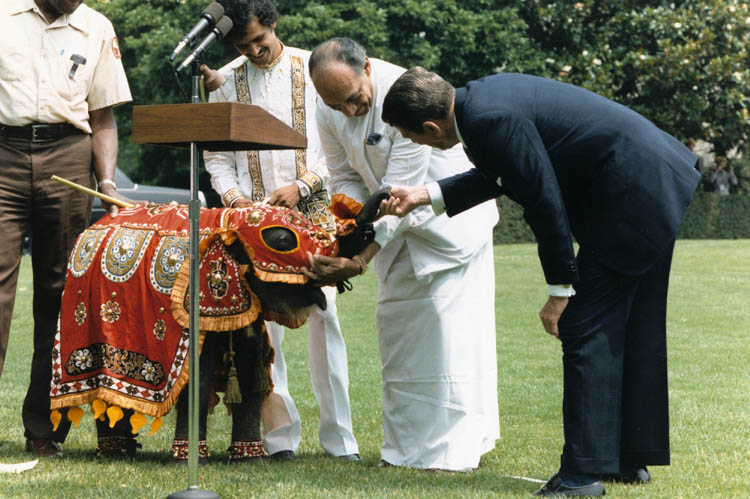
President Jayewardene of Sri Lanka presents a baby elephant to President Reagan and the American people in 1984. President Jayawardene was known for his pro-U.S. policies.

American people had been visiting the island since 1788, as spice traders and whalers. The American Mission was established in 1813 in Jaffna as part of the evangelising effort of the American Board of Commissioners for Foreign Mission.

Colonel Henry Steel Olcott was a pivotal American figure in the late 19th-century, known for helping with revival of Buddhism in Sri Lanka, alongside Helena Blavatsky and others. His endeavors included promoting Buddhist education, establishing schools, and advocating for the rights of Buddhists during colonial rule, laying the foundation for a lasting Buddhist revival movement. Even today, Olcott's contributions are revered in Sri Lanka, with figures like Samitha Seneviratne, Vice President of the Ananda College Old Boys Association, recognizing his significant impact on the nation's cultural heritage, religious landscape, and ethical values.

=== After independence since 1948 ===
U.S. assistance has totalled more than $2 billion since Sri Lanka's independence in 1948. Through the U.S. Agency for International Development (USAID), it has contributed to Sri Lanka's economic growth with projects designed to reduce unemployment, improve housing, develop the Colombo Stock Exchange, modernize the judicial system, and improve competitiveness. In addition, the International Broadcasting Bureau (IBB) operates a radio-transmitting station in Sri Lanka.

At the June 2003 Tokyo Donors' Conference on Sri Lanka, the United States pledged $54 million, including $40.4 million of USAID funding. Following the 2004 tsunami, the United States provided $135 million in relief and reconstruction assistance.

In 2004, Prime Minister Ranil Wickramasinghe was invited to the White House by President George W. Bush.

In early 2005, U.S. Secretary of State Colin Powell visited Sri Lanka in the aftermath of the 2004 Indian Ocean tsunami.

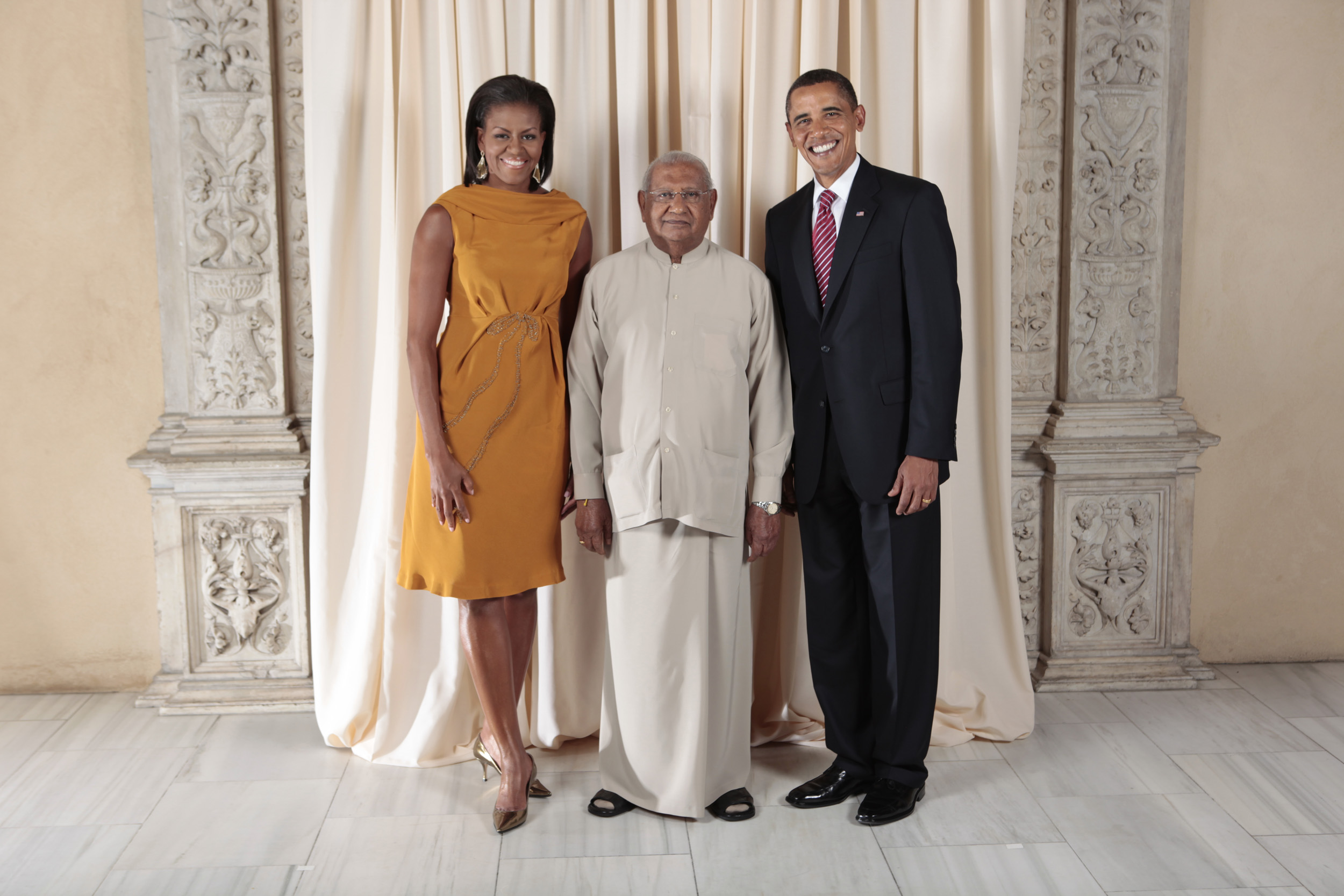
Ratnasiri Wickremanayake with President of the United States Barack Obama and Michelle Obama

In May 2015, U.S. Secretary of State John Kerry visited Sri Lanka for an official tour. Kerry said that the U.S. would send advisers who would provide "technical assistance" to the newly elected government of Maithripala Sirisena.

In December 2015, U.S. Counsellor of the State Department Thomas Shannon visited Sri Lanka. The first U.S.–Sri Lanka partnership dialogue to improve Governance, Development Cooperation and People-to-People ties; Economic Cooperation; Security Cooperation and International and Regional Affairs was announced. The U.S. offered assistance to help Sri Lanka become an economic and strategic hub in the Indian Ocean region.

In February 2020, the U.S. State Department banned Sri Lanka's Army Chief Shavendra Silva from entering the United States for alleged human rights violations during the final phase of the Sri Lankan Civil War. The Sri Lankan government opposed the sanctions, saying: "The Government of Sri Lanka takes strong objection to the imposition of travel restrictions on Lt. Gen. Silva and his immediate family members by the Government of the United States, based on independently unverified information".

On 27 October 2020, U.S. Secretary of State Mike Pompeo visited Sri Lanka as part of a tour through several Asian countries, which also included India, the Maldives, Indonesia and Vietnam. He denounced the Chinese Communist Party as a "predator" and said that the U.S. instead came as a "friend" after meeting with Sri Lankan President Gotabaya Rajapaksa and Foreign Minister Dinesh Gunawardena. Gunawardena stated: "Sri Lanka is a neutral, non-aligned country committed to peace, as I mentioned earlier. On that principles, we hope to continue with our relations with the United States and other countries."

== Defence relations ==
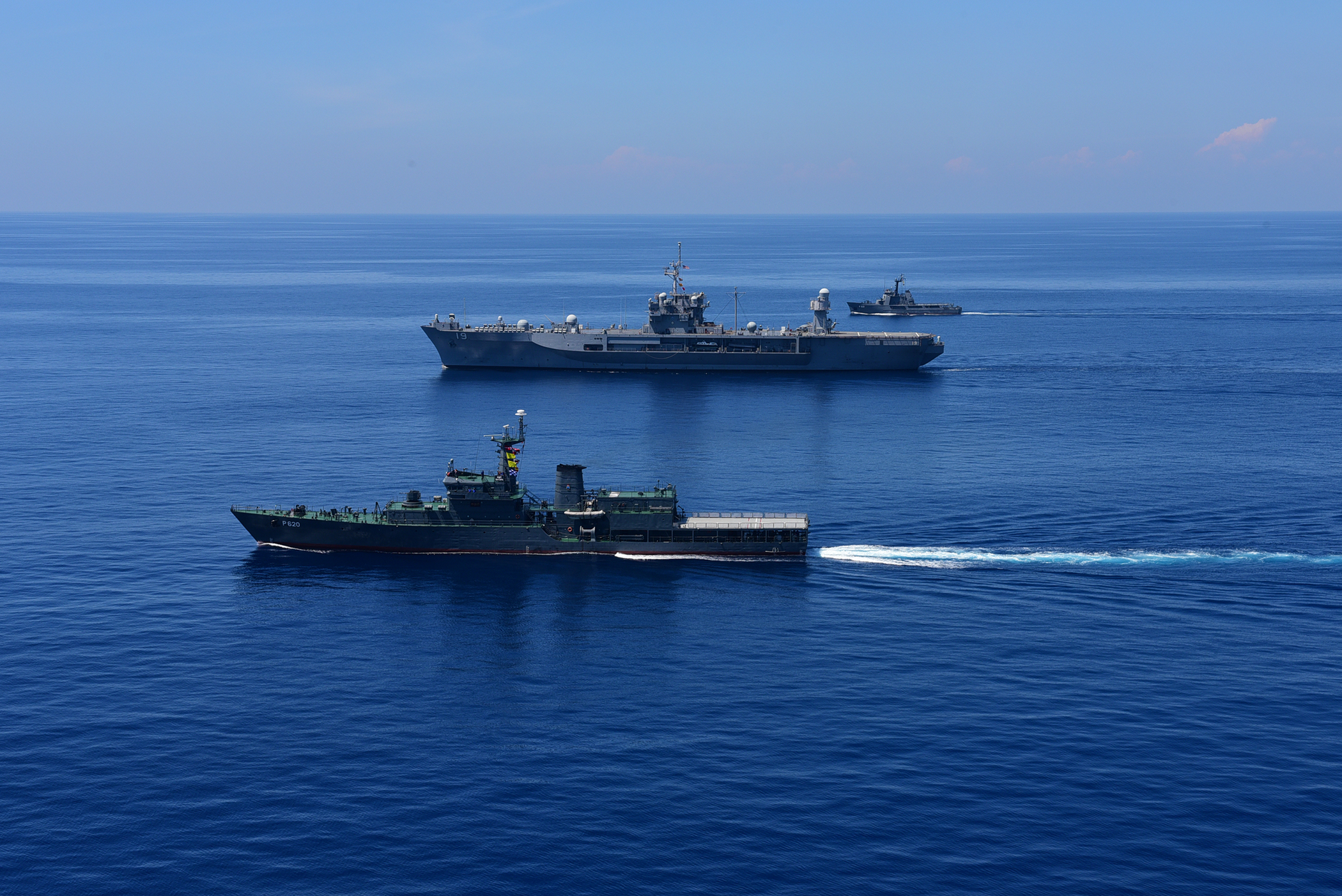
USS Blue Ridge (LCC-19) and Sri Lankan Navy SLNS Sayura and SLNS Samudura ships operate together

The U.S. Armed Forces maintain a limited military-to-military relationship with the Sri Lanka defense establishment. United States and Sri Lanka started to enhance defence relations beyond the sale of military equipment, and training facilities were extended when Sri Lanka was in an internal battle with a secessionist movement Tamil Tigers. During Ranil Wickremesinghe's time as prime minister in 2002, agreements were signed with the US which allowed Sri Lanka to get assistance in terms of military training, military technology, intelligence, special training in counter-terrorism, and direct monetary assistance for military development. During the ceasefire period, United States Pacific Command assessment team conducted a study from 12 September 2002 to 24 October 2002, which made several recommendations to strengthen the capabilities of the Sri Lanka Army, Sri Lanka Navy and Sri Lanka Air Force in case of the peace process failing. After studying the weakness of the military, the study recommended the use of cluster bombs (which weren't banned until 2010 when Cluster Munitions Convention came into effect) to destroy unarmoured area targets and arming Kfir's and Mi-24 gunships with guided weapons in case of fighting close to enemy forces. The US also donated the SLNS Samudura during this time. Sri Lanka also supported the US by permitting the use of its airspace and airports for flights associated under the Central Intelligence Agency (CIA) extraordinary rendition operations including the transportation of Riduan Isamuddin through Colombo.

It was reported that the US Navy Pacific Command provided intelligence to the Sri Lankan government during the civil war to hunt down LTTE crews and four ships. This was later confirmed by the former president Mahinda Rajapaksa whose government had poor relations with the United States.

== Public opinion ==
In a 2005 BBC World Service Poll, 30% of Sri Lankans view American influence positively, with 20% expressing a negative view. According to the 2012 U.S. Global Leadership Report, 14% of Sri Lankans approve of U.S. leadership, with 37% disapproving and 49% uncertain. According to a 2026 Pew Research Center survey, 42% of Sri Lankans had a favorable view of the United States, while 40% had a negative view.

== Embassies ==
Principal U.S. embassy officials include:

- Ambassador – Eric Meyer
- Deputy Chief of Mission –

== See also ==
- Sri Lankan Americans
- Foreign relations of Sri Lanka
- Foreign relations of the United States
- United States Ambassador to Sri Lanka
