= Electoral results for the district of Alexandra =

South Australian district election results

This is a list of election results for the electoral district of Alexandra in South Australian elections.

== Members for Alexandra ==
Four members (1902–1915)
Member	Party	Term	Member	Party	Term	Member	Party	Term	Member	Party	Term
William Blacker		1902–1906	Alexander McDonald	National League	1902–1910	George Ritchie		1902–1904	Charles Tucker	National League	1902–1906
William Blacker		1902–1906	Alexander McDonald	National League	1902–1910	George Ritchie	Farmers and Producers	1904–1910	Charles Tucker	National League	1902–1906
William Blacker	Liberal and Democratic	1906–1910	Alexander McDonald	National League	1902–1910	George Ritchie	Farmers and Producers	1904–1910	Percy Heggaton		1906–1910
William Blacker	Liberal Union	1910–1913	Alexander McDonald	Liberal Union	1910–1915	George Ritchie	Liberal Union	1910–1915	Percy Heggaton	Liberal Union	1910–1915
George Laffer	Liberal Union	1913–1915	Alexander McDonald	Liberal Union	1910–1915	George Ritchie	Liberal Union	1910–1915	Percy Heggaton	Liberal Union	1910–1915

Three members (1915–1938)
Member	Party	Term	Member	Party	Term	Member	Party	Term
George Laffer	Liberal Union	1915–1923	Archibald Peake	Liberal Union	1915–1920	George Ritchie	Liberal Union	1915–1922
George Laffer	Liberal Union	1915–1923	Herbert Hudd	Liberal Union	1920–1923	George Ritchie	Liberal Union	1915–1922
George Laffer	Liberal Federation	1923–1932	Herbert Hudd	Liberal Federation	1923–1932	Percy Heggaton	Liberal Federation	1923–1932
George Laffer	Liberal and Country	1932–1933	Herbert Hudd	Liberal and Country	1932–1938	Percy Heggaton	Liberal and Country	1932–1938
George Connor	Independent	1934–1941	Herbert Hudd	Liberal and Country	1932–1938	Percy Heggaton	Liberal and Country	1932–1938

Single member (1938–1993)
George Connor	Independent	1938–1941
Herbert Hudd	Liberal and Country	1941–1948
David Brookman	Liberal and Country	1948–1973
Ted Chapman	Liberal and Country	1973–1974
Ted Chapman	Liberal	1974–1992
Dean Brown	Liberal	1992–1993

== Election results ==
=== Elections in the 1990s ===
Alexandra state by-election, 9 May 1992
Party	Candidate	Votes	%	±%
Liberal	Dean Brown	9,662	47.9	−11.3
Independent	Ivar Schmidt	2,889	14.3	+14.3
Democrats	Anthony Dickson	2,484	12.3	−2.9
Labor	Johanna van der Velde	2,290	11.3	−13.3
Independent	Peter Charles	1,219	6.0	+6.0
Australian Independent Alliance	Roger Oates	998	4.9	+4.9
Australian Independent Alliance	Reg Macey	644	3.2	+3.2
Total formal votes		20,186	95.5	−2.4
Informal votes		943	4.5	+2.4
Turnout		21,129	88.4	−6.8
Two-candidate-preferred result
Liberal	Dean Brown	12,155	60.2	−5.8
Independent	Ivar Schmidt	8,031	39.8	+39.8
Liberal hold		Swing	N/A	

=== Elections in the 1980s ===
1989 South Australian state election: Alexandra
Party	Candidate	Votes	%	±%
Liberal	Ted Chapman	12,200	59.2	+3.2
Labor	Jacqueline Horton	5,286	25.6	−3.9
Democrats	Judith Logan	3,132	15.2	+8.4
Total formal votes		20,618	97.9	+3.0
Informal votes		437	2.1	−3.0
Turnout		21,055	95.2	+0.3
Two-party-preferred result
Liberal	Ted Chapman	13,599	66.0	+0.8
Labor	Jacqueline Horton	7,019	34.0	−0.8
Liberal hold		Swing	+0.8	

1985 South Australian state election: Alexandra
Party	Candidate	Votes	%	±%
Liberal	Ted Chapman	9,938	56.0	−10.0
Labor	John Quirke	5,241	29.5	+9.5
National	Rex Tilbrook	1,363	7.7	+2.7
Democrats	David Willson	1,215	6.8	−2.2
Total formal votes		17,757	94.9	
Informal votes		951	5.1	
Turnout		18,708	94.1	
Two-party-preferred result
Liberal	Ted Chapman	11,577	65.2	−9.8
Labor	John Quirke	6,180	34.8	+9.8
Liberal hold		Swing	−9.8	

1982 South Australian state election: Alexandra
Party	Candidate	Votes	%	±%
Liberal	Ted Chapman	10,519	57.8	−11.9
Labor	Helen McSkimming	4,235	23.3	+1.6
Democrats	Andrew Mills	2,158	11.9	+3.3
National	Rex Tilbrook	1,279	7.0	+7.0
Total formal votes		18,191	95.3	−1.5
Informal votes		906	4.7	+1.5
Turnout		19,097	94.6	+1.2
Two-party-preferred result
Liberal	Ted Chapman	12,557	69.0	−5.0
Labor	Helen McSkimming	5,634	31.0	+5.0
Liberal hold		Swing	−5.0	

=== Elections in the 1970s ===
1979 South Australian state election: Alexandra
Party	Candidate	Votes	%	±%
Liberal	Ted Chapman	11,584	69.7	+8.2
Labor	Helen McSkimming	3,614	21.7	−4.4
Democrats	Kaye Gibbs	1,434	8.6	−3.8
Total formal votes		16,632	96.8	−1.4
Informal votes		547	3.2	+1.4
Two-party-preferred result
Liberal	Ted Chapman	12,301	74.0	+6.3
Labor	Helen McSkimming	4,331	26.0	−6.3
Liberal hold		Swing	+6.3	

1977 South Australian state election: Alexandra
Party	Candidate	Votes	%	±%
Liberal	Ted Chapman	9,822	61.5	+8.6
Labor	Kenneth Jared	4,159	26.1	+6.7
Democrats	Kaye Gibbs	1,976	12.4	+12.4
Total formal votes		15,957	98.2	
Informal votes		298	1.8	
Turnout		16,255	93.8	
Two-party-preferred result
Liberal	Ted Chapman	11,134	69.8	−6.6
Labor	Kenneth Jared	4,823	30.2	+6.6
Liberal hold		Swing	−6.6	

1975 South Australian state election: Alexandra
Party	Candidate	Votes	%	±%
Liberal	Ted Chapman	6,270	52.6	+2.3
Liberal Movement	Donald Glazbrook	2,775	23.3	+23.3
Labor	Ruth Newell	2,447	20.5	+20.5
National	George Graham	435	3.6	−30.3
Total formal votes		11,927	97.6	+2.5
Informal votes		297	2.4	−2.5
Turnout		12,224	93.5	−2.0
Two-party-preferred result
Liberal	Ted Chapman	9,160	76.8	+6.9
Labor	Ruth Newell	2,767	23.2	+23.2
Liberal hold		Swing	N/A	

- The two candidate preferred vote was not counted between the Liberal and Liberal Movement candidates for Alexandra.

1973 South Australian state election: Alexandra
Party	Candidate	Votes	%	±%
Liberal and Country	Ted Chapman	5,229	50.3	−9.7
Country	Lester James	3,523	33.9	+33.9
Independent	David Baines	1,642	15.8	+15.8
Total formal votes		10,394	95.1	−3.7
Informal votes		536	4.9	+3.7
Turnout		10,930	95.5	+1.5
Two-candidate-preferred result
Liberal and Country	Ted Chapman	6,050	58.2	−9.8
Country	Lester James	4,344	41.8	+41.8
Liberal and Country hold		Swing	N/A	

1970 South Australian state election: Alexandra
Party	Candidate	Votes	%	±%
Liberal and Country	David Brookman	5,830	60.0	
Labor	Kenneth Jared	2,520	25.9	
Independent	Lester James	1,373	14.1	
Total formal votes		9,723	98.8	
Informal votes		116	1.2	
Turnout		9,839	97.0	
Two-party-preferred result
Liberal and Country	David Brookman	6,903	71.0	
Labor	Kenneth Jared	2,820	29.0	
Liberal and Country hold		Swing		

=== Elections in the 1960s ===
1968 South Australian state election: Alexandra
Party	Candidate	Votes	%	±%
Liberal and Country	David Brookman	6,349	48.7	−9.0
Labor	Robert Harris	5,910	45.3	+3.0
Independent	Betty Bishop	442	3.4	+3.4
National	William Johns	350	2.7	+2.7
Total formal votes		13,051	98.1	0.0
Informal votes		255	1.9	0.0
Turnout		13,306	95.9	+0.1
Two-party-preferred result
Liberal and Country	David Brookman	7,040	53.9	−3.8
Labor	Robert Harris	6,011	46.1	+3.8
Liberal and Country hold		Swing	−3.8	

1965 South Australian state election: Alexandra
Party	Candidate	Votes	%	±%
Liberal and Country	David Brookman	5,557	57.7	−1.1
Labor	Desmond Merton	4,068	42.3	+10.5
Total formal votes		9,625	98.1	−0.5
Informal votes		185	1.9	+0.5
Turnout		9,810	95.8	+0.1
Liberal and Country hold		Swing	−5.8	

1962 South Australian state election: Alexandra
Party	Candidate	Votes	%	±%
Liberal and Country	David Brookman	4,348	58.8	−41.2
Labor	Ralph Dettman	2,353	31.8	+31.8
Independent	Frank Halleday	698	9.4	+9.4
Total formal votes		7,399	98.6	
Informal votes		101	1.4	
Turnout		7,500	95.7	
Two-party-preferred result
Liberal and Country	David Brookman	4,697	63.5	−36.5
Labor	Ralph Dettman	2,702	36.5	+36.5
Liberal and Country hold		Swing	N/A	

=== Elections in the 1950s ===
1959 South Australian state election: Alexandra
Party	Candidate	Votes	%	±%
Liberal and Country	David Brookman	unopposed		
Liberal and Country hold		Swing		

1956 South Australian state election: Alexandra
Party	Candidate	Votes	%	±%
Liberal and Country	David Brookman	unopposed		
Liberal and Country hold		Swing		

1953 South Australian state election: Alexandra
Party	Candidate	Votes	%	±%
Liberal and Country	David Brookman	unopposed		
Liberal and Country hold		Swing		

1950 South Australian state election: Alexandra
Party	Candidate	Votes	%	±%
Liberal and Country	David Brookman	unopposed		
Liberal and Country hold		Swing		

=== Elections in the 1940s ===
1947 South Australian state election: Alexandra
Party	Candidate	Votes	%	±%
Liberal and Country	David Brookman	4,502	65.9	−34.1
Labor	Albert Taverner	1,442	21.1	+21.1
Independent	Ethel Wache	887	13.0	+13.0
Total formal votes		6,831	97.5	
Informal votes		173	2.5	
Turnout		7,004	95.1	
Liberal and Country hold		Swing	N/A	

- Preferences were not distributed.

1944 South Australian state election: Alexandra
Party	Candidate	Votes	%	±%
Liberal and Country	Herbert Hudd	unopposed		
Liberal and Country hold		Swing		

1941 South Australian state election: Alexandra
Party	Candidate	Votes	%	±%
Liberal and Country	Herbert Hudd	unopposed		
Liberal and Country hold		Swing		

=== Elections in the 1930s ===
1938 South Australian state election: Alexandra
Party	Candidate	Votes	%	±%
Independent	George Connor	2,085	50.4	
Liberal and Country	Herbert Hudd	2,056	49.6	
Total formal votes		4,141	98.6	
Informal votes		59	1.4	
Turnout		4,200	64.3	
Independent gain from Liberal and Country		Swing		
