= 2005 Tasmanian Legislative Council periodic election =

Legislative election in Tasmania, Australia

- 1 May 2005

3 of the 15 seats in the Legislative Council 8 seats needed for a majority
	First party	Second party
Party	Independent	Labor
Seats before	2	1
Seats won	2	1
Seat change	Steady	Steady

Periodic elections for the Tasmanian Legislative Council were held on 1 May 2005. The three seats up for election were Murchison, held by independent MLC Tony Fletcher; Paterson, held by independent MLC Don Wing; and Rumney, held by Labor MLC Lin Thorp. Paterson was last contested in 2000, while Murchison and Rumney were last contested in 1999.

== Murchison ==
Murchison had been held since its creation in 1999 by Tony Fletcher, who had previously served as the member for Russell (1981–1999). He decided to retire at this election.

=== Murchison Results ===
Tasmanian Legislative Council periodic elections, 2005: Murchison
Party	Candidate	Votes	%	±%
Independent	Ruth Forrest	5,955	28.96	N/A
Independent	Kevin Hyland	5,428	26.40	N/A
Independent	John Oldaker	4,367	21.24	N/A
Independent	Alwyn Bond	2,946	14.33	N/A
Greens	Scott Jordan	1,864	9.07	N/A
Total formal votes		20,560	96.46	+0.10
Informal votes		755	3.54	−0.10
Turnout		21,315	89.22	+1.08
Two-candidate-preferred result
Independent	Ruth Forrest	10,549	51.37	N/A
Independent	Kevin Hyland	9,986	48.63	N/A
Independent hold		Swing	N/A	

== Paterson ==
Long-serving MLC and Legislative Council President Don Wing had represented Paterson since its creation in 1999, and had previously been member for Launceston from 1982 to 1999. He was re-elected unopposed.

=== Paterson Results ===
Tasmanian Legislative Council periodic elections, 2005: Paterson
Party	Candidate	Votes	%	±%
Independent	Don Wing	unopposed		
Independent hold		Swing		

== Rumney ==
Rumney had been represented by Labor MLC Lin Thorp since its creation in 1999. Since she won a majority on the primary vote, no preference count was conducted.

=== Rumney Results ===
Tasmanian Legislative Council periodic elections, 2005: Rumney
Party	Candidate	Votes	%	±%
Labor	Lin Thorp	9,513	50.96	+5.25
Independent	Carmel Torenius	4,600	24.64	+24.64
Greens	Glenn Millar	2,286	12.25	+12.25
Independent	David Traynor	2,269	12.15	+12.15
Total formal votes		18,668	96.29	−0.35
Informal votes		720	3.71	+0.35
Turnout		19,388	85.85	−1.37
Labor hold		Swing	N/A	
