= Electoral results for the Division of Rumney =

This is a list of electoral results for the electoral division of Rumney in Tasmanian Legislative Council elections since 2005, when candidate political affiliations were first recorded in the official record.

== Members ==
| Member | Party | Period |
|---|---|---|
| Lin Thorp | Labor | 1999–2011 |
| Tony Mulder | Independent | 2011–2017 |
| Sarah Lovell | Labor | 2017–present |

== Election results ==
=== Elections in the 2020s ===
==== 2023 ====
2023 Tasmanian Legislative Council periodic elections: Rumney
| Party | Candidate | Votes | % | ±% |
|---|---|---|---|---|
| Labor | Sarah Lovell | 11,003 | 49.97 | +16.20 |
| Liberal | Gregory Brown | 5,838 | 26.51 | +26.51 |
| Independent | Tony Mulder | 3,760 | 17.08 | −9.77 |
| Shooters, Fishers, Farmers | Adrian Pickin | 1,417 | 6.44 | −0.70 |
| Total formal votes | | 22,018 | 96.81 | +0.71 |
| Informal votes | | 726 | 3.19 | −0.71 |
| Turnout | | 22,744 | 82.39 | |
| Registered electors | | 27,606 | | |
After distribution of preferences
| Labor | Sarah Lovell | 11,453 | 52.02 | −0.24 |
| Liberal | Gregory Brown | 6,221 | 28.25 | +28.25 |
| Independent | Tony Mulder | 4,344 | 19.73 | −8.01 |
| Labor hold | | | | |

=== Elections in the 2010s ===
==== 2017 ====
Tasmanian Legislative Council periodic elections, 2017: Rumney
| Party | Candidate | Votes | % | ±% |
|---|---|---|---|---|
| Labor | Sarah Lovell | 7,643 | 33.77 | +14.04 |
| Independent Liberal | Tony Mulder | 6,077 | 26.85 | −4.88 |
| Independent | Steve Mav | 4,179 | 18.46 | +18.46 |
| Independent | Shelley Shay | 1,839 | 8.12 | +8.12 |
| Shooters and Fishers | Cheryl Arnol | 1,616 | 7.14 | +7.14 |
| Independent | Debra Thurley | 1,281 | 5.66 | +5.66 |
| Total formal votes | | 22,635 | 96.10 | −0.54 |
| Informal votes | | 919 | 3.90 | +0.54 |
| Turnout | | 23,554 | 84.45 | −0.88 |
Two-candidate-preferred result
| Labor | Sarah Lovell | 11,626 | 52.26 | +5.41 |
| Independent Liberal | Tony Mulder | 10,622 | 47.74 | −5.41 |
| Labor gain from Independent Liberal | | Swing | +5.41 | |

==== 2011 ====
Tasmanian Legislative Council periodic elections, 2011: Rumney
| Party | Candidate | Votes | % | ±% |
|---|---|---|---|---|
| Labor | Lin Thorp | 6,754 | 32.77 | −18.18 |
| Independent | Tony Mulder | 5,839 | 28.33 | +28.33 |
| Independent | Paul Mason | 3,114 | 15.11 | +15.11 |
| Greens | Penelope Ann | 2,762 | 13.40 | +1.15 |
| Independent | Cate Clark | 1,356 | 6.58 | +6.58 |
| Independent | John Forster | 785 | 3.81 | +3.81 |
| Total formal votes | | 20,610 | 95.51 | −0.78 |
| Informal votes | | 968 | 4.49 | +0.78 |
| Turnout | | 21,578 | 85.33 | −0.49 |
Two-party-preferred result
| Independent | Tony Mulder | 10,785 | 53.15 | N/A |
| Labor | Lin Thorp | 9,507 | 46.85 | N/A |
| Independent gain from Labor | | Swing | N/A | |

=== Elections in the 2000s ===
==== 2005 ====
Tasmanian Legislative Council periodic elections, 2005: Rumney
| Party | Candidate | Votes | % | ±% |
|---|---|---|---|---|
| Labor | Lin Thorp | 9,513 | 50.96 | +5.25 |
| Independent | Carmel Torenius | 4,600 | 24.64 | +24.64 |
| Greens | Glenn Millar | 2,286 | 12.25 | +12.25 |
| Independent | David Traynor | 2,269 | 12.15 | +12.15 |
| Total formal votes | | 18,668 | 96.29 | −0.35 |
| Informal votes | | 720 | 3.71 | +0.35 |
| Turnout | | 19,388 | 85.85 | −1.37 |
| Labor hold | | Swing | N/A | |
