= 2023 Tasmanian Legislative Council periodic election =

Legislative election in Tasmania, Australia

- 6 May 2023

3 of the 15 seats on the Legislative Council 8 seats needed for a majority
	First party	Second party
Party	Independent	Labor
Seats before	2	1
Seats won	2	1
Seat change	Steady	Steady
- Results by electoral division

Periodic elections for the Tasmanian Legislative Council were held on 6 May 2023. Three seats were up for a regularly scheduled vote; Launceston, Murchison and Rumney.

All three incumbents were reelected.

== Launceston ==
The seat of Launceston, based in the inland Tasmanian city of Launceston, has been held by independent member Rosemary Armitage since 2011.

=== Launceston Results ===
2023 Tasmanian Legislative Council periodic elections: Launceston
Party	Candidate	Votes	%	±%
Independent	Rosemary Armitage	15,548	78.23	+43.24
Greens	Cecily Rosol	4,327	21.77	+14.45
Total formal votes		19,875	95.12	−1.23
Informal votes		1,020	4.88	+1.23
Turnout		20,895	82.39	−1.83
Registered electors		25,361		
Independent hold				

== Murchison ==
The west coast seat of Murchison has been held by independent member Ruth Forrest since 2005.

=== Murchison Results ===
2023 Tasmanian Legislative Council periodic elections: Murchison
Party	Candidate	Votes	%	±%
Independent	Ruth Forrest	16,542	71.88	+15.20
Shooters, Fishers, Farmers	Brenton Jones	3,098	13.46	+13.46
Independent	Codie Hutchison	2,508	10.90	+10.90
Independent	Gatty Burnett	865	3.76	+3.76
Total formal votes		23,013	96.09	−0.59
Informal votes		936	3.91	+0.59
Turnout		23,949	85.19	+0.79
Registered electors		28,114		
Independent hold				

== Rumney ==
The south-eastern seat of Rumney has been held by Labor's Sarah Lovell since 2017.

=== Rumney Results ===
2023 Tasmanian Legislative Council periodic elections: Rumney
Party	Candidate	Votes	%	±%
Labor	Sarah Lovell	11,003	49.97	+16.20
Liberal	Gregory Brown	5,838	26.51	+26.51
Independent	Tony Mulder	3,760	17.08	−9.77
Shooters, Fishers, Farmers	Adrian Pickin	1,417	6.44	−0.70
Total formal votes		22,018	96.81	+0.71
Informal votes		726	3.19	−0.71
Turnout		22,744	82.39	
Registered electors		27,606		
After distribution of preferences
Labor	Sarah Lovell	11,453	52.02	−0.24
Liberal	Gregory Brown	6,221	28.25	+28.25
Independent	Tony Mulder	4,344	19.73	−8.01
Labor hold				
