= Electoral results for the Division of Murchison =

This is a list of electoral results for the electoral division of Murchison in Tasmanian Legislative Council elections since 2005, when candidate political affiliations were first recorded in the official record.

== Members ==
The elected members for the seat of Murchison have all sat as independents, including those for the former seat of Russell.

Member	Party	Period
Tony Fletcher	Independent	1999–2005
Ruth Forrest	Independent	2005–present

== Election results ==
=== Elections in the 2020s ===
==== 2023 ====
2023 Tasmanian Legislative Council periodic elections: Murchison
Party	Candidate	Votes	%	±%
Independent	Ruth Forrest	16,542	71.88	+15.20
Shooters, Fishers, Farmers	Brenton Jones	3,098	13.46	+13.46
Independent	Codie Hutchison	2,508	10.90	+10.90
Independent	Getty Burnett	865	3.76	+3.76
Total formal votes		23,013	96.09	−0.59
Informal votes		936	3.91	+0.59
Turnout		23,949	85.19	+0.79
Registered electors		28,114		
Independent hold				

=== Elections in the 2010s ===
==== 2017 ====
Tasmanian Legislative Council periodic elections, 2017: Murchison
Party	Candidate	Votes	%	±%
Independent	Ruth Forrest	11,168	56.68	N/A
Independent	Daryl Quilliam	8,534	43.32	N/A
Total formal votes		19,702	96.68	N/A
Informal votes		676	3.32	N/A
Turnout		20,378	84.40	N/A
Independent hold		Swing	N/A	

==== 2011 ====
Tasmanian Legislative Council periodic elections, 2011: Murchison
Party	Candidate	Votes	%	±%
Independent	Ruth Forrest	Unopposed		
Independent hold		Swing	N/A	

=== Elections in the 2000s ===
==== 2005 ====
Tasmanian Legislative Council periodic elections, 2005: Murchison
Party	Candidate	Votes	%	±%
Independent	Ruth Forrest	5,955	28.96	N/A
Independent	Kevin Hyland	5,428	26.40	N/A
Independent	John Oldaker	4,367	21.24	N/A
Independent	Alwyn Bond	2,946	14.33	N/A
Greens	Scott Jordan	1,864	9.07	N/A
Total formal votes		20,560	96.46	+0.10
Informal votes		755	3.54	−0.10
Turnout		21,315	89.22	+1.08
Two-candidate-preferred result
Independent	Ruth Forrest	10,549	51.37	N/A
Independent	Kevin Hyland	9,986	48.63	N/A
Independent hold		Swing	N/A	
