= Herbert Hudd =

Australian politician

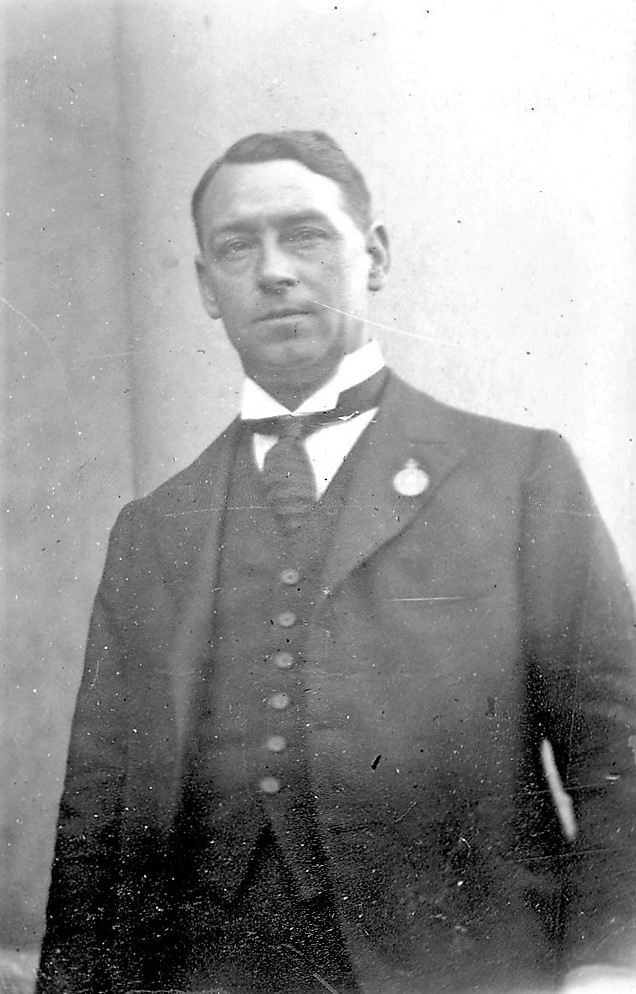

Sir Herbert Sydney Hudd KBE MC (25 February 1881 – 30 April 1948) was an Australian politician who represented the South Australian House of Assembly seats of Torrens from 1912 to 1915 for the Liberal Union and Alexandra from 1920 to 1938 and from 1941 to 1948 for the Liberal Federation and the Liberal and Country League.

Hudd was born in Adelaide and educated at Grote Street State School. He worked in his father's chocolate factory at Medindie before becoming managing director of the company. He served as a captain with the First Australian Imperial Force in World War I, and was awarded the Military Cross in 1918. He was a member of the Adelaide Hospital board from 1912 to 1925, president of the South Australian Literary Societies' Union from 1913 to 1914, a member of the University of Adelaide council from 1921 to 1924, deputy chairman of the Institute of Medical and Veterinary Science and chairman of Adelaide Cement Company Limited from 1947.

Hudd was elected to the House of Assembly as one of five members for Torrens at the 1912 election. The district was abolished as a result of the redistribution prior to the 1915 election and Hudd was unsuccessful as a candidate for Sturt. He returned to the Assembly in 1920 as one of three members for Alexandra, holding the seat until 1938. He was Commissioner for Public Works, Minister for Railways and Minister for Marine in Richard Layton Butler's government from 1933 to 1938. The redistribution for the 1938 election saw the abolition of multi-member districts and Hudd was narrowly defeated for Alexandra by 27 votes by George Connor (Independent). Connor did not contest the 1941 election and Hudd was elected unopposed. Hudd retained the seat until his death in 1948.

He was appointed a Knight Commander of the Order of the British Empire (KBE) in 1937.

He married Mabel Law Smith (1878 – ), daughter of Richard Smith in 1919. They had no children.

Political offices
Preceded by John McInnes	Commissioner of Public Works; 1933 – 1938	Succeeded by Malcolm McIntosh
Parliament of South Australia
Preceded by George Dankel	Member for Torrens; 1912–1915; With: Crawford Vaughan; Thomas Smeaton; Herbert Parsons; Frederick Coneybeer	District abolished
Preceded by Archibald Peake	Member for Alexandra; 1920–1938; With: George Laffer / George Connor; George Ritchie / Percy Heggaton	District abolished
Preceded by George Connor	Member for Alexandra; 1941–1948	Succeeded by Ted Chapman
