= 2017 Tasmanian Legislative Council periodic election =

Legislative election in Tasmania, Australia

| ← 2016 | 6 May 2017 | 2018 → |

3 of the 15 seats in the Legislative Council 8 seats needed for a majority
| | First party | Second party |
|---|---|---|
| Party | Independent | Labor |
| Seats before | 3 | 0 |
| Seats won | 2 | 1 |
| Seat change | ▼1 | ▲1 |

Periodic elections for the Tasmanian Legislative Council were held on 6 May 2017. The three seats up for elections were Launceston, Murchison and Rumney. They were previously contested in 2011.

== Launceston ==
The seat of Launceston, based in the inland Tasmanian city of Launceston, has been held by independent member Rosemary Armitage since 2011.

=== Launceston Results ===
Tasmanian Legislative Council periodic elections, 2017: Launceston
| Party | Candidate | Votes | % | ±% |
|---|---|---|---|---|
| Independent | Rosemary Armitage | 6,891 | 34.99 | +3.26 |
| Independent | Neroli Ellis | 5,938 | 30.15 | +30.15 |
| Labor | Brian Roe | 2,819 | 14.31 | −5.42 |
| Independent | Mark Tapsell | 1,654 | 8.40 | +8.40 |
| Greens | Emma Anglesey | 1,441 | 7.32 | +7.32 |
| Shooters and Fishers | Matthew Allen | 952 | 4.83 | +4.83 |
| Total formal votes | | 19,695 | 96.35 | −0.29 |
| Informal votes | | 746 | 3.65 | +0.29 |
| Turnout | | 20,441 | 84.22 | −6.87 |
Two-candidate-preferred result
| Independent | Rosemary Armitage | 10,151 | 52.16 | −4.01 |
| Independent | Neroli Ellis | 9,312 | 47.84 | +47.84 |
| Independent hold | | Swing | n/a | |

== Murchison ==
The west coast seat of Murchison has been held by independent member Ruth Forrest since 2005.

=== Murchison Results ===
Tasmanian Legislative Council periodic elections, 2017: Murchison
| Party | Candidate | Votes | % | ±% |
|---|---|---|---|---|
| Independent | Ruth Forrest | 11,168 | 56.68 | N/A |
| Independent | Daryl Quilliam | 8,534 | 43.32 | N/A |
| Total formal votes | | 19,702 | 96.68 | N/A |
| Informal votes | | 676 | 3.32 | N/A |
| Turnout | | 20,378 | 84.40 | N/A |
| Independent hold | | Swing | N/A | |

== Rumney ==
The south-eastern seat of Rumney had been held by Tony Mulder since 2011. Mulder was defeated by the Labor candidate, Sarah Lovell.

=== Rumney Results ===
Tasmanian Legislative Council periodic elections, 2017: Rumney
| Party | Candidate | Votes | % | ±% |
|---|---|---|---|---|
| Labor | Sarah Lovell | 7,643 | 33.77 | +14.04 |
| Independent Liberal | Tony Mulder | 6,077 | 26.85 | −4.88 |
| Independent | Steve Mav | 4,179 | 18.46 | +18.46 |
| Independent | Shelley Shay | 1,839 | 8.12 | +8.12 |
| Shooters and Fishers | Cheryl Arnol | 1,616 | 7.14 | +7.14 |
| Independent | Debra Thurley | 1,281 | 5.66 | +5.66 |
| Total formal votes | | 22,635 | 96.10 | −0.54 |
| Informal votes | | 919 | 3.90 | +0.54 |
| Turnout | | 23,554 | 84.45 | −0.88 |
Two-candidate-preferred result
| Labor | Sarah Lovell | 11,626 | 52.26 | +5.41 |
| Independent Liberal | Tony Mulder | 10,622 | 47.74 | −5.41 |
| Labor gain from Independent Liberal | | Swing | +5.41 | |
