= George Laffer =

Australian politician (1866–1933)

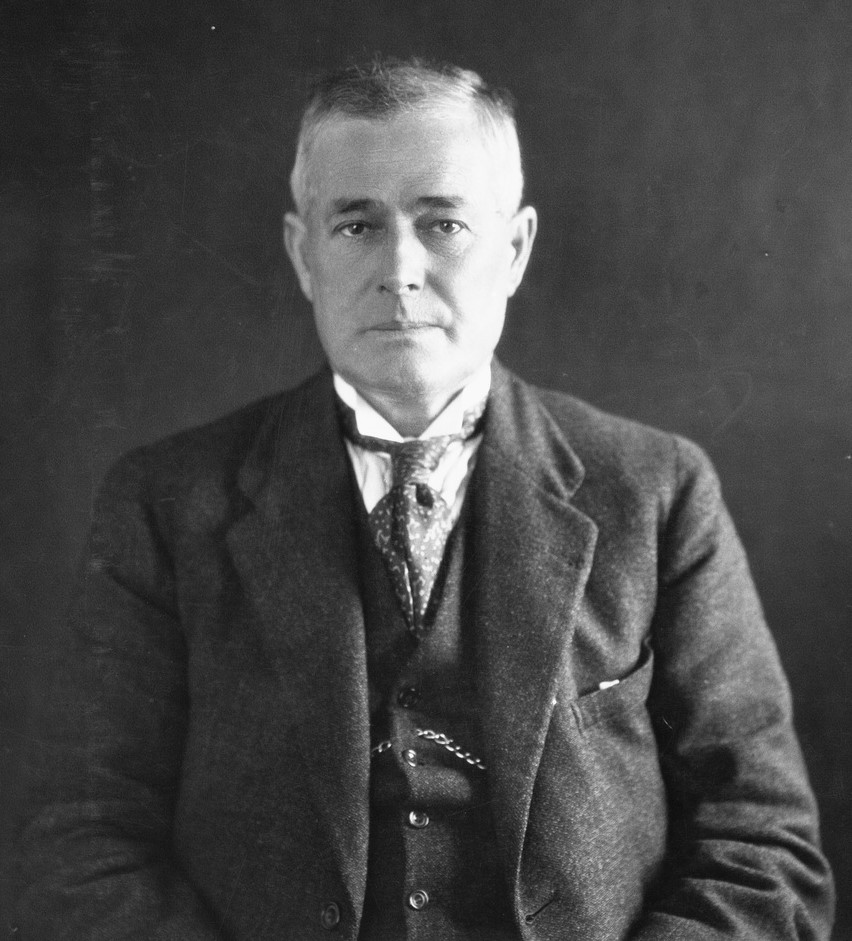

George Richards Laffer (14 September 1866 – 7 December 1933) was an Australian politician. He was member of the South Australian House of Assembly from 1913 until 1933, representing the electorate of Alexandra for the Liberal Union, and its successors the Liberal Federation and Liberal and Country League. He was a minister in the Barwell government, and was Speaker of the South Australian House of Assembly from 1927 until 1930.

Laffer was born at Coromandel Valley into a fruit-growing family, his father having emigrated from Cornwall in 1840. He continued in the family business, and was actively involved in agricultural organisations, serving as a founder of the South Australian Fruitgrowers' Association, life member of the Agricultural Bureau, and as chairman of the Advisory Board of Agriculture. He served nine years on the Mitcham District Council, including four years as chairman.

Laffer was elected to the House of Assembly for Alexandra on his third attempt in 1913. He was chairman of committees from 1918 to 1920, and was promoted to the ministry when Henry Barwell became Premier, serving as Commissioner of Crown Lands and Immigration and Minister for Repatriation until the government's defeat in 1924. Laffer was appointed Speaker after the Liberal Federation, in coalition with the Country Party, won the election of 1927 under Richard Layton Butler, serving until their defeat in 1930. He was a member of a Royal Commission into illegal betting and the licensing of bookmakers from 1932 until 1933. He died suddenly in office in 1933, and received a state funeral before being buried at Mitcham Anglican Cemetery.

South Australian House of Assembly
Preceded by William Blacker	Member for Alexandra; 1913 – 1933; Served alongside: Ritchie, Heggaton, McDonald, Peake, Hudd	Succeeded by George Connor
Preceded by Frederick Birrell	Speaker of the South Australian House of Assembly; 1927–1930	Succeeded by Eric Shepherd
