= Cecily Rosol =

Australian politician

Cecily Rosol MP
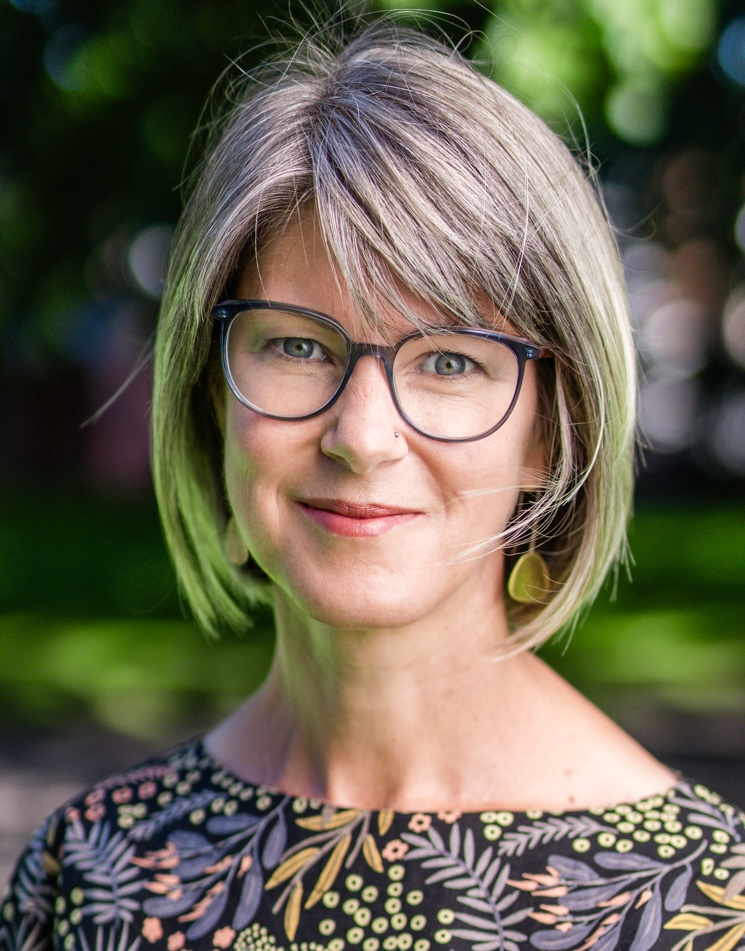

Member of the Tasmanian House of Assembly for Bass
- Incumbent
- Assumed office 23 March 2024 Serving with 6 others

Personal details
- Born: 2 January 1975 (age 51) Dandenong, Victoria
- Party: Greens
- Education: University of Newcastle; University of New England
- Profession: Nurse and counsellor

Cecily Ann Rosol (born 2 January 1975) is an Australian politician for the Tasmanian Greens representing the division of Bass in the House of Assembly since the 2024 Tasmanian state election. Prior to her election, Rosol ran a counselling business called "Thrive Launceston", and has previously worked as a registered nurse.

Rosol holds a Bachelor of Applied Science (Nursing) from the University of Newcastle and a Graduate Diploma of Counselling from the University of New England.

== Political career ==
Prior to 2024, Rosol unsuccessfully contested multiple elections for the Greens, including:

- Bass in the 2021 Tasmanian state election
- Bass in the 2022 Australian federal election
- City of Launceston Council in the 2022 Tasmanian Local Government elections
- Launceston in the 2023 Tasmanian Legislative Council periodic election

When the House of Assembly was restored to 35 seats at the 2024 Tasmanian state election, Rosol was elected to the 5th seat in Bass. This saw a 2.8% swing towards Greens candidates in the electorate. Prior to her election, Bass had not had a Greens representative since the defeat of Andrea Dawkins in the 2018 Tasmania state election.

Rosol was re-elected at the 2025 Tasmanian state election.
