= William Knapman =

William Knapman (4 December 1830 – 24 June 1908) was a hotel owner, brewer and businessman in the young colony of South Australia. He founded the hotel owning firm of Knapman and Son which survived past the mid-20th century. His descendants included four of South Australia's most famous sportsmen, a well-known pianist and numerous publicans.

== History ==
William Knapman was born in Devonshire, England, served an apprenticeship as a carpenter, and married on 9 October 1853, at St. Andrew's Church, Plymouth, Charlotte Bowden, daughter of a farmer of Christow, near Exeter. They emigrated to South Australia on the Taymouth Castle, arriving in 1854. He worked as a carpenter until 1859, when he was the builder and first licensee of the Lord Exmouth Hotel on Lefevre Peninsula, now the suburb of Exeter. In 1860, he leased George Coppin's "White Horse Cellars" hotel and theatre at the corner of Commercial Road and St. Vincent Street, Port Adelaide. After seven years he was in a position to purchase the property, and converted the theatre to a brewery (in 1883 he moved the brewery to Cannon Street, dubbed it the "Cannon Brewery", and converted the property into a block of shops).

In 1873, he built the Port Pirie Hotel in Port Pirie, managed by his son-in-law Samuel Wills. In 1876 Knapman and his family moved to Port Pirie, where his wife managed the Port Pirie Hotel. In 1880, Maria Knapman, presumably William's sister, took over the Pilot Boat Hotel, Port Pirie. In 1895, having remarried after the death of Charlotte, he and his family moved to his residence "Canonteign" (perhaps named for Viscount Exmouth's mansion in Exeter, England) at the corner of Cannon Street and The Minories, Port Adelaide, where he died in 1908, survived by his widow, four children (Alf and Samuel Knapman, "Polly" Wills and "Lottie" Ritchie), 22 grandchildren, and seven great-grandchildren.

Around 1912, Knapman and Son contracted with South Australian Brewing Company to supply beer to its hotels, and the Cannon Brewery was closed down and became the Commercial Chemical Company.

== Family ==
William Knapman (4 December 1830 – 24 June 1908) married Charlotte Bowden (c. 1835 – 30 May 1892). He married again, in 1895 to Mary (c. 1851 – 29 October 1939), the widow of Thomas Barret Brown; their residence was "Canonteign", corner of Cannon Street and The Minories, Port Adelaide. Their children included:

- Mary Elizabeth "Polly" Knapman (28 August 1854 – 20 June 1928) married Samuel Wills (2 December 1845 – 1922) on 24 February 1871. Their children were Fred Wills of Unley Park, Sydney Wills of Norton Summit, Percy Wills of Underdale, Amy Wills of Glenelg.
- William Henry Knapman (c. 1856 – 24 July 1900) was born at the Lord Exmouth Hotel, Le Fevre Peninsula, and educated at Thomas Caterer's school, Norwood. He married Grace Amy Wills (28 March 1860 – 6 March 1884) on 3 September 1876. Ran Crystal Brook Hotel c. 1878. He married again to Elizabeth Agnes Rieken (c. 1860 – 12 January 1950) on 21 October 1885. Lived Napier Street, Exeter. "Children William, Percy, Amy, Stanley, Bertie" In 1875, he took over management of the Crystal Brook Hotel from Benjamin Wills (his wife's brother), just a few months after building was completed, which he relinquished in 1879 to take control of his father's brewery. He died in 1900 of a bowel disease. His family included:

- Ethel Emma Knapman (c. 1884 – 5 May 1905) married Arthur Burley Jones (c. 1873 – 9 November 1949) Jones married again on 8 June 1912, to Ada Muriel Ottaway. He was prominent businessman of Jones Brothers, Semaphore and Port Adelaide.
- William Hans Knapman (30 July 1886 – ) may have been oil company executive
- Percy Knapman (7 June 1888 – 1958), brick manufacturer
- Amy Elizabeth Knapman (31 October 1889 – ) married Vincent Frederick Gerhard ca. 1908
- Stanley Knapman (11 April 1892 – 20 August 1959) married Lillian Florence Grace "Flo" Austwick ( – 3 August 1975), lived on Woolnough Road Exeter, then Largs
- Albert "Bertie" Knapman (30 December 1893 – 1981) married Frieda Eleonore Herrmann (8 April 1889 – February 1974) on 19 April 1919, lived Parr Street Largs Bay.

- Charlotte Jane Knapman (29 September 1858 – 26 July 1872)
- (John) George Walter Knapman (19 May 1865 – 1901) first married to someone who lived (c. 1864 – 9 July 1894). He married again, to Ada Maud Wills (19 February 1875 – ) on 24 July 1895. He was licensee of Railway Hotel, Port Pirie, then Howe's Hotel, Solomontown, then the Franklin Harbor Hotel at Cowell. He died of a self-inflicted gunshot wound. Their children were:

- Arnold Wills Knapman (22 September 1896 – ) married Dorothy Oldham, (23 November 1896 – 1982) on 6 September 1920. Dorothy was a noted pianist, known as Dorothy Knapman from 1920 to 1947, when she resumed the name Oldham for professional engagements.
- May Knapman married Harrold Osborne Jones of Edinburgh Hotel, Mitcham, on 17 August 1910

- Alfred Ernest Albert "Alf" Knapman (24 December 1867 – 26 October 1918) married Ellen "Nell" Jellett (c. 1866 – 27 August 1916) on 29 May 1895, ran Port Pirie Hotel from 1893, Producers Club Hotel Grenfell Street from 1907

- Thelma Knapman (22 April 1896 – ) married Archibald Robert? Allen
- Vida Yvonne Knapman (1897 – 25 September 1940) married noted sportsman Vic Richardson on 29 January 1919. They had one son and three daughters. Their eldest daughter Jeanne Ellen Richardson married Flying Officer Arthur Martin Chappell on 26 September 1942; their sons Ian, Greg and Trevor were distinguished cricketers.
- Alfred Ernest Albert Knapman jun. (27 March 1899 – ) married Ivy Rosina Abbott, divorced 1939

- Charlotte A. "Lottie" Knapman (31 July 1874 – 10 August 1953) married George Ritchie ( – 7 August 1944) on 25 October 1899

- Isobel Ritchie (23 August 1900 – )
- Colin Knapman Ritchie (14 July 1902 – ) married Alexandra Mary May on 12 March 1927, residence "Montillie" (frequently spelled "Montpillie"), Port Lincoln
- Bruce Ritchie ( – ) married Margaret Mary Riggs on 5 February 1935, residence "Coolibah", Port Lincoln

- Samuel James Knapman (20 August 1876 – 2 April 1917) married Alice Louise McKenzie ( – 21 April 1941) on 24 November 1897.

- Charlotte Waycotte "Lottie" Knapman (31 August 1898 – ) married Henry Glenholme "Glen" Allnutt (2 March 1897 – ) on 20 February 1923, lived at North Adelaide.
- Wesley Bowden Knapman (23 June 1903 – December 1941) married Ena Fell McArthur (16 August 1908 – ) on 10 December 1935 and lived at Grange. Wesley was educated at Alberton and St. Peter's College, became a motor mechanic and served with the RAN; was lost in the sinking of HMAS Sydney.
- Lorna Mavis Knapman (14 March 1908 – 9 August 1989) married Herbert John Edwards ( – ), licensee of the Caledonian Hotel, Broken Hill, then the Grange Hotel.

Maria Knapman (c. 1843 – 14 August 1899), sister of William Knapman sen. of Port Adelaide, married James Smith (c. 1847 – 21 April 1908) of Prospect Farm near Port Pirie around January 1885. His previous wife Mary died 6 December 1882 aged 39, leaving five children. His third wife, Monte Kate Smith and two small daughters survived him.

=== Another William Knapman ===
William Henry Knapman (1864–1932) emigrated from Exeter, Devon. and is included here to avoid confusion with the more prominent Knapman family.

- William Henry "Harry" Knapman (c. 1864 – 7 March 1932) of Prince Street Alberton, later Coburg Road, Alberton; with S.A. Railways, married Clara Alice Gubbins ( – 28 April 1932) of Yongala on 23 January 1889.

- Florrie Knapman (4 November 1889 – 18 April 1954) married Clifton W. Remphrey on 2 April 1914, born at Petersburg (modern Peterborough), lived Coburg Road, Alberton. They had two children: Ronald and Joyce.
- Frank Henry Knapman (27 February 1892 – May 1978) of Glebe Street Alberton married Florence Alberta Zeitz on 4 April 1917. Their children included Dulcie, Ross and Ronda.
- Ella Knapman married Claude Mitchell on 22 November 1919.
- Roy Thomas Knapman ( – October 1989) married Thelma Grace Hamilton ( – May 1989). Roy was proprietor of a motor vehicle garage on Coburg Road, Alberton. Their children were Lolita, Bill and Necia.
- May Knapman ( – 20 July 1953) married Clement Murray Window on 27 April 1926
- Sylvia C. "Sylv" Knapman married Allan Boyce of Bondi, New South Wales on 10 February 1934.

== The Knapman hotels ==
William Knapman built and ran Lord Exmouth Hotel, LeFevre Peninsula (later Exeter) 1859–1862

William Knapman leased then owned White Horse Cellars, Port Adelaide 1860–1876. It was later named Black Diamond Hotel by Duncan Reid, previously captain of one of Henry Simpson's Black Diamond ships.

William Knapman built then ran Port Pirie Hotel 1876–1893

A. E. A. Knapman Port Pirie Hotel 1893–1902

Maria Knapman ran Pilot Boat Hotel (later West Suburban Hotel) in Port Pirie 1880–1886

J. G. W. "George" Knapman ran Howe's Hotel, Port Pirie 1885–1892

J. G. W. "George" Knapman was licensee of Railway Hotel, Solomontown, Port Pirie 1893–1899

J. G. W. "George" Knapman was licensee of Franklin Harbor Hotel, Port Lincoln 1900–1901

Benjamin Wills was briefly licensee of Crystal Brook Hotel 1875

W. H. Knapman ran Crystal Brook Hotel 1875–1878

The company Knapman and Son continued to own and operate South Australian hotels until 1973, when it was taken over by the Lion Brewing and Malting Co.
