= Frank Halleday =

Australian politician

Frank Andrew Halleday (8 October 1899 – 5 April 1988) was an Australian politician. He was a member of the South Australian Legislative Council from 1938 to 1943.

== History ==
Frank was the son of C. A. Halleday (1859 – 8 November 1924), a nurseryman of Aldgate, South Australia, a successful exhibitor at the Royal Adelaide Show as well as the shows of the various Adelaide Hills Agricultural and Horticultural Societies. He was Chairman of the Mount Lofty Horticultural Society, and a vice-president and life member of the Mount Barker Agricultural and Horticultural Society. He was also one of the founders of the Stirling East Church of Christ, and a trustee of the local cemetery. Halleday's grandparents, Mr. and Mrs. John Halleday, were among the earliest settlers of the Mount Lofty district.

Halleday was brought up in Aldgate and left home at the age of 13, working first on a dairy farm, then with the Coast Steamship Company, then the Adelaide Steamship Company at Port Adelaide. He joined the South Australian Railways, working as an attendant at various railway stations, including Mount Lofty, in the Crafers District. He studied accountancy and other commercial subjects at night school. At age 19 he returned to take over his father's business, with some success, but his interests lay more with farm animals, and he sold up the business to take up dairying and pig breeding. He helped set up a bacon curing factory.

He entered politics in 1938 as an Independent in the interests of the small farmer for the Southern division of the Legislative Council. He and fellow Independent Alec Bagot campaigned by the then novel method of touring the electorate with a caravan and sound system. He resigned his seat in mid-1943 to contest the Federal seat of Barker. There was no by-election, being so close to the end of his term. His candidature failed, as did his bid to re-enter the Legislative Council in his old seat in April 1944, though he polled well. Subsequent attempts to re-enter Parliament as an independent in 1947 and 1950 for Onkaparinga), 1952 (Stirling) and 1953 (his old Legislative Council seat) failed.

== Family ==
Halleday married Minnie Clark, daughter of Stanley (1853–1941) and Agnes W. F. Clark of Aldgate. Their children were eldest daughter Betty Joan (died 1952), Donald, Elva, Ray, and Connie.

Halleday had three brothers and four sisters: Herbert Arthur Halleday of Whyte Yarcowie, Rev. Norman Charles Halleday of Western Australia, and Edward A. Halleday (West Coast); Mrs. H. Payne of Riverton, Mrs. G. H. Matthews of Aldgate, Mrs. G. L. Hampton of Meadows, and Minnie E. Parrington.
