= Percy Heggaton =

Australian politician

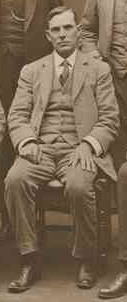

Member of the South Australian Parliament for Alexandra
- In office 1906–1915
- Preceded by: Charles Tucker
- Succeeded by: Multiple members
- In office 1923–1938
- Preceded by: George Ritchie
- Succeeded by: District abolished

Personal details
- Party: Liberal Union; Liberal Federation; Liberal and Country League

Percival Thomas (Percy) Heggaton (4 July 1869 – 14 December 1948) was an Australian politician who represented the South Australian House of Assembly multi-member seat of Alexandra from 1906 to 1915, when he voluntarily retired when the electorate's allocation went from four members to three. He stood again successfully in 1923, and held the seat until 1938 for the Australasian National League, Liberal Union, Liberal Federation and Liberal and Country League. He was for some time a member of the Public Works Committee.

== History ==
Mr. Heggaton was born at Middleton on 4 June 1869, the third son of William Heggaton (c. 1826 – 1 August 1916). He was educated at the local public school, then Whinham College, before dairy farming at Vaudon Downs on Hindmarsh Island. In 1900 he established a cheese and butter factory on the island. He was for nine years a councillor with the Port Elliot District Council and chairman of for five years. He was a regular and successful exhibitor at the Royal Show, and also had wide business interests in SA and Victoria.

== Family ==
On 22 February 1899, Percy Heggaton married Sara Grundy (6 February 1868 – 10 February 1958), daughter of Joseph Grundy, a pioneer of Second Valley. Their children included:

- Keith Vaudan Heggaton (28 August 1902 – 19 September 1928)
- Phyllis Alanna Heggaton (21 February 1905 – 14 November 1985) married Richard Neetlee Bagot (26 February 1904 – 2 April 1971) on 14 April 1932, lived at Walkerville. Richard was a grandson of Edward Meade Bagot.
- Reta Muriel Heggaton (3 January 1907 – ) married Rex Duirs McKellar (c. 1903 – 1986) on 10 June 1935, lived in Melbourne.
- Percival Neil Mostyn (Neil) Heggaton (10 January 1910 – 26 October 1997) married Primrose Malcolm Gordon ("Prim") Carr (6 August 1911 – 12 July 1961) on 29 July 1936, lived on Hindmarsh Island.

His youngest brother Rupert Dufty Heggaton MB ChM (11 March 1873 – 1958) married Elizabeth Louisa Burgess (1874 – ) on 11 March 1902, moved to Murrumburrah, where he ran a private hospital.

== See also ==
- Hundred of Heggaton
