= Tony Fletcher (politician) =

Australian politician (1934–2020)

Anthony William Fletcher (27 October 1934 – 27 August 2020) was an Australian politician. He was an Independent member of the Tasmanian Legislative Council from 1981 to 2005, representing first Russell and then Murchison.

Fletcher, who was born in Hobart, first entered the Council in 1981; although an Independent, he served as Leader of the Liberal Government in the Legislative Council from 1986–89 (during Robin Gray's premiership) and from 1996–98 (Tony Rundle's premiership). In 1999, the seat of Russell was replaced with Murchison, which Fletcher won. He retired from the Legislative Council in 2005.

The ashes of beloved Smithton Magpies CHFA legend Tony Fletcher were scattered in the railway end pack pocket of the Smithton football ground on 10 April 2022 as part of a Magpies' reunion following a request from his family. Mr Fletcher guided the club to nine premierships in the competition as playing coach between 1958 and 1968.

Tasmanian Legislative Council
Preceded by Charles Fenton	Member for Russell; 1981–1999	Abolished
New seat	Member for Murchison; 1999–2005	Succeeded by Ruth Forrest
