= Lin Thorp =

Australian politician

The Honourable Lin Thorp

Senator for Tasmania
- In office 20 June 2012 – 30 June 2014
- Preceded by: Nick Sherry

Member of the Legislative Council for Rumney
- In office 1999–2011
- Preceded by: Office created
- Succeeded by: Tony Mulder

Personal details
- Born: 4 November 1953 (age 73) Hobart, Tasmania
- Party: Australian Labor Party
- Education: University of Tasmania

Lin Estelle Thorp (born 4 November 1953) is a former Australian politician. She was a Labor Party member of the Tasmanian Legislative Council from 1999 until 2011, representing the electorate of Rumney, and serving as Minister for Human Services (2008–2010) and Minister for Education and Skills, Minister for Children, and Minister for Police and Emergency Management (2010–2011) in the Bartlett and Giddings governments. She was defeated for re-election to her state seat by independent Tony Mulder at the 2011 periodic elections, but was subsequently nominated to a casual vacancy for the Australian Senate in June 2012 caused by the resignation of Nick Sherry. She was defeated from the third position on the Tasmanian Labor Senate ticket at the 2013 federal election, and her term ended on 30 June 2014.

== Early life ==
Thorp was born in Hobart, Tasmania. She studied education at the University of Tasmania and Tasmanian College of Advanced Education, and subsequently taught at Taroona High School and Hobart College.

== Political career ==
=== Tasmanian Legislative Council ===
Her political interests include community support, women's issues, reconciliation, multiculturalism, the natural environment and social justice. During her time as Labor member she claimed a number of government achievements in information technology, including the opening of an online access centre in Clarendon Vale and the $4 million "Laptops for Teachers" program. She also spoke out against the Howard federal government's sale of Telstra. Other programs she was involved in included: diabetes camps for teenagers, 2004 Indian Ocean earthquake aid efforts and Landcare Australia funding deals. In 2005, Thorp quoted, in tears, lyrics from John Lennon's song "Imagine", when the government introduced new anti-terrorism laws.

Thorp faced election in the division of Rumney on 7 May 2005, and won with an outright majority of 50.96%, so there was no need to distribute preferences. She became Minister for Human Services on 17 September 2008.

As a Legislative Councillor, she was not up for re-election at the 2010 Tasmanian state election. However, the ensuing portfolio reshuffle on 21 April 2010, saw her become the new Minister for Education and Skills, Minister for Children, and Minister for Police and Emergency Management.

She was defeated by Tony Mulder at the elections held on 7 May 2011.

=== Australian Senate ===
Thorp won 89 per cent of the preselection vote to fill the vacancy caused by the retirement of stalwart Nick Sherry. She was appointed to the Senate by a joint sitting of the Tasmanian Parliament on 20 June 2012, and sworn in on 21 June. She was unsuccessful at the Senate election on 7 September 2013 and her term ended on 30 June 2014.

Tasmanian Legislative Council
Division created	Member for Rumney; 1999–2011	Succeeded by Tony Mulder
Political offices
Preceded by Lara Giddings	Minister for Human Services; 2008–2010	Succeeded by Nick McKim
Preceded by David Bartlett	Minister for Education and Skills; 2010–2011	Succeeded by Nick McKim
New ministry	Minister for Children; 2010–2011	Succeeded by Michelle O'Byrne
Preceded by Jim Cox	Minister for Police and Emergency Management; 2010–2011	Succeeded by David O'Byrne
