= Ted Chapman =

Australian politician

Personal details
- Born: William Edwin Chapman; 16 December 1933 Kingscote, South Australia
- Died: 25 July 2005 (aged 71) South Australia
- Party: Liberal Party
- Children: Vickie Chapman
- Parent(s): Ross Chapman and Gladys Chapman (née Dayman)

William Edwin (Ted) Chapman (16 December 1933 – 25 July 2005) was a Liberal member of the Parliament of South Australia from 10 March 1973 to 11 March 1992. He served as Minister of Forests and Minister of Agriculture from 18 September 1979 to 10 November 1982.

Chapman represented the district of Alexandra in the South Australian House of Assembly between 1973 and 1992. He served as Minister for Agriculture when David Tonkin was premier, taking a lead in promoting Australian dry-land farming in the Middle East.

Chapman died in hospital in July 2005 after incurring a brain hemorrhage two months earlier.

== Ministerial appointments ==
- 18 Sep 1979 – 10 Nov 1982 Minister of Agriculture.
- 18 Sep 1979 – 10 Nov 1982 Minister of Forests.

== Family ==
His daughter, Vickie Chapman, served as a state Liberal parliamentarian from the 2002 election until her resignation shortly after the 2022 election. She served as deputy Liberal leader from 2006 to 2009, and again from 2013 to 2021, at which time she was also the deputy premier of South Australia. She lost both positions in November 2021 when she resigned the Deputy Leadership, and thus deputy premier.
