= Ruth Forrest =

Australian politician (born 1962)

The Honourable Ruth Forrest MLC

Member of the Tasmanian Legislative Council for Murchison
- Incumbent
- Assumed office 7 May 2005
- Preceded by: Tony Fletcher

Personal details
- Born: 4 March 1962 (age 64) Burnie, Tasmania, Australia
- Party: Independent
- Other political affiliations: Labor – affiliated
- Spouse: Rob Woolley
- Children: 4
- Education: Flinders University

Ruth Jane Forrest (born 4 March 1962) is an Australian politician who has served as the legislative councillor for Murchison since 7 May 2005, as an independent.

Prior to her tenure in the legislative council she was a registered nurse and midwife.

== Early life ==
Ruth Jane Forrest was born in Burnie, Tasmania, Australia, on 4 March 1962, to Margaret and Keith Emmerton. Her family were farmers in North West Tasmania. She attended Riana Area School from 1968 to 1973, Ulverstone High School from 1974 to 1977, and Hellyer College in 1978.

Forrest was educated at the North Western General Hospital from 14 February 1979 to 25 February 1984, as a general nurse and midwife. From 1982 to 1988, she worked as a registered nurse at North Western General Hospital. From 1988 to 2005, she worked as a registered nurse and midwife in Burnie. She graduated from Flinders University with a Masters Of Midwifery after attending from 2002 to 2010.

== Career ==
In the 2005 election Forrest won a seat in the Tasmanian Legislative Council for the electoral division of Murchison as an independent politician. She was the first woman to represent that seat and was reelected in 2011, 2017 and 2023. During her tenure in the legislative council she has served as chair of the Public Accounts and Gender and Equality committees.

Forrest was named one by the Australian Financial Review as one of its 100 Women of Influence in the category of Public Policy in October 2019.

On 10 August 2025, Labor Leader Dean Winter announced that if the party succeeds in government formation following the 2025 State Election, he will appoint Forrest as Treasurer of Tasmania. Winter was not able to form a minority government, and Forrest did not take up any positions in the successful Rockliff minority government .

== Personal life ==
Forrest married Rob Woolley, with whom she had four children.

== Works cited ==
=== News ===
- Patten, Sally (22 October 2019). "AFR's 11 most influential women revealed". Australian Financial Review. Archived from the original on 15 July 2025.

=== Web ===
- "Ruth Jane Forrest". Tasmanian Legislative Council. Archived from the original on 15 July 2025.
- "Ruth Forrest". Ruth Forrest. Archived from the original on 15 July 2025.

Tasmanian Legislative Council
Preceded by Tony Fletcher	Member for Murchison; 2005–present	Incumbent
