= Charles Tucker (politician) =

Australian politician (1857–1928)

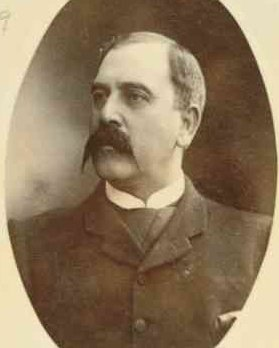

Mayor of Adelaide
- In office 1894–1898

Member of the South Australian House of Assembly for Encounter Bay
- In office 29 April 1899 to 6 July 1899 and 29 July 1899 to 2 May 1902

Member of the South Australian House of Assembly for Alexandra
- In office 3 May 1902 to 2 November 1906

Personal details
- Born: 20 February 1857
- Died: 5 December 1928 (aged 71)

Charles Tucker (20 February 1857 – 5 December 1928) was Mayor of Adelaide from 1894 to 1898 and a member of the South Australian House of Assembly for the seats of Encounter Bay and Alexandra.

Tucker was born at Walkerville, South Australia, son of shopkeeper William Henry Tucker (c. 1825–1899) and his wife Eliza Mary Tucker, née Samler (c. 1823–1909), who arrived in South Australia in 1836.

He was educated at Unwin's school in Walkerville, J. L. Young's Adelaide Educational Institution in Parkside, followed by private tuition. He started his working life at Port Adelaide in 1879 with G. R. Selth, next became manager for Graves & Co., then partner in E. Malpas & Co., shipping and customs agents; he purchased Malpas's share in the company in 1880, becoming sole owner. His fortunes rose when he was appointed shipping and customs agent for John Martin's, the titular head of which became his brother-in-law.

In 1888 he was elected councillor for the East Ward, City of Port Adelaide, and fifteen months later succeeded Ralph Wheatley Odgers Kestel (died 1903) as mayor, a position he held for three years. In 1893 he was elected alderman for the City of Adelaide and mayor in 1894.

He was associated with a variety of mining firms such as F. Ayers, Blades, Gall, Scandinavian mine at Purnamoota, Euriowie, Teetulpa, Newcastle mine, Thackaringa Copper mine and Balhannah goldmining company. He was the owner of Trinity Moonta Mine.

Tucker was a member of the Assembly for Encounter Bay (29 April 1899 to 6 July 1899 and 29 July 1899 to 2 May 1902) and Alexandra (3 May 1902 to 2 November 1906).

"On 12 February 1907, as customs agent for John Martin's, Tucker was found guilty of having defrauded the Customs Department during the 1890s of duties payable on goods imported by the firm. His brother and nephew were also implicated. The amount involved approached £33,000 of which Tucker's share had been about £2,000 a year for more than a decade. Tucker was sentenced to two years imprisonment with hard labour; The Observer cautioned against 'the pretensions of smooth-tongued and clever individuals of gentlemanly address and suitably captivating manners'. It had been South Australia's longest criminal trial: there were 97 witnesses and some 8,000 exhibits, and the case ran for 31 days."

More sensational details of his private life were published by the Kalgoorlie Sun.

== Personal ==
Tucker married Mary Elizabeth Patterson on 19 October 1885; they had two children. According to the Kalgoorlie Sun, this was a secret marriage; he kept his wife in Victoria, employing his sister (Ellen Brown) to act as hostess while he was mayor of Adelaide (1894–1898).

His siblings included:

- Eldest brother William Henry Tucker (1843–1928) married Clara Sophia Hillier (died 1879). in 1863
- Eldest sister Elizabeth married Robert D. Marquis in 1865.
- Eliza Tucker (1849–1935)
- Emma Tucker (1853–1893)
- Wallace Tucker (1854–1902), co-accused with Charles Tucker and R. Maegraith.
- Margaret Tucker (1860–1948) married John Martin in 1881 of the store which became John Martin's According to the Kalgoorlie Sun, he died from "drink and debauchery". She subsequently married Henry Stanley Bleechmore, brother of Sidney Hewlett Bleechmore, the Assistant Crown Prosecutor.
- Ellen Jane Tucker (1862– ) married Tom Brown of Melbourne in 1886. She was the fifth daughter of W. H. Tucker.
- Frederick Tucker (1865– )
