= Alec Bagot =

Australian politician (1893–1968)

Edward Daniel Alexander "Alec" Bagot (25 December 1893 – 12 June 1968), also known as "E. D. A. Bagot", was an Australian adventurer, polemicist and politician active in the first half of the 20th century, and related to Captain Charles Hervey Bagot. Bagot began his career as a wireless operator and was aboard the RMS Olympic when she picked up distress signals from her sister ship Titanic.

== Early life ==
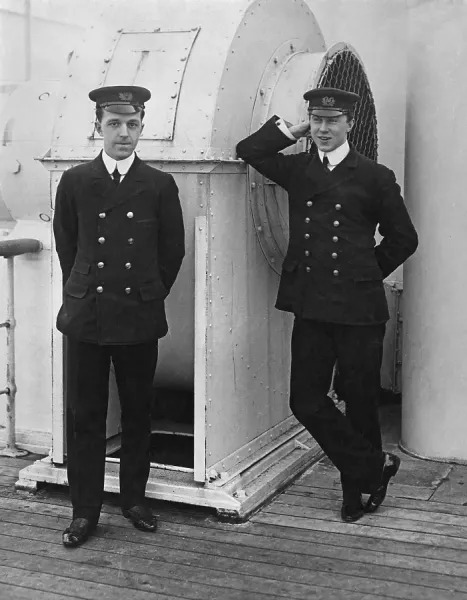
Second operator Bagot (right) with chief operator Ernest Moore of RMS Olympic, post-Titanic disaster.

His father, the Rev. Edward Arthur Bagot of Kildoon, County Kildare, and mother had arrived in Adelaide on Ormuz on 21 July 1891. Mrs Bagot had a daughter at 73 Hill Street, North Adelaide, and the son was born in Magill on Christmas Day, 1893. In 1894 they moved to Western Australia, where they had another son on 6 November 1895 at Cottesloe Beach and in 1899 returned to England, eventually retiring to Brighton.

E. D. A. Bagot was educated at Framlingham and Lowestoft Colleges, in Suffolk, joined the Marconi Wireless Telegraph Company, assigned as second wireless operator aboard RMS Olympic, with Ernest James Moore as chief operator, and was on that ship when she received the fateful last broadcasts of her sister ship Titanic.

== Military service ==
At the outbreak of war in 1914 he was in Australia working for the Commonwealth Radio Service (later Postmaster-General's Department) at Alberton, South Australia. He applied for enlistment several times, and was finally accepted on 11 September 1916, and married Christobel Bollen on 20 September 1916. (In his Army enlistment papers he gave his place of birth as Lowestoft, England.)

He joined the Australian Imperial Forces as a lieutenant in the 1st Australian (Wireless) Signals Squadron, led by Major Charles William Marr, and left on Karmala for the Middle East on 21 September 1916 and served in India and Mesopotamia, Mentioned in Despatches in 1918 (once not twice, and contrary to some references he was never awarded a DSO), promoted to captain on 1 October 1918 and returned to Australia on 14 April, his appointment terminating in Adelaide on 23 May 1919.

== Postwar life ==
After the war he spent another eight years organising tourist services between Iraq, Persia (now Iran) and Syria for the Mesopotamian Trading Agency of Ashar, Basrah. His wife may have joined him in 1924. He returned to South Australia in 1926 with the intention of setting up a regular service between Adelaide and Darwin via Oodnadatta and Alice Springs. He conducted a demonstration run with eight men and four women in three Studebaker cars and a Thornycroft truck, leaving Adelaide on 18 May and arrived in Darwin on 3 June; left there on 7 June and returned to Adelaide on 25 June, travelling via Camooweal, Queensland and Marree, South Australia, publicised by Duncan and Fraser (agents for both Thornycroft and Studebaker) and as they were equipped with a short-wave transceiver, gave nightly reports on radio 5CL. Despite a second successful round trip that year, Bagot abandoned his idea of regular service when the Commonwealth Government turned down his application for a subsidy. He found employment with General Motors and in 1930 "Captain Bagot" as he was called by admirers (or "'Alphabetical Bagot' as he was known to the many who disliked him), founded the Citizens' League of South Australia, which opposed Unionism, Communism and the White Australia Policy as benefiting the working classes, yet also opposing Fascism. This was the time of the Great Depression and he also supported the Young People's Employment Council and the Rev. Samuel Forsyth's (1881–1960) Forsyth Industrial Colony "Kuitpo Colony" near Kuitpo Forest, which was training boys as farm workers. The Citizen's League attempted political influence by promising support to political candidates, and was a factor in the election of the Independent candidate George Connor to the Assembly seat of Alexandra in 1934.

In 1933 he founded Wannaway Options Limited, a gold-mining company with ten leases in Western Australia. A new company, New Milo Gold Mining, was set up to take over the options held by Wannaway which was voluntarily liquidated in August the same year.

He was a committee member of the S.P.C.A., one of many organisations supported by Mrs Alec Bagot. He founded the Australian Listeners' League in 1937, with the principal aim of having the Radio Listener's Licence fee halved from one guinea (£1.1s) to 10/6d.

== Political life ==
After several abortive attempts to enter parliament, he was elected to the Southern District seat on the South Australian Legislative Council in a by-election in 1938, largely on his stand against five year parliamentary terms.

When not a full-time political operator, he was employed in the insurance industry in Adelaide then in 1943 moved to Broken Hill, from where he joined the Government Insurance Office of New South Wales. He was promoted and moved to Sydney, where amongst other duties he edited the in-house magazine Security, retiring in 1963. and wrote a well-received biography of George S. Coppin. His wife was a close friend of Coppin's daughter Lucy.

== Family ==
He married Christobel Bollen on 20 September 1916. Her father, Dr. Christopher Bollen (29 July 1866 – 12 September 1952) of "Clovelly", Woodville Road, Woodville then Fitzroy, South Australia, was notable as having possibly the longest practising life of any Australian medical practitioner. Mrs Alec Bagot, as she was generally known, was a keen actor and was involved in many charitable organisations.

They had one son, Edward Christopher (5 January 1922 – 14 January 1944), who enlisted in the RAAF in March 1941, and left for England in September 1942 became a Pilot Officer, flying Lancaster bombers in the Pathfinder force for Bomber Command over Germany and was lost, reportedly when his plane crashed near Watenstedt in the Brunswick area. In the absence of evidence, his mother never abandoned hope of his survival and spent years searching for the facts surrounding his disappearance, to the discomfort of the Air Force's Missing Research and Enquiry Service.

Their first home was "Clovelly", Woodville, South Australia then until 1937 "Wellington House", Wellington Square, North Adelaide; then 90 Jeffcott Street, North Adelaide (with a summer residence in Stirling West). Their Sydney home was initially at 104 Elizabeth Bay Road, Elizabeth Bay.

== Sources ==
Information regarding E. D. A. Bagot's military service and E. C. Bagot's death and other details were obtained from the National Archives of Australia online.

== Bibliography ==
- Roaming Around: Memoirs of a Marconi Operator, (unpublished)
- Coppin the Great: Father of the Australian Theatre, Melbourne Univ. Press, 1965.
