= Sarah Lovell =

Australian politician

The Honourable Sarah Lovell MLC

Member of the Legislative Council for Rumney
- Incumbent
- Assumed office 6 May 2017
- Preceded by: Tony Mulder
Shadow portfolios Since 2025
Willie Shadow Ministry
| 2025– | Leader of the Opposition in the Legislative Council |
| 2025– | Shadow Minister for Health, Mental Health, Wellbeing and Ageing |
| 2025– | Shadow Minister for Disability |
| 2025– | Shadow Minister for Women |

Personal details
- Born: 9 October 1980 (age 45) Springvale, Victoria, Australia
- Party: Labor Party

Sarah Elizabeth Lovell (born 9 October 1980) is an Australian politician. She has been the Labor member for Rumney in the Tasmanian Legislative Council since the 2017 periodic elections.

Lovell was a union organiser for United Voice before standing for Rumney. She defeated the incumbent MLC, independent Tony Mulder, to win the seat.

Tasmanian Legislative Council
| Preceded by Tony Mulder | Member for Rumney; 2017–present | Incumbent |
