= Electoral district of Alexandra =

Former South Australian state electoral district

Alexandra South Australia—House of Assembly
- State: South Australia
- Created: 1902
- Abolished: 1993
- Demographic: Rural

Alexandra was an electoral district of the House of Assembly in the Australian state of South Australia from 1902 to 1992, and was formed when the electoral districts of Encounter Bay, Mount Barker and Noarlunga were amalgamated. The district included the Fleurieu Peninsula, to the south of Adelaide.

Alexandra was renamed Finniss at the 1993 state election.

== Members for Alexandra ==
Four members (1902–1915)
Member	Party	Term	Member	Party	Term	Member	Party	Term	Member	Party	Term
William Blacker		1902–1906	Alexander McDonald	National League	1902–1910	George Ritchie		1902–1904	Charles Tucker	National League	1902–1906
William Blacker		1902–1906	Alexander McDonald	National League	1902–1910	George Ritchie	Farmers and Producers	1904–1910	Charles Tucker	National League	1902–1906
William Blacker	Liberal and Democratic	1906–1910	Alexander McDonald	National League	1902–1910	George Ritchie	Farmers and Producers	1904–1910	Percy Heggaton		1906–1910
William Blacker	Liberal Union	1910–1913	Alexander McDonald	Liberal Union	1910–1915	George Ritchie	Liberal Union	1910–1915	Percy Heggaton	Liberal Union	1910–1915
George Laffer	Liberal Union	1913–1915	Alexander McDonald	Liberal Union	1910–1915	George Ritchie	Liberal Union	1910–1915	Percy Heggaton	Liberal Union	1910–1915

Three members (1915–1938)
Member	Party	Term	Member	Party	Term	Member	Party	Term
George Laffer	Liberal Union	1915–1923	Archibald Peake	Liberal Union	1915–1920	George Ritchie	Liberal Union	1915–1922
George Laffer	Liberal Union	1915–1923	Herbert Hudd	Liberal Union	1920–1923	George Ritchie	Liberal Union	1915–1922
George Laffer	Liberal Federation	1923–1932	Herbert Hudd	Liberal Federation	1923–1932	Percy Heggaton	Liberal Federation	1923–1932
George Laffer	Liberal and Country	1932–1933	Herbert Hudd	Liberal and Country	1932–1938	Percy Heggaton	Liberal and Country	1932–1938
George Connor	Independent	1934–1941	Herbert Hudd	Liberal and Country	1932–1938	Percy Heggaton	Liberal and Country	1932–1938

Single member (1938–1993)
George Connor	Independent	1938–1941
Herbert Hudd	Liberal and Country	1941–1948
David Brookman	Liberal and Country	1948–1973
Ted Chapman	Liberal and Country	1973–1974
Ted Chapman	Liberal	1974–1992
Dean Brown	Liberal	1992–1993

== See also ==
- 1992 Alexandra state by-election
