= George Connor (Australian politician) =

Australian politician

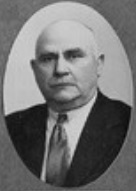

George Connor (15 August 1878 – 25 September 1941) was an Australian politician who represented the South Australian House of Assembly seat of Alexandra from 1934 to 1941 as an independent.

Connor was a farmer and veterinarian at Kangarilla before entering politics. He was the founder and president of the Organised Dairymen's Association of South Australia, a long-serving president of the McLaren Flat Agricultural Bureau, the founder of the McLaren Flat Show, and the promoter of the McLaren Flat vine and fruit pruning competition. He was elected to the House of Assembly at a 1934 by-election in the otherwise safe Liberal and Country League seat of Alexandra, following the death of conservative MP George Laffer. In his campaign, he was supported by the Dairymen's Association, Alec Bagot's Citizens' League and independent MP Tom Stott. He opposed tariffs for their impact on primary producers, opposed the extension of that term of parliament to five years, advocated a reduction in members of parliament in and the introduction of proportional representation, and suggested that funds for a proposed extension of Parliament House should be spent on primary producers instead.

He was re-elected at the 1938 election, defeating long-serving conservative MP Herbert Hudd upon the change from multi-member to single-member districts. In 1938, he was one of 14 of 39 lower house MPs to be elected as an independent, which as a grouping won 40 percent of the primary vote, more than either of the major parties. He retired at the 1941 election due to ill health, and died in September that year.
