= Tony Mulder =

Australian politician (born 1955)

Tony Mulder APM

Member of the Tasmanian Legislative Council for Rumney
- In office 7 May 2011 – 6 May 2017
- Preceded by: Lin Thorp
- Succeeded by: Sarah Lovell

Personal details
- Born: Teunis Mulder; 9 May 1955 (age 71) Rotterdam, Netherlands
- Party: Independent
- Other political affiliations: Liberal
- Occupation: Police officer

Teunis "Tony" Mulder APM (born 9 May 1955) is an Australian politician and perennial candidate. He was an independent member of the Tasmanian Legislative Council, representing the electoral division of Rumney from 2011 to 2017. Mulder is currently serving as a councillor on the Clarence City Council since 2018, having previously served as an alderman from 2005 to 2011.

He was born in Rotterdam in 1955, and his family emigrated to Australia in 1957. He studied political science at the University of Tasmania.

Mulder is a former police officer, and was a Commander in the Tasmania Police. He was director of the State Security Unit, the Tasmanian Police counter-terrorism taskforce.

Although running as an independent candidate, Mulder openly retains links to the Liberal Party, for whom he ran as a candidate for Franklin in the 2010 state election. Before the 2010 election, the Labor Party lodged a complaint that Mulder may have breached the Electoral Act when he appeared in a television advertisement wearing a police uniform, giving the impression that he was still a serving police officer. He was cleared of breaching the Electoral Act by the Tasmanian Electoral Commission.

Mulder was defeated by Labor candidate Sarah Lovell at the 2017 election for Rumney. He unsuccessfully contested the new seat of Prosser at the 2018 periodic election, the lower house seat of Franklin at the 2024 state election, and the legislative council seat of Pembroke in the 2025 periodic election.

Tasmanian Legislative Council
| Preceded by Lin Thorp | Member for Rumney; 2011–2017 | Succeeded by Sarah Lovell |
