= Independent politicians in Australia =

Independents
- House of Representatives: 8 / 151
- Senate: 3 / 76
- State and territory lower houses (Note: Nine in New South Wales, five in South Australia, four in the Northern Territory, five in Tasmania, one in Queensland, one in Victoria, and one in Western Australia.): 26 / 455
- State and territory upper houses (Note: Seven in Tasmania, two in New South Wales, two in Victoria, one in South Australia, and one in Western Australia.): 13 / 155

Independents with party affiliations
- House of Representatives: 1 / 151
- Senate: 1 / 76
- State and territory lower houses (Note: One in Victoria.): 1 / 455
- State upper houses (Note: One in Victoria and one in Western Australia.): 2 / 155

An independent politician is a person who has served in a political office while not affiliated to any political party. Many of these have either resigned or been expelled from membership in political parties, and some have gone on to form their own political parties over time. In some cases members of parliament sit as an independent while still holding party leadership. This can be for a multitude of reasons including expulsion from party room, de-registration of party and suspension of membership.

== Background ==
In Australia, all federal and state governments except Queensland operate on a bicameral parliament, with a lower house and an upper house each. Control of each house is formed by either a majority parliament, where a single party or a coalition of parties, holds enough seats to hold power through an electoral term in their own right. When a party is unable to win enough seats in an election, this is known as a "hung parliament", the larger parties are required to meet with smaller third parties and independents in order to make compromises and agreements in order to have a majority of seats, known as forming a minority government. Most elections in Australian history have resulted in Majority governments. In every case where there have been minority governments, the balance of power has been predominantly in the hands of independent members of parliament, meaning the individual is not attached to, or affiliated with, a political party.

There are numerous reasons why someone may stand for office as an independent:

- Parties only run a single candidate in the House of Representatives, in order to limit campaign costs and complexity. Some candidates attempt to become a candidate for a party in the pre-selection stage, and are unsuccessful. Instead of putting their support behind the successful pre-selectees, some choose to transition their efforts into an independent candidacy for office.
- Some independent politicians come from party backgrounds, and have either voluntarily withdrawn from parties due to factional or values-based misalignment or in protest of certain political actions, or have been removed by the party for similar reasons.
- Some independent politicians may not find enough common ground with the parties available, either from the positioning on the political spectrum, or the effectiveness in fulfilling their electoral mandate, and believe that standing apart from a party will prove more effective.

All politicians in Australia are still required to fulfil their obligations, if elected, regardless of whether they are independent or are part of a political party. All are also afforded the opportunity to speak on behalf of their electorate or district, if a member of the House of Representatives, or state or region, if a member of the senate.

== Federal ==
Before 2022, independents were not often elected to the federal Parliament of Australia. Historically independents were more commonly elected to state parliaments. In 2022 seven new independents were elected to the House of Representatives of whom only one was previously active in one of the traditional political parties; many of these were known as teal independents, a loose collective of social progressives challenging moderate Liberal seats. Historically, many independents were former members of one of Australia's main parties, the Australian Labor Party, the Liberal Party of Australia and the National Party of Australia. On 16 July 2013, a political party named the Australian Independents was registered with the Australian Electoral Commission. It was deregistered on 4 February 2016.

=== House of Representatives ===
Casual vacancies in the House of Representatives of independent members are filled in the same way as for party members, i.e., by a by-election.

==== Won election as independent ====
Member	Electorate	Term	Notes
Alexander Paterson	Capricornia, Qld	1901–1903	Independent Free Trade.
James Wilkinson	Moreton, Qld	1901–1904	Independent Labour. Joined Labour caucus in 1904.
Sir Frederick Holder	Wakefield, SA	1901–1909	Elected as a Free Trader; became an independent on election as inaugural Speaker.
George Fairbairn	Fawkner, Vic	1906–1909	Part of the independent "Corner group". Joined the Liberal Party at the Fusion in 1909.
Sir John Quick	Bendigo, Vic	1906–1909	Part of the independent "Corner group"; formerly a Protectionist from 1901 to 1906. Joined the Liberal Party at the Fusion in 1909.
Sydney Sampson	Wimmera, Vic	1906–1909	Part of the independent "Corner group". Joined the Liberal Party at the Fusion in 1909.
Agar Wynne	Balaclava, Vic	1906–1909	Part of the independent "Corner group". Joined the Liberal Party at the Fusion in 1909.
Sir William Lyne	Hume, NSW	1909–1913	A Protectionist who refused to join the Liberal Party at the Fusion of 1909.
George Wise	Gippsland, Vic	1909–1913; 1914–1916	A Protectionist who refused to join the Liberal Party at the Fusion of 1909. Joined the Nationalist Party in 1916.
Frederick Francis	Henty, Vic	1919–1922	Independent Nationalist. Joined the Nationalist Party in 1922.
William Watson	Fremantle, WA	1922–1928	Later held the seat for a term representing the United Australia Party.
Percy Stewart	Wimmera, Vic	1925–1926; 1930–1931	Defected from the Country Party; later formed the Country Progressive Party (1926–1930).
William McWilliams	Franklin, Tas	1928–1929	Previously served as a Revenue Tariffist, Liberal, Nationalist, and as the first leader of the Country Party.
Billy Hughes	North Sydney, NSW	1929–1930	Originally a Labor member and then a Nationalist, resigned to cross the floor to bring down the Bruce Government. Formed the Australian Party in 1930, which merged with the United Australia Party in 1931.
Walter Marks	Wentworth, NSW	1929–1930	A Nationalist who crossed the floor to bring down the Bruce Government. Joined the Australian Party in 1930, and then was defeated as a United Australia Party candidate in 1931.
George Maxwell	Fawkner, Vic	1929–1930	A Nationalist who crossed the floor to bring down the Bruce Government. Joined the Australian Party in 1930, and then the United Australia Party in 1931.
Sir Littleton Groom	Darling Downs, Qld	1929, 1931–1933	As the Nationalist Speaker of the House, refused to use his casting vote to save the Bruce Government. Defeated as an independent in 1929, but re-elected in 1931. Admitted to the United Australia Party in 1933.
Adair Blain	Northern Territory	1934–1949	As the member for the Northern Territory, only had the right to vote on matters directly relating to the Territory.
Percy Spender	Warringah, NSW	1937–1938	Independent United Australia Party. Defeated the endorsed UAP candidate and joined the party soon afterwards.
Alexander Wilson	Wimmera, Vic	1937–1945	Independent Country Party. A member of the United Country Party but sat in parliament as an independent.
Arthur Coles	Henty, Vic	1940–1941; 1941–1945	Briefly joined the United Australia Party in 1941.
Doris Blackburn	Bourke, Vic	1946–1949	Independent Labor. First female federal independent MP.
Lewis Nott	Australian Capital Territory	1949–1951	As the member for the Australian Capital Territory, could only vote on matters directly affecting the Territory. Previously the Nationalist member for Herbert in Queensland from 1925 to 1928.
Sam Benson	Batman, Vic	1966–1969	Expelled from the Labor Party for supporting continued Australian involvement in the Vietnam War.
Ted Mack	North Sydney, NSW	1990–1996	
Phil Cleary	Wills, Vic	1992; 1993–1996	Disqualified in 1992.
Peter Andren	Calare, NSW	1996–2007	
Graeme Campbell	Kalgoorlie, WA	1995–1996	Expelled from the Labor Party for supporting Australians Against Further Immigration. Formed the Australia First Party in 1996.
Paul Filing	Moore, WA	1996–1998	Lost Liberal preselection and ran as an independent.
Pauline Hanson	Oxley, Qld	1996–1997	Disendorsed Liberal. Formed One Nation in 1997.
Allan Rocher	Curtin, WA	1996–1998	Lost Liberal preselection and ran as an independent.
Bob Katter	Kennedy, Qld	2001–2011	Resigned from the National Party in 2001. Formed Katter's Australian Party in 2011.
Tony Windsor	New England, NSW	2001–2013	
Rob Oakeshott	Lyne, NSW	2008–2013	
Andrew Wilkie	Clark, Tas	2010–present	Held Division of Denison from 2010 to 2019, when the division was abolished and replaced by the Division of Clark
Cathy McGowan	Indi, Vic	2013–2019	
Kerryn Phelps	Wentworth, NSW	2018–2019	Lost seat to Dave Sharma in 2019.
Zali Steggall	Warringah, NSW	2019–2026	Formed Community Strong Australia.
Helen Haines	Indi, VIC	2019–present	First independent to succeed a previously elected independent (Cathy McGowan).
Kate Chaney	Curtin, WA	2022–present	
Zoe Daniel	Goldstein, VIC	2022–2025	
Dai Le	Fowler, NSW	2022–present	Formed the Western Sydney Community in 2023. Still sitting as an independent in parliament.
Monique Ryan	Kooyong, VIC	2022–present	
Sophie Scamps	Mackellar, NSW	2022–present	
Allegra Spender	Wentworth, NSW	2022–2026	Granddaughter of Percy Spender, who also won an election as an independent. Joined Community Strong Australia.
Kylea Tink	North Sydney, NSW	2022–2025	
Andrew Gee	Calare, NSW	2022–present	Resigned from the National Party in 2022 before being elected as an independent at the federal election in 2025.
Nicolette Boele	Bradfield, NSW	2025–present	

==== Not elected as independent ====
Member	Electorate	Term	Notes
Thomas Macdonald-Paterson	Brisbane, Qld	1903	Lost Protectionist preselection.
Norman Cameron	Wilmot, Tas	1906	Lost Anti-Socialist preselection.
James Ronald	Southern Melbourne, Vic	1906	Seat abolished; lost Labor preselection for Melbourne Ports.
David Storrer	Bass, Tas	1909–1910	Protectionist who refused to join the Liberal Party at the Fusion of 1909.
Jens Jensen	Bass, Tas	1919	Lost Nationalist preselection.
Bruce Smith	Parkes, NSW	1919	Lost Nationalist preselection.
William Higgs	Capricornia, Qld	1920	Expelled from the Labor Party. Joined the Nationalist Party eight months later.
Alexander Hay	New England, NSW	1922	Expelled from the Country Party.
Edward Mann	Perth, WA	1929	Nationalist who crossed the floor to defeat the Bruce government.
Maurice Blackburn	Bourke, Vic	1937; 1941–1943	Expelled (twice) from the Labor Party.
Thomas Marwick	Swan, WA	1943	Lost Country Party preselection.
Max Falstein	Watson, NSW	1949	Expelled from the Labor Party.
Charles Russell	Maranoa, Qld	1950–1951	Resigned from the Country Party.
Cyril Chambers	Adelaide, SA	1957–1958	Expelled from the Labor Party for attacking H. V. Evatt's leadership. Readmitted the following year.
Charles Morgan	Reid, NSW	1958	Lost Labor preselection.
Edward St John	Warringah, NSW	1969	Resigned from the Liberal Party.
Jeff Bate	Macarthur, NSW	1972	Lost Liberal preselection.
Alex Buchanan	McMillan, Vic	1972	Lost Liberal preselection.
John Gorton	Higgins, Vic	1975	Resigned from the Liberal Party; contested the Senate in the Australian Capital Territory.
Don Chipp	Hotham, Vic	1977	Resigned from the Liberal Party; about three months later, formed the Australian Democrats. Elected to the Senate in 1977.
Bill Wentworth	Mackellar, NSW	1977	Resigned from the Liberal Party and contested the Senate.
Keith Wright	Capricornia, Qld	1993	Expelled from the Labor Party.
Tony Smith	Dickson, Qld	1998	Lost Liberal preselection.
Paul Zammit	Lowe, NSW	1998	Resigned from the Liberal Party.
Andrew Theophanous	Calwell, Vic	2000–2001	Resigned from the Labor Party.
Peter King	Wentworth, NSW	2004	Lost Liberal preselection.
Gavan O'Connor	Corio, Vic	2007	Lost Labor preselection.
Harry Quick	Franklin, Tas	2007	Expelled from the Labor Party.
Michael Johnson	Ryan, Qld	2010	Expelled from the Liberal National Party.
Peter Slipper	Fisher, Qld	2011–2013	Resigned from the Liberal National Party on election as Speaker.
Craig Thomson	Dobell, NSW	2012–2013	Expelled from the Labor Party.
Dennis Jensen	Tangney, WA	2016	Lost Liberal preselection.
Julia Banks	Chisholm, Vic	2018–2019	Resigned from the Liberal Party.
Craig Kelly	Hughes, NSW	2021	Resigned from the Liberal Party, and later joined the United Australia Party.
Russell Broadbent	Monash, Vic	2023–2025	Lost Liberal preselection. Resigned from the Liberal Party.
Ian Goodenough	Moore, WA	2024–2025	Lost Liberal preselection. Resigned from the Liberal Party.
Barnaby Joyce	New England, NSW	2025	Resigned from The Nationals. Joined One Nation

=== Election results ===
Election	Seats won	±	First pref. votes	%
1901	2 / 75		103,832	21.01%
1903	2 / 75		63,218	▼8.77%
1906	5 / 75		79,051	▼8.31%
1910	2 / 75		80,478	▼6.09%
1913	0 / 75		49,194	▼2.59%
1914	1 / 75		31,915	▼1.89%
1917	0 / 75		34,755	▼1.85%
1919	1 / 75		56,947	▲2.98%
1922	1 / 75		51,538	▲3.28%
1925	2 / 75		51,251	▼1.76%
1928	1 / 75			▲3.41%
1929	4 / 75			▲6.02%
1931	3 / 75			▼6.00%
1934	1 / 74			▼3.02%
1937	3 / 74			▲4.89%
1940	2 / 74			▲7.46%
1943	3 / 74			▲12.15%
1946	2 / 74			▼1.82%
1949	1 / 121			▲2.16%
1951	0 / 121			▼1.05%
1954	0 / 121			▲1.11%
1955	0 / 122			▲1.37%
1958	0 / 122			▼0.63%
1961	0 / 122			▲0.68%
1963	0 / 122			▼0.47%
1966	1 / 128			▲1.45%
1969	0 / 128			▲2.53%
1972	0 / 128			▼0.96%
1974	0 / 128			▼0.40%
1975	0 / 128			▲0.82%
1977	0 / 128		50,267	▼0.63%
1980	0 / 128		58,338	▲0.70%
1983	0 / 128		50,891	▼0.59%
1984	0 / 128		90,333	▲1.04%
1987	0 / 128		153,205	▲1.66%
1990	1 / 148		257,139	▲2.60%
1993	2 / 147		329,235	▲3.11%
1996	5 / 148		262,420	▼2.41%
1998	1 / 148		195,180	▼1.76%
2001	3 / 150		332,118	▲2.89%
2004	3 / 150		292,036	▼2.49%
2007	2 / 150		276,370	▼2.23%
2010	4 / 150		312,496	▲2.52%
2013	2 / 150		177,217	▼1.37%
2016	2 / 150		380,712	▲2.81%
2019	3 / 151		479,836	▲3.37%
2022	10 / 151		776,169	▲5.29%
2025	9 / 150		1,044,992	▲7.6%

=== Senate ===
Senators elected as independents are quite rare. In modern politics, independent Brian Harradine served from 1975 to 2005 with considerable influence at times. Nick Xenophon was an elected independent Senator from his election to the Senate at the 2007 federal election. Xenophon was re-elected for another six-year term at the 2013 federal election. He was re-elected at the 2016 double dissolution election under the Nick Xenophon Team. DLP Senator John Madigan became an independent Senator in September 2014, but failed to be re-elected at the 2016 election. PUP Senators Jacqui Lambie and Glenn Lazarus became independent Senators in November 2014 and March 2015. At the 2016 election, Lazarus lost his seat and Lambie was re-elected under the Jacqui Lambie Network. In the 2022 election, former rugby player David Pocock was elected as an independent Senator from the ACT, becoming the first independent Senator from a territory and the first non-major party member of parliament from the ACT.

On 21 May 1977, a referendum to amend Section 15 of the Constitution was approved to require future Senate casual vacancies to be filled by a member of the party represented by the former senator at the time of their election, if the state parliament chooses to fill the vacancy. However, this requirement does not apply to independent senators.

==== Won election or appointed as independent ====
Member	State	Term	Notes
William Trenwith	Victoria	1904–1909	Joined the Liberal Party at the Fusion of 1909.
Reg Turnbull	Tasmania	1962–1969; 1970–1974	Briefly leader of the Australia Party (1969–1970).
Syd Negus	Western Australia	1971–1974	
Michael Townley	Tasmania	1971–1975; 1987	Joined the Liberal Party in 1975; resigned to sit as an independent again in 1987.
Cleaver Bunton	New South Wales	1975	Appointed by the New South Wales Parliament to replace a Labor senator.
Albert Field	Queensland	1975	Appointed by the Queensland Parliament to replace a Labor senator.
Brian Harradine	Tasmania	1975–2005	
Jo Vallentine	Western Australia	1985–1990	Resigned from the Nuclear Disarmament Party and re-elected under the "Vallentine Peace Group" ticket. Joined the Greens WA in 1990.
Nick Xenophon	South Australia	2008–2016	Re-elected in 2016 under Nick Xenophon Team.
David Pocock	ACT	2022–present	First independent from a territory, elected under David Pocock party.

==== Not elected as independent ====
Member	State	Term	Notes
Thomas Glassey	Queensland	1903	Lost Protectionist preselection.
Anderson Dawson	Queensland	1906	Announced retirement but then changed mind too late to overturn Labor preselection; contested as independent.
Sir Josiah Symon	South Australia	1909–1913	Free Trader who refused to join the Liberal Party at the Fusion of 1909.
Cyril Cameron	Tasmania	1913	Lost Liberal preselection.
James Ogden	Tasmania	1925–1926	Expelled from the Labor Party. Joined the Nationalist Party in 1926.
Walter Duncan	New South Wales	1929–1930	A supporter of Billy Hughes who was excluded from the Nationalist Party along with Hughes and his lower-house colleagues who voted to bring down the Bruce Government. Joined the Australian Party in 1930 and the United Australia Party in 1931.
Robert Elliott	Victoria	1934–1935	Lost Country Party preselection.
John Daly	South Australia	1934–1935	Expelled from the state Labor party for supporting James Scullin's economic policies.
Tom Arthur	New South Wales	1943–1944	Lost Labor preselection.
Thomas Crawford	Queensland	1945–1947	United Australia Party senator who was not asked to join the new Liberal Party.
Bill Morrow	Tasmania	1953	Lost Labor preselection, sought re-election as a "Tasmanian Labour Group" candidate.
Agnes Robertson	Western Australia	1955	Lost Liberal preselection. Joined the Country Party three weeks later and won re-election.
Clive Hannaford	South Australia	1967	Resigned from the Liberal Party over the government's support for the Vietnam War.
Reg Wright	Tasmania	1978	Resigned from the Liberal Party.
Neville Bonner	Queensland	1983	Lost Liberal preselection.
George Georges	Queensland	1986–1987	Resigned from the Australian Labor Party.
Don Jessop	South Australia	1987	Lost Liberal preselection.
Irina Dunn	New South Wales	1988–1990	Appointed by the Nuclear Disarmament Party to fill the vacancy caused by Robert Wood's disqualification, and refused to resign to allow Wood to return to the Senate; subsequently expelled from the NDP. Contested 1990 election under the ticket "Irina Dunn's Environment Independents".
Janet Powell	Victoria	1992–1993	Resigned from the Australian Democrats. Contested 1993 election under the ticket "Janet Powell Independents Network".
John Devereux	Tasmania	1994–1995	Resigned from the Labor Party.
Noel Crichton-Browne	Western Australia	1995–1996	Expelled from the Liberal Party.
Mal Colston	Queensland	1996–1999	Resigned from the Labor Party to accept the Liberal Party's nomination as Deputy President of the Senate. Sponsored the registration of the "Queensland First" political party but retired in 1999.
Meg Lees	South Australia	2002–2003	Resigned from the Australian Democrats in 2002. Formed the Australian Progressive Alliance in 2003.
Shayne Murphy	Tasmania	2002–2005	Resigned from the Labor Party.
John Madigan	Victoria	2014–2016	Resigned from the Democratic Labour Party.
Jacqui Lambie	Tasmania	2014–2016	Resigned from the Palmer United Party. Re-elected in 2016 under Jacqui Lambie Network.
Glenn Lazarus	Queensland	2015–2016	Resigned from the Palmer United Party.
Rod Culleton	Queensland	2016–2017	Resigned from Pauline Hanson's One Nation.
Lucy Gichuhi	South Australia	2017–2018	Refused to join merger of the Family First Party with the Australian Conservatives. Joined the Liberal Party in 2018.
Fraser Anning	Queensland	2018, 2018–2019	Resigned from Pauline Hanson's One Nation in January 2018. Joined Katter's Australian Party in June, but was expelled in October and became an independent again.
Steve Martin	Tasmania	2018	Expelled from the Jacqui Lambie Network before being sworn in. Joined the National Party several months later.
Tim Storer	South Australia	2018–2019	Resigned from the Nick Xenophon Team before being sworn in.
Cory Bernardi	South Australia	2019–2020	Disbanded the Australian Conservatives, the party he formed after resigning from the Liberal Party in 2017.
Rex Patrick	South Australia	2020–2021	Resigned from Centre Alliance in August 2020. Formed the Rex Patrick Team in 2021.
Lidia Thorpe	Victoria	2023–present	Resigned from the Greens in February 2023.
David Van	Victoria	2023–2025	Resigned from the Liberal Party in June 2023.
Tammy Tyrrell	Tasmania	2024	Resigned from the Jacqui Lambie Network in March 2024. Formed Tammy Tyrrell for Tasmania in September 2024.
Fatima Payman	Western Australia	2024	Resigned from the Labor Party in July 2024. Formed Australia's Voice in 2024.

== States and territories ==
=== New South Wales ===
==== New South Wales Legislative Assembly ====
===== Won election as independent =====
Member	Electorate	Term	Notes
James Geraghty	North Sydney	1950–1953	Re-elected as an independent in 1950 after being stripped of Labor preselection to recontest his seat.
John Seiffert	Monaro	1950	Re-elected as an independent in 1950 after being stripped of Labor preselection to recontest his seat; readmitted to caucus after the election.
Jim Chalmers	Hartley	1953–1956	Resigned from the Labor Party in 1953 and re-elected as an independent.
Tom Armstrong	Kahibah	1953–1957	
Bill Weiley	Clarence	1955	Elected as independent Country, then joined the Country Party.
Frank Purdue	Waratah	1959–1962; 1964–1965	
Douglas Darby	Manly	1962–1968	Resigned from the Liberal Party in 1962. Rejoined in 1968.
Harold Coates	Blue Mountains	1965–1976	
Joe Lawson	Murray	1968–1973	Resigned from the Country Party in 1968.
John Hatton	South Coast	1973–1995	
Ted Mack	North Shore	1981–1988	
Bruce Duncan	Lismore	1982–1988	Resigned from the National Party in 1982.
Frank Arkell	Wollongong	1984–1991	
Dawn Fraser	Balmain	1988–1991	
George Keegan	Newcastle	1988–1991	
Clover Moore	Bligh; Sydney	1988–2012	
Robyn Read	North Shore	1988–1991	
Ivan Welsh	Swansea	1988–1991	
Peter Macdonald	Manly	1991–1999	
Tony Windsor	Tamworth	1991–2001	
David Barr	Manly	1999–2007	
Tony McGrane	Dubbo	1999–2004	
Richard Torbay	Northern Tablelands	1999–2013	
Rob Oakeshott	Port Macquarie	2002–2008	Resigned from the National Party in March 2002. Re-elected as an independent in 2003 and 2007. Resigned from parliament in August 2008 to contest the Lyne federal by-election.
Peter Draper	Tamworth	2003–2011	
Dawn Fardell	Dubbo	2004–2011	
Alex McTaggart	Pittwater	2005–2007	
Greg Piper	Lake Macquarie	2007–present	
Peter Besseling	Port Macquarie	2008–2011	
Alex Greenwich	Sydney	2012–present	
Joe McGirr	Wagga Wagga	2018–present	
Gareth Ward	Kiama	2021–2025	Elected as a Liberal in 2011, was expelled from the party in 2021 and reelected as an independent.
Roy Butler	Barwon	2022–present	Elected as a Shooters, Fishers and Farmers in 2019, left the party in 2022.
Helen Dalton	Murray	2022–present	Elected as a Shooters, Fishers and Farmers in 2019, left the party in 2022.
Philip Donato	Orange	2022–present	Elected as a Shooters, Fishers and Farmers in 2016, left the party in 2022.
Judy Hannan	Wollondilly	2023–present	
Michael Regan	Wakehurst	2023–present	
Jacqui Scruby	Pittwater	2024–present	

===== Not elected as independent =====
Member	Electorate	Term	Notes
Clive Evatt	Hurstville	1956–1959	Expelled from the Labor Party in July 1956.
Alfred Dennis	Blacktown	1962	Resigned from the Liberal Party in 1962 after losing preselection for a safer seat.
Ben Doig	Burwood	1964–1965	Resigned from the Liberal Party in 1964 after losing preselection.
Bill Chaffey	Tamworth	1972–1973	Resigned from the Country Party in 1972.
Laurie McGinty	Willoughby	1977–1978	Resigned from the Liberal Party in September 1977 after losing preselection to recontest his seat.
Max Smith	Pittwater	1984–1986	Resigned from the Liberal Party in 1984. Resigned from parliament in 1986.
Terry Metherell	Davidson	1991–1992	Resigned from the Liberal Party in October 1991. Resigned from parliament in April 1992.
Terry Griffiths	Georges River	1994–1995	Resigned from the Liberal Party in October 1994.
Steven Pringle	Hawkesbury	2006–2007	Resigned from the Liberal Party in October 2006 after losing preselection for the 2007 election.
Milton Orkopoulos	Swansea	2006	Expelled from the Labor Party on 8 November 2006 after being charged with child sex offences. Resigned from parliament under threat of an expulsion vote on 13 November.
Steven Chaytor	Macquarie Fields	2007	Expelled from the Labor Party in January 2007.
Bryce Gaudry	Newcastle	2007	Resigned from the Labor Party in January 2007 after losing preselection for the 2007 election.
Chris Hartcher	Terrigal	2014–2015	Resigned from the Liberal parliamentary party due to Independent Commission Against Corruption investigations. Retired in 2015.
Chris Spence	The Entrance	2014–2015	Resigned from the Liberal parliamentary party due to Independent Commission Against Corruption investigations. Retired in 2015.
Darren Webber	Wyong	2014–2015	Resigned from the Liberal parliamentary party due to Independent Commission Against Corruption investigations. Retired in 2015.
Andrew Cornwell	Charlestown	2014	Stood aside from the Liberal parliamentary party on 6 August 2014 due to Independent Commission Against Corruption investigations. Resigned from parliament on 12 August.
Tim Owen	Newcastle	2014	Stood aside from the Liberal parliamentary party on 6 August 2014 due to Independent Commission Against Corruption investigations. Resigned from parliament on 12 August.
Garry Edwards	Swansea	2014–2015	Stood aside from the Liberal parliamentary party in August 2014 due to Independent Commission Against Corruption investigations. Recontested the 2015 election as an independent and lost.
Bart Bassett	Londonderry	2014–2015	Stood aside from the Liberal parliamentary party in August 2014 due to Independent Commission Against Corruption investigations. Retired in 2015.
Craig Baumann	Port Stephens	2014–2015	Stood aside from the Liberal parliamentary party in September 2014 due to Independent Commission Against Corruption investigations. Retired in 2015.
Glenn Brookes	East Hills	2016–2017	Resigned from Liberal Party in March 2016 after his campaign manager was charged with electoral offences, He re-joined the party in 2017. Retired in 2019.
Daryl Maguire	Wagga Wagga	2018	Resigned from the Liberal Party in July due to Independent Commission Against Corruption investigations. Resigned from parliament in 2018.
John Sidoti	Drummoyne	2021–2023	Resigned from Liberal Party due to Independent Commission Against Corruption investigation. Retired in 2023.
Tania Mihailuk	Bankstown	2022–2023	Resigned from Labor Party due to disagreements with the party. Joined One Nation in 2023 and ran for a seat in the upper house but failed to win.

==== New South Wales Legislative Council ====
===== Elected as independent =====
All of these MPs were indirectly elected by MPs under the former system between 1934 and 1978.

Member	Term	Notes
Frank Spicer	1934–1949	Had been a member of the Federal Labor Party in the 1931 Labor split, did not rejoin the party afterwards, joined the Country Party in 1949.
Joseph Gardiner	1934–1937	
Theodore Trautwein	1934–1940	
Stanley Parry	1940–1952	
Asher Joel	1958–1959	Joined the Country Party in 1959.
Harry Sullivan	1970–1974	Joined the Country Party in 1974.

===== Not elected as independent =====
Member	Term	Notes
Thomas Murray	1926–1958	Expelled from the Labor Party in 1926.
Hector Clayton	1937–1973	A United Australia Party member upon election, but subsequently resigned as he believed it should be a non-partisan house.
Toby MacDiarmid	1985–1989	Resigned from the National Party in April 1985.
Marie Bignold	1988–1991	Expelled from the Call to Australia Party in November 1988.
Richard Jones	1996–2003	Resigned from the Australian Democrats in March 1996. Did not face re-election in 1999. Retired in 2003.
Franca Arena	1997–1999	Expelled from the Labor Party in November 1997 after her unsubstantiated accusations of pedophilia led to the suicide of a Supreme Court judge.
Helen Sham-Ho	1998–1999	Resigned from the Liberal Party in June 1998.
David Oldfield	2000–2001; 2004–2007	Expelled from One Nation in October 2000. Founded One Nation NSW in 2001. Resigned from One Nation NSW in December 2004 and served out his term as an independent.
Gordon Moyes	2009	Expelled from the Christian Democratic Party in March 2009. Joined the Family First Party in November 2009.
Eric Roozendaal	2012–2013	Suspended from the Labor Party in November 2012. Resigned from parliament in May 2013.
Marie Ficarra	2014–2015	Stood aside from the Liberal parliamentary party in April 2014 due to Independent Commission Against Corruption investigations. Retired in 2015.
Mike Gallacher	2014–2017	Stood aside from the Liberal parliamentary party in May 2014 due to Independent Commission Against Corruption investigations.
Jeremy Buckingham	2018–2022	Resigned from The Greens in 2018 after he was accused of sexual violence. Ran as an independent in 2019 but failed to win re-election. Joined the Legalise Cannabis Party in 2022 and won a seat in the Legislative Council in 2023.
Matthew Mason-Cox	2021	Was expelled from the Liberal Party for two weeks due to a disagreement in the party
Fred Nile	2022	Former member of the Call to Australia Party, Christian Democratic Party, Christ in government (Fred Nile Alliance) and the Seniors United Party of Australia, he sat as an independent in 2022 before forming the Revive Australia Party.
Justin Field	2019–2023	Resigned from The Greens in April 2019 due to disagreement with party. Retired in 2023.
Mark Latham	2023–present	Resigned from One Nation after Leadership dispute with Pauline Hanson
Rod Roberts	2023–present	Left One Nation with Mark Latham
Tania Mihailuk	2024–present	Resigned from One Nation.
Taylor Martin	2024–present	Expelled from the Liberal Party due to bullying allegations.

=== Victoria ===
==== Victorian Legislative Assembly ====
===== Won election as independent =====
Member	Electorate	Term	Notes
Charlie Mutton	Coburg	1940–1956	Expelled from the Labor Party in 1940 after winning the seat as an Independent Labor candidate. Re-elected as an independent until he was readmitted to the Labor Party in 1956.
Bob Suggett	Moorabbin	1961–1964	Lost Liberal preselection for the 1961 election. Re-elected as an Independent Liberal. Readmitted to the Liberal Party in 1964.
Jack Mutton	Coburg	1967–1979	
Russell Savage	Mildura	1996–2006	
Susan Davies	Gippsland West	1997–2002	
Craig Ingram	Gippsland East	1999–2010	
Suzanna Sheed	Shepparton	2014–2022	
Ali Cupper	Mildura	2018–2022	
Russell Northe	Morwell	2018–2022	Initially became independent after resigning from the National Party 2017 for personal reasons. Elected in own right as independent at 2018 election.

===== Not elected as independent =====
Member	Electorate	Term	Notes
Charles Francis	Caulfield	1977–1979	Expelled from the Liberal Party after abstaining on an opposition no-confidence motion.
Doug Jennings	Westernport	1977–1979	Expelled from the Liberal Party after abstaining on an opposition no-confidence motion.
Harley Dickinson	South Barwon	1992	Resigned from the Liberal Party in May 1992 after losing preselection for the 1992 election.
Peter McLellan	Frankston East	1998–1999	Resigned from the Liberal Party in July 1998. Died on the day of the 1999 election while recontesting as an independent.
Geoff Shaw	Frankston	2013–2014	Resigned from the Liberal Party in March 2013.
Don Nardella	Melton	2017–2018	Resigned from Labor Party due to conflict of interest, retired.

==== Victorian Legislative Council ====
===== Not elected as independent =====
Member	Electorate	Term	Notes
Percy Feltham	Northern Province	1965–1967	Resigned from the Country Party in 1965 over a dispute about the Council presidency.
Alexander Knight	Melbourne West Province	1977–1979	Lost Labor preselection in 1977 for the 1979 election, and was an independent by that time.
Rod Mackenzie	Geelong Province	1987–1992	Resigned from the Labor Party in December 1987. Was not up for re-election in 1988. Formed the Geelong Community Alliance in 1992.
Carolyn Hirsh	Silvan Province	2004–2005, 2006	Expelled from the Labor Party in 2004 after being charged with drink-driving offences. Readmitted in 2005, but expelled again in 2006 after further charges were laid.
Dianne Hadden	Ballarat Province	2005–2006	Resigned from the Labor Party in April 2005.
Andrew Olexander	Silvan Province	2005–2006	Expelled from the Liberal Party in November 2005 following critical comments made after losing preselection due to a drink-driving scandal.
Rachel Carling-Jenkins	Western Metropolitan Region	2018	Resigned from the Democratic Labour Party in June 2017 to join the Australian Conservatives. Resigned from the Australian Conservatives in August 2018.
Catherine Cumming	Western Metropolitan Region	2018–2022	Resigned from Derryn Hinch's Justice Party prior to being sworn in following the 2018 election.
Adem Somyurek	South-Eastern Metropolitan Region	2020–2022	Resigned from Labor Party in 2020. Joined the DLP in 2022 and won in the Northern Metropolitan Region.
Kaushaliya Vaghela	Western Metropolitan Region	2022	Resigned from Labor Party in 2022. Formed the New Democrats and contested at 2022 election but lost seat.
Moira Deeming	Western Metropolitan Region	2023–2024	Expelled from Liberal Party room after attempting to sue party leader for defamation. Readmitted on 27 December 2024 after a leadership spill.

=== Queensland ===
==== Queensland Legislative Assembly ====
===== Won election as independent =====
Member	Electorate	Term	Notes
Frank Barnes	Bundaberg	1941–1950	
George Marriott	Bulimba	1941–1950	Expelled from the Labor Party in November 1941. Re-elected as an independent.
Lou Barnes	Cairns	1942–1947	
John Beals Chandler	Hamilton	1943	Formed the Queensland People's Party soon after election.
Louis Luckins	Maree	1944	Re-elected as an independent in 1944 after disputes with the new Queensland People's Party. Joined the QPP later that year.
Jim Houghton	Redcliffe	1960–1961, 1962	Elected as an independent. Joined the Liberal Party in 1961. Resigned to sit as an independent months later. Joined the Country Party in 1962.
Alf Muller	Fassifern	1961–1965	Resigned from the Country Party in 1961. Rejoined in 1965.
Arthur Coburn	Burdekin	1950–1969	
Bunny Adair	Cook	1961–1969	Refused to support the merger of the Queensland Labor Party into the Democratic Labor Party. Re-elected as an independent in 1963 and 1966.
Ted Walsh	Bundaberg	1961–1969	Refused to support the merger of the Queensland Labor Party into the Democratic Labor Party. Re-elected as an independent in 1963 and 1966.
Ed Casey	Mackay	1972–1977	Resigned from the Labor Party in 1972 after losing preselection for the 1972 election, re-elected as an independent in 1972 and 1974, readmitted to the Labor Party in 1977.
Lindsay Hartwig	Callide	1981–1986	Expelled from the National Party in 1981. Re-elected as an independent in 1983.
Liz Cunningham	Gladstone	1995–2015	
Dorothy Pratt	Nanango	1999–2012	Resigned from One Nation in February 1999, and was re-elected four times as an independent.
Peter Wellington	Nicklin	1998–2017	
John Kingston	Maryborough	1999–2003	Resigned from One Nation in February 1999. Re-elected as an independent in 2001.
Lex Bell	Surfers Paradise	2001–2004	Won by-election following resignation of former Premier Borbidge. Defeated at 2004 election.
Elisa Roberts	Gympie	2002–2006	Resigned from One Nation in April 2002. Re-elected as an independent in 2004. Defeated in 2006
Chris Foley	Maryborough	2003–2012	
Sandy Bolton	Noosa	2017–present	

===== Not elected as independent =====
Member	Electorate	Term	Notes
Frank Roberts	Nundah	1953–1956	Resigned from the Labor Party in 1953.
Tom Foley	Belyando	1956–1957	Expelled from the Labor Party in 1956. Joined the Queensland Labor Party in 1957.
Mick Gardner	Rockhampton	1956–1957	Expelled from the Labor Party in 1956. Joined the Queensland Labor Party in 1957.
Alex Dewar	Wavell	1968–1969	Resigned from the Liberal Party in August 1968.
Col Bennett	South Brisbane	1972	Lost Labor preselection in 1972 and expelled for running for re-election as an independent.
Merv Thackeray	Rockhampton North	1972	Lost Labor preselection in 1972 and expelled for running for re-election as an independent.
Lou Jensen	Bundaberg	1977	Resigned from the Labor Party after losing preselection for the 1977 election.
Col Miller	Ithaca	1984–1986	Resigned from the Liberal Party in August 1984.
Joe Kruger	Murrumba	1986	Resigned from the Labor Party in 1986 after losing preselection for the 1986 election.
Eric Shaw	Manly	1988–1989	Resigned from the Labor Party in September 1988 after losing preselection for the 1989 election.
Lin Powell	Isis	1989	Resigned from the National Party in June 1989.
Geoff Muntz	Whitsunday	1989	Resigned from the National Party in November 1989.
Shaun Nelson	Tablelands	1999–2001	Resigned from One Nation in February 1999.
Ken Turner	Thuringowa	1999–2001	Resigned from One Nation in February 1999.
Jeff Knuth	Burdekin	1999	Resigned from One Nation in February 1999. Founded the Country Party QLD in August 1999.
Jim Elder	Capalaba	2000–2001	Resigned from the Labor Party in November 2000 in the wake of the Shepherdson Inquiry
Grant Musgrove	Springwood	2000–2001	Resigned from the Labor Party in December 2000 in the wake of the Shepherdson Inquiry.
Mike Kaiser	Woodridge	2001	Resigned from the Labor Party in January 2001 in the wake of the Shepherdson Inquiry
Cate Molloy	Noosa	2006	Resigned from the Labor Party in August 2006 after losing preselection for the 2006 election
Aidan McLindon	Beaudesert	2010	Resigned from the Liberal National Party in May 2010 and sat as an independent until his new party, The Queensland Party, was formally registered in August
Rob Messenger	Burnett	2010–2012	Resigned from the Liberal National Party in May 2010. Defeated in 2012.
Alex Douglas	Gaven	2012–2013; 2014–2015	Resigned from the Liberal National Party in November 2012 and sat as an independent until joining the Palmer United Party in April 2013. Resigned from the Palmer United Party in August 2014 and again sat as an independent until his defeat in 2015
Carl Judge	Yeerongpilly	2012–2013; 2014–2015	Resigned from the Liberal National Party in November 2012 and sat as an independent until joining the Palmer United Party in April 2013. Resigned from the Palmer United Party in October 2014 and again sat as an independent until his defeat in 2015
Scott Driscoll	Redcliffe	2013	Suspended from the Liberal National Party in March 2013. Resigned from parliament in November 2013.
Billy Gordon	Cook	2015–2017	Expelled from the Labor Party in March 2015. Retired in 2017.
Rob Pyne	Cairns	2016–2017	Resigned from the Labor Party in March 2016. Defeated in 2017.
Rick Williams	Pumicestone	2017	Resigned from the Labor Party in October 2017 after being disendorsed for the 2017 election, at which he was then defeated as an independent.
Jimmy Sullivan	Stafford	2025–2026	Expelled from the Labor Party in May 2025. Died in 2026.

=== Western Australia ===
==== Western Australian Legislative Assembly ====
===== Won election as independent =====
Member	Electorate	Term	Notes
Jack Smith	Nelson	1921–1922	Joined the Country Party in September 1922.
John Boyland	Kalgoorlie	1921–1922	Independent Nationalist.
Frederick Warner	Mount Marshall	1933–1936	Independent Country. Joined the Country Party in 1936.
Clarence Doust	Nelson	1936–1939	
Thomas Hughes	East Perth	1936–1943	Independent Labor 1936–1939.
Harry Shearn	Maylands	1936–1951	Independent Nationalist 1936–1945, Independent Liberal 1945–1950.
Claude Barker	Irwin-Moore	1939	
Horace Berry	Irwin-Moore	1939–1947	
Lionel Kelly	Yilgarn-Coolgardie	1941–1946	Independent Country 1941–1943. Joined the Labor Party in July 1946.
Ray Owen	Swan	1944–1947	Independent Country until 1947.
William Read	Victoria Park	1945–1953	
David Grayden	Nedlands	1950–1953	
Noel Butcher	Gascoyne	1951–1953	Independent Liberal.
Bill Grayden	South Perth	1956–1959	Independent Liberal. Joined the Liberal Party in 1959.
Edward Oldfield	Mount Lawley	1956–1962	Independent Liberal.
Phillip Pendal	South Perth	1995–2005	Resigned from the Liberal Party in March 1995. Re-elected as an independent in 1997 and 2001.
Ernie Bridge	Kimberley	1996–2001	Resigned from the Labor Party in July 1996. Re-elected as an independent in 1997.
Larry Graham	Pilbara	2000–2005	Resigned from the Labor Party in February 2000. Re-elected as an independent in 2001.
Liz Constable	Floreat; Churchlands	1991–2013	
Janet Woollard	Alfred Cove	2001–2013	Member of Liberals for Forests in 2001, but stood as an independent due to party being unregistered.
John Bowler	Murchison-Eyre; Kalgoorlie	2006–2013	Expelled from the Labor Party in February 2006. Re-elected as an independent in 2008.

===== Not elected as independent =====
Member	Electorate	Term	Notes
Albert Wilson	Forrest	1906–1908	Resigned from the Labor Party in 1906 after being censured by the Labor caucus.
James Mann	Beverley	1949	Resigned from the Country Party in March 1949 and sat as an independent until joining the Liberal Party in May 1949.
Jack Skidmore	Swan	1981–1982	Resigned from the Labor Party in September 1981 after Brian Burke became leader.
Tom Dadour	Subiaco	1984–1986	Resigned from the Liberal Party in 1984 over policy differences.
Ian Thompson	Darling Range	1989–1993	Resigned from the Liberal Party in September 1989.
Pam Buchanan	Ashburton	1991–1992	Resigned from the Labor Party in February 1991 after being left out of the ministry. First female independent.
Ian Alexander	Perth	1991–1993	Resigned from the Labor Party in March 1991 over policy differences, joined the Greens after leaving parliament.
Frank Donovan	Morley	1991–1993	Resigned from the Labor Party in October 1991 over policy differences.
Bernie Masters	Vasse	2004–2005	Resigned from the Liberal Party in February 2004 after losing preselection for the 2005 election.
John D'Orazio	Ballajura	2006–2008, 2008	Expelled from the Labor Party in August 2006. Readmitted in April 2008. Resigned from the party in June 2008.
Sue Walker	Nedlands	2008	Resigned from the Liberal Party in February 2008.
Dan Sullivan	Leschenault	2008	Resigned from the Liberal Party in February 2008. Joined the Family First Party in June.
Bob Kucera	Yokine	2008	Resigned from the Labor Party in May 2008 after losing preselection for the 2008 election.
Paul Omodei	Warren-Blackwood	2008	Resigned from the Liberal Party in May 2008.
Adele Carles	Fremantle	2010–2013	Resigned from the Greens in May 2010.
Rob Johnson	Hillarys	2016–2017	Resigned from the Liberal Party in April 2016.
Barry Urban	Darling Range	2017–2018	Resigned from Labor Party in November 2017 after misleading Parliament, Resigned from Parliament in May 2018.

==== Western Australian Legislative Council ====
===== Won election as independent =====
Member	Electorate	Term	Notes
Joseph Holmes	North Province	1914–1942	
Cyril Cornish	North Province	1942–1946	
Reg Davies	North Metropolitan Region	1991–1997	Resigned from the Liberal Party in 1991. Re-elected in 1993. Defeated in 1996. Term expired 1997.

===== Not elected as independent =====
Member	Electorate	Term	Notes
Ron Thompson	South Metropolitan Region	1977–1980	Expelled from the Labor Party in 1977 after publicly opposing its policy on homosexuality.
Sam Piantadosi	North Metropolitan Region	1996	Resigned from the Labor Party in April 1996. Resigned from the Legislative Council in November to contest a Legislative Assembly seat at the 1996 election.
Mark Nevill	Mining and Pastoral	1999–2001	Resigned from the Labor Party in August 1999.
Tom Helm	Mining and Pastoral	2000–2001	Resigned from the Labor Party in July 2000 after losing preselection for the 2001 election.
Paddy Embry	South West	2003–2004	Resigned from One Nation in May 2003. Joined the New Country Party in 2004.
Alan Cadby	North Metropolitan	2004–2005	Resigned from the Liberal Party in June 2004 after losing preselection for the 2005 election.
John Fischer	Mining and Pastoral	2004–2005	Resigned from One Nation in June 2004.
Frank Hough	Agricultural	2004	Resigned from One Nation in June 2004. Sat as an independent until joining the New Country Party the same year.
Shelley Archer	Mining and Pastoral	2007–2008	Resigned from the Labor Party in November 2007.
Anthony Fels	Agricultural	2008	Resigned from the Liberal Party in July 2008. He sat as an independent for a period before recontesting that year's election as a Family First Party candidate.
Max Trenorden	Agricultural	2012–2013	Resigned from the National Party in late 2012 after losing preselection for the 2013 election.
Philip Gardiner	Agricultural	2012–2013	Resigned from the National Party in late 2012 in protest at Trenorden's preselection loss.
Charles Smith	East Metropolitan	2019–2020	Resigned from One Nation in June 2019, He joined the Western Australia Party in May 2020.
James Hayward	South West	2021–2023	Was elected as a member of the Nationals in 2021, resigned from The Nationals in 2021 after he was suspended from the party due to criminal sex charges being laid against him.
Ben Dawkins	South West	2023–2024	Was appointed to fill a vacancy in 2023 but was suspended and expelled from the Labor Party before he could take his position due to him breaching a violence order, he joined One Nation in 2024.

=== South Australia ===
==== South Australian House of Assembly ====
===== Won election as independent =====
Member	District	Term	Notes
Herbert Basedow	Barossa	1927–1930; 1933	
Thomas Thompson	Port Adelaide	1927, 1927–1930	Known as "Independent Protestant Labour".
Daniel Davies	Yorke Peninsula	1933–1941	
Tom Stott	Ridley	1933–1970	
George Connor	Alexandra	1934–1941	
Albert Robinson	Wooroora; Gouger	1934–1943	
Doug Bardolph	Adelaide	1935–1944	First elected as a Lang Labor Party MP in 1933, rejoined the Labor Party in the 1934 reconciliation, resigned to sit as an independent in 1935.
Herbert Dunn	Stirling	1938–1940	Joined the Liberal and Country League in 1940.
William Fisk	Glenelg	1938–1940	
John Fletcher	Mount Gambier	1938–1958	
George Illingworth	Goodwood	1938–1941	
Jules Langdon	Thebarton	1938–1942	
William Macgillivray	Chaffey	1938–1956	
John McLeay, senior	Unley	1938–1941	
Richard McKenzie	Murray	1938–1943	Joined the Labor Party in 1943.
Clement Smith	Victoria	1938–1941	
Percy Quirke	Burra	1948–1963	Resigned from the Labor Party in 1948. Joined the Liberal Party in 1963.
Ted Connelly	Pirie	1975–1977	
Norm Peterson	Semaphore	1979–1993	
Martyn Evans	Elizabeth	1984–1993	Joined the Labor Party in 1993.
Stan Evans	Davenport	1985–1986	Had won re-election as an independent in 1985 after losing Liberal preselection, but rejoined the Liberal Party in 1986.
Rory McEwen	Mount Gamber	1997–2010	
Mitch Williams	MacKillop	1997–1999	Joined the Liberal Party in 1999.
Peter Lewis	Hammond	2000–2006	Expelled from the Liberal Party in July 2000.
Bob Such	Fisher	2000–2014	Resigned from the Liberal Party in October 2000.
Kris Hanna	Mitchell	2006–2010	Had been re-elected as a Labor MP in 2002, joined the Greens in 2003, and resigned to sit as an independent before the 2006 election.
Geoff Brock	Frome/Stuart	2009–present	Originally to elected to Frome in 2009 he transferred to Stuart in 2022 after a redistribution.
Don Pegler	Mount Gambier	2010–2014	
Frances Bedford	Florey	2017–2022	Originally elected as a Labor MP in 1997, she became an independent in 2017 after losing Labor pre-selection, Lost seat after trying to Newland in 2022.
Troy Bell	Mount Gambier	2017–2025	Resigned from the Liberal Party in August 2017 due to criminal charges.
Dan Cregan	Kavel	2021–2026	Resigned from Liberal Party in October due to disagreements with the government.
Fraser Ellis	Narungga	2021–2026	Lost preselection and resigned from the Liberal Party in 2021 after corruption findings.

===== Not elected as independent =====
Member	District	Term	Notes
E. H. Coombe	Barossa	1910–1912	Refused to sign the Liberal Union pledge when his party merged into it in 1910
Clarence Goode	Victoria	1918	Resigned from the National Party in 1918 after losing preselection to recontest his seat
Maurice Parish	Murray	1918	Resigned from the National Party in 1918 after losing preselection to recontest his seat
Crawford Vaughan	East Torrens	1918	Resigned from the National Party in 1918
John Albert Southwood	East Torrens	1920–1921	Resigned from the National Party in 1920
Terry Groom	Hartley	1991–1993	Resigned from the Labor Party in 1991 after losing preselection to recontest his seat
Murray De Laine	Price	2001–2002	Resigned from the Labor Party in August 2001 after losing preselection to recontest his seat
Ralph Clarke	Ross Smith	2001–2002	Resigned from the Labor Party in November 2001 after losing preselection to recontest his seat
Martin Hamilton-Smith	Waite	2014–2018	Resigned from the Liberal Party in May 2014.
Duncan McFetridge	Morphett	2017–2018	Resigned from the Liberal Party in May 2017.
Sam Duluk	Waite	2020–2022	Resigned from the Liberal Party in February 2020. Lost re-election
Nick McBride	Mackillop	2023–2026	Resigned from the Liberal Party in July 2023.

==== South Australian Legislative Council ====
===== Won election as independent =====
Member	District	Term	Notes
Joseph Anderson	Central No. 1	1931–1944	
Alec Bagot	Southern	1938–1941	
Frank Halleday	Southern	1938–1943	
Nick Xenophon	South Australia	1997–2007	
Ann Bressington	South Australia	2006–2014	Elected on an independent No Pokies ticket.
John Darley	South Australia	2007–2022	Appointed to a casual vacancy following the resignation of Independent No Pokies MLC Nick Xenophon. Re-elected on an independent Nick Xenophon Team ticket in 2014. Became purely independent in 2017.

===== Not elected as independent =====
Member	District	Term	Notes
James Wilson	Central No. 1	1915–1918	Expelled from the United Labor Party in 1915, sat as an independent until joining National Labor in 1917.
Frederick Wallis	Central No. 2	1918–1921	Expelled from Australian Labor Party in 1918.
Alfred von Doussa	Southern	1921	The Liberal Union refused to accept his preselection nomination for the 1921 election.
Stanley Whitford	Central No. 1	1934–1941	Resigned from the Parliamentary Labor Party in March 1934.
Norm Foster	South Australia	1982	Resigned from the Labor Party in June 1982 to support the construction of the Olympic Dam.
Terry Cameron	South Australia	1998–1999, 2002–2006	Resigned from the Labor Party to support the sale of ETSA in August 1998. Founded the SA First party in March 1999. Disbanded party and returned to sitting as an independent in 2002. Defeated in 2006.
Trevor Crothers	South Australia	1999–2002	Resigned from the Labor Party to support the sale of ETSA in June 1999. Defeated in 2002.
David Winderlich	South Australia	2009–2010	Resigned from the Australian Democrats in October 2009. Defeated in 2010.
Bernard Finnigan	South Australia	2011–2015	Expelled from the Labor Party in May 2011 following his being charged with child pornography offences. Resigned from parliament in 2015.
Frank Pangallo	South Australia	2023–2025	Left SA Best after disagreements with party leader.
Tammy Franks	South Australia	2025–2026	Left the Greens in May 2025.
Jing Lee	South Australia	2025	Resigned from the Liberal Party in January 2025.
Sarah Game	South Australia	2025	Left One Nation in 2025.

=== Tasmania ===
==== Lower House ====
===== Won election as independent =====
Member	Electorate	Term	Notes
Kristie Johnston	Clark	2021–present	
David O'Byrne	Franklin	2024–present	Resigned from Labor in 2024 before being elected as an independent at the state election later that year.
Craig Garland	Braddon	2024–present	
Peter George	Franklin	2025–present	

===== Not elected as independent =====
Member	Electorate	Term	Notes
John Tucker	Lyons	2023–2024	Resigned from the Liberal Party in May 2023 over stadium saga.
Lara Alexander	Bass	2023–2024	Resigned from the Liberal Party in May 2023 over stadium saga.
Elise Archer	Clark	2023	Ousted from the Liberal Party in September 2023 after bullying allegations and stood down from parliament in the October.

==== Upper house ====
- Rosemary Armitage
- Robert Armstrong
- Ivan Dean
- Kerry Finch
- Ruth Forrest
- Mike Gaffney
- Greg Hall
- Tony Mulder
- Tania Rattray
- Adriana Taylor
- Rob Valentine
- Jim Wilkinson

=== Australian Capital Territory ===
==== Australian Capital Territory Legislative Assembly ====
===== Won election as independent =====
Member	Electorate	Term	Notes
Michael Moore	Molonglo	1989–2001	Resigned from Residents Rally in October 1989. Re-elected on the "Moore Independents Group" ticket in 1992, 1995 and 1998.
Helen Szuty	None	1992–1995	Elected on the "Moore Independents Group" ticket in 1992 and sat as an independent. Defeated in 1995.
Paul Osborne	Brindabella	1995–2001	Elected on the "Osborne Independents Group" ticket in 1995 and re-elected in 1998. Defeated in 2001.
Dave Rugendyke	Ginninderra	1998–2001	Elected on the "Osborne Independents Group" ticket in 1998. Defeated in 2001.
Thomas Emerson	Kurrajong	2024–present	Elected on the "Independents for Canberra" ticket in 2024.
Fiona Carrick	Murrumbidgee	2024–present	Elected on the "Fiona Carrick Independent" ticket in 2024.

===== Not elected as independent =====
Member	Electorate	Term	Notes
Robyn Nolan	None	1991	Resigned from the Liberal Party in October 1991. Formed the New Conservative Group in November.
Trevor Kaine	Brindabella	1998	Resigned from the Liberal Party in May 1998. Formed the United Canberra Party in July.
Helen Cross	Molonglo	2002–2004	Expelled from the Liberal Party in September 2002. Defeated as "Helen Cross Independents" in 2004.
Richard Mulcahy	Molonglo	2007–2008	Expelled from the Liberal Party in December 2007. Formed the Richard Mulcahy Canberra Party in August 2008.

=== Northern Territory ===
==== Northern Territory Legislative Assembly ====
===== Won election as independent =====
Member	Electorate	Term	Notes
Dawn Lawrie	Nightcliff	1974–1983	
Ron Withnall	Port Darwin	1974–1977	
Denis Collins	Sadadeen; Greatorex	1986–1994	Lost CLP preselection in 1986 and re-elected as an independent in 1987 and 1990. Defeated in 1994.
Noel Padgham-Purich	Koolpinyah; Nelson	1987–1997	Lost CLP preselection for the 1987 election and re-elected as an independent in 1987, 1990 and 1994
Loraine Braham	Braitling	2001–2008	Resigned from the CLP in 2001 after losing preselection, and re-elected as an independent in 2001 and 2005
Gerry Wood	Nelson	2001–2020	
Robyn Lambley	Araluen	2015–present	Resigned from the CLP in June 2015. Re-elected as an independent in 2016
Kezia Purick	Goyder	2015–2024	Resigned from the CLP in July 2015. Re-elected as an independent in 2016
Yingiya Mark Guyula	Nhulunbuy/Mulka	2016–2026	
Terry Mills	Blain	2016–2020	

===== Not elected as independent =====
Member	Electorate	Term	Notes
Rod Oliver	Alice Springs	1979–1980	Resigned from the CLP in August 1979
Ian Tuxworth	Barkly	1986	Expelled from the CLP in December 1986. Founded the Northern Territory Nationals two weeks later
Col Firmin	Ludmilla	1990	Lost CLP preselection for the 1990 election
Max Ortmann	Brennan	1994	Lost CLP preselection for the 1994 election
Peter Maley	Goyder	2005	Expelled from the CLP in May 2005
Marion Scrymgour	Arafura	2009	Resigned from the ALP in June 2009. Rejoined the party in August.
Alison Anderson	MacDonnell; Namatjira	2009–2011, 2014, 2014–2016	Resigned from the ALP in August 2009 and sat as an independent before joining the CLP in September 2011. Re-elected as a CLP member in 2012. Resigned from the CLP in April 2014 and sat as an independent for two weeks before joining the Palmer United Party. Resigned from the PUP in November 2014 and again sat as an independent.
Ross Bohlin	Drysdale	2012	Lost CLP preselection for the 2012 election
Francis Xavier Kurrupuwu	Arafura	2014	Resigned from the CLP in April 2014. Rejoined the party in September.
Larisa Lee	Arnhem	2014–2016	Resigned from the CLP in April 2014 and sat as an independent before joining the Palmer United Party two weeks later. Resigned from the PUP in November 2014 and again sat as an independent.
Delia Lawrie	Karama	2014–2016	Resigned from the ALP in October 2015 after losing preselection for the 2016 election.
Nathan Barrett	Blain	2016	Resigned from the CLP
Mark Turner	Blain	2023–2024	Expelled from Labor Party in June 2023.

== Independents with party affiliation ==
=== Federal ===
==== House of Representatives ====
Member	Electorate	Party	Term	Notes
Dai Le	Fowler	Independent – Western Sydney Community	2023–present	Founded party in 2023 but continues to sit as an independent in parliament

==== Senate ====
Member	Electorate	Party	Term	Notes
David Pocock	ACT	Independent – David Pocock	2022–present	Elected with David Pocock party ticket but sits as an independent.

=== State and territory ===
==== Victoria ====
===== Legislative Assembly =====
Member	Electorate	Party	Term	Notes
Will Fowles	Ringwood	Independent Labor	2023–2024	Removed from party room due to criminal investigation.

==== Western Australia ====
===== Legislative Council =====
Member	Electorate	Party	Term	Notes
Wilson Tucker	Mining and Pastoral Region	Independent – Daylight Saving Party	2023–2025	Party deregistered due to new laws in 2023, Wilson Tucker is still a party member, and just sits as an independent.

== Transparency ==
In federal and many state elections, there is no requirement for independent candidates to reveal if they are a member of a political party.

An analysis from the ABC found that over 10% of independents in the 2024 Queensland local elections were members of a political party.

Analysis from The Age found that a large percentage of independent candidates in the 2024 Victorian local elections were members of a political party.

== See also ==
- Independent politician (Ireland)
