= Electoral division of Murchison =

Tasmanian Legislative Council electoral division

Murchison Tasmania—Legislative Council
- Map showing the electoral division of Murchison, as of the 2017 periodic review.
- State: Tasmania
- Created: 1999
- MP: Ruth Forrest
- Party: Independent
- Namesake: Mount Murchison
- Electors: 27,059 (January 2019)
- Area: 19,391 km^{2} (7,486.9 sq mi)
- Demographic: Rural
- Federal electorate(s): Braddon
- Coordinates: 41.665°S 145.348°E
Electorates around Murchison:
Southern Ocean	Bass Strait	Bass Strait
Southern Ocean	Murchison	Montgomery; McIntyre; Derwent
Southern Ocean	Southern Ocean	Huon

The electoral division of Murchison is one of the fifteen electorates in the Tasmanian Legislative Council, situated in the western/north-west region of the state. It is the largest electorate in size, covering an area of 19,391 km² and includes the municipalities of Circular Head, King Island, Waratah-Wynyard, West Coast and part of Burnie City.

Ruth Forrest has been the sitting member for Murchison since 2005, she ran unopposed in 2011, and was re-elected in 2017 and 2023. The next scheduled election is in 2029. As of January 2019, there were 27,059 enrolled voters.

== History ==
The seat of Murchison was created in the redistribution of 1999, and largely replaced the west coast seat of Russell, which had existed since 1885. The electorate is named after Mount Murchison near Rosebery and the Murchison River (Tasmania) which flows through the region.

== Members ==
The elected members for the seat of Murchison have all sat as independents, including those for the former seat of Russell.

Member	Party	Period
Tony Fletcher	Independent	1999–2005
Ruth Forrest	Independent	2005–present

== Election results ==
2023 Tasmanian Legislative Council periodic elections: Murchison
Party	Candidate	Votes	%	±%
Independent	Ruth Forrest	16,542	71.88	+15.20
Shooters, Fishers, Farmers	Brenton Jones	3,098	13.46	+13.46
Independent	Codie Hutchison	2,508	10.90	+10.90
Independent	Gatty Burnett	865	3.76	+3.76
Total formal votes		23,013	96.09	−0.59
Informal votes		936	3.91	+0.59
Turnout		23,949	85.19	+0.79
Registered electors		28,114		
Independent hold				

== See also ==
- Tasmanian House of Assembly
