= Electoral division of Rumney =

Tasmanian Legislative Council electoral division

Rumney Tasmania—Legislative Council
- Map showing the electoral division of Rumney, as of the 2017 periodic review.
- State: Tasmania
- Created: 1999
- MP: Sarah Lovell
- Party: Labor
- Namesake: Mount Rumney
- Electors: 27,606 (May 2023)
- Area: 434 km^{2} (167.6 sq mi)
- Demographic: Outer-metropolitan
- Federal electorate(s): Franklin; Lyons
- Coordinates: 42.830°S 147.439°E
Electorates around Rumney:
Derwent	Prosser	Prosser
River Derwent; Pembroke	Rumney	Prosser; River Derwent
River Derwent	River Derwent	River Derwent

The electoral division of Rumney is one of the 15 electoral divisions in the Tasmanian Legislative Council (upper house). The division is located in Southern Tasmania to the east of the division of Pembroke.

The electorate is named after Mount Rumney in outer Hobart. The division covers an area of 434 km^{2} and includes a number of outer Hobart localities including; Lauderdale, Rokeby, Cambridge, Midway Point and Richmond. The division is held by Labor member Sarah Lovell.

As of the last election on the 6 May 2023, the division had a total enrolment of 27,606 electors.

== Members ==
Member	Party	Period
Lin Thorp	Labor	1999–2011
Tony Mulder	Independent	2011–2017
Sarah Lovell	Labor	2017–present

== Election results ==
2023 Tasmanian Legislative Council periodic elections: Rumney
Party	Candidate	Votes	%	±%
Labor	Sarah Lovell	11,003	49.97	+16.20
Liberal	Gregory Brown	5,838	26.51	+26.51
Independent	Tony Mulder	3,760	17.08	−9.77
Shooters, Fishers, Farmers	Adrian Pickin	1,417	6.44	−0.70
Total formal votes		22,018	96.81	+0.71
Informal votes		726	3.19	−0.71
Turnout		22,744	82.39	
Registered electors		27,606		
After distribution of preferences
Labor	Sarah Lovell	11,453	52.02	−0.24
Liberal	Gregory Brown	6,221	28.25	+28.25
Independent	Tony Mulder	4,344	19.73	−8.01
Labor hold				

== See also ==
- Tasmanian House of Assembly
