= George Ritchie (politician) =

Australian politician (1864–1944)

Sir George Ritchie KCMG (14 December 1864 – 7 August 1944) was a South Australian politician. During his parliamentary career he held every ministerial position and was a minister in both Houses, a feat rarely equalled.

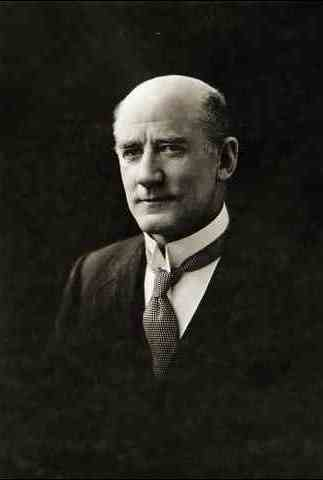
George Ritchie (politician) 1926

== History ==
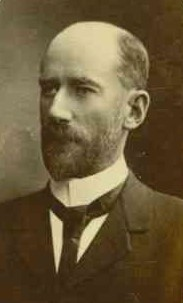
George Ritchie ca. 1902

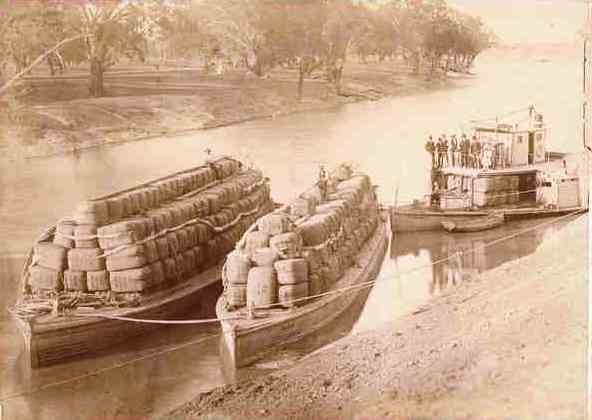
PS Pioneer and barges on River Murray ca. 1918

Ritchie was the third son of Captain James Ritchie (1832 – 23 April 1881) and his wife Alison (12 August 1829 – 20 February 1913). Captain James Ritchie, and five others left Scotland for Australia in the early 1850s sailing the Lioness, a 75-ton River Mersey steamer for Captain Cadell, then became a shipowner trading on the River Murray and Murrumbidgee, when his name was as familiar as those of William Randell and Cadell. One of his feats was to captain the Gundagai, a river boat of 129 feet length, to New Zealand with gold to finance the Maori war. Ritchie was born at Goolwa in 1864, was educated at the Echuca Grammar School, and after four years' apprenticeship with a draper, joined his father on the river. In 1884, two years after his father's death, he entered into partnership with his two brothers as a steamboat owner on the Murray. Their first ship was the Pioneer. He bought his brothers out a few years later, and in the course of his 40 years of active trading on the river, he owned about a dozen boats. When the districts of Encounter Bay, Mount Barker and Noarlunga were amalgamated to form the district of Alexandra, Ritchie was elected to the House of Assembly as one of its members.

He was a member for Alexandra from 1902 to 1922, when he resigned to contest the Angas seat in the Federal Parliament. He was defeated, and in 1924 re-entered State Parliament as a member for the Northern District in the Legislative Council, serving from 1924 to 1944. In 1914 he was appointed Minister for Water Supply, serving until 1917. His subsequent appointments were Minister of Agriculture (1917, 1919), Minister of Railways (1919–1920), Treasurer of South Australia (1920–1922), Minister of Education and Afforestation (1933–1938), Minister of Mines (1933–1939), and Minister of Health (1935–1939) He was Commissioner of Public Works in 1914 and 1919. He was Chief Secretary from 1933 to 1939, a post he relinquished after an accident. He never attained the highest office in the State, although he saw 12 premiers come and go during his parliamentary career. On the few occasions he acted as Premier, Ritchie handled the responsibility with thoroughness and care, tempered with a kindly manner, and at times whimsical humour. Lyell McEwin succeeded him as Chief Secretary.

== Other interests ==
- He was three years as Mayor of Goolwa prior to entering parliament, and was an active worker for institutes.
- He was owner and skipper of several River Murray steamboats, including the short-lived excursion steamers Augusta and Venus.
- He was deputy chairman of the State Centenary Executive Committee and chairman of the Centenary country organisation committee.
- He became an alderman of the Adelaide City Council in 1932, but had to resign due to pressure of parliamentary duties.
- He was active in the voluntary militia during the Russian scare towards the end of the 19th century.
- He was for some years Chief of the Caledonian Society.

== Publications ==
- Ritchie, George Lecture on the River Murray, past and present: the Mississippi of Australia Reprinted from Royal Geographical Society of S.A., 22nd Vol. (Delivered before the Society on 20 December 1920) 8pp., Mail Newspapers, Adelaide 1923

== Family ==
Ritchie's brother, David J. Ritchie, of Goolwa, married Violet Mayfield on 16 April 1903. In 1922 he purchased the historic paddle steamer Cadell, which had lain derelict on a Port Pirie beach for five years. Two other brothers, James and John, were riverboat captains. His sister Margaret Annie "Maggie" Ritchie married Thomas Goode, eldest son of Thomas Goode sen. on 27 November 1901.

In 1899 Ritchie married Charlotte Knapman, daughter of William Knapman of Port Adelaide. Among their children were:

- Colin Ritchie of "Montillie", Port Lincoln
- Bruce Ritchie, of "Coolibah", Port Lincoln

He collapsed and died while assisting the gardener at his home in Flinders Street, Kent Town. His remains were buried at the Currency Creek cemetery.

== Recognition ==
Ritchie was knighted K.C.M.G. in June 1935 while Acting Premier in the absence of Richard Butler.

Political offices
Preceded by Richard Butler	Commissioner of Public Works; 1914 – 1915	Succeeded by Harry Jackson
Preceded by John Bice	Commissioner of Public Works; 1919 – 1920	Succeeded by William Hague
