= Electoral results for the Division of Huon =

This is a list of electoral results for the electoral division of Huon in Tasmanian Legislative Council elections since 2005, when candidate political affiliations were first recorded in the official record.

== Members ==
| Member | Party | Period |
|---|---|---|
| Thomas Knight | Independent | 1856–1857 |
| Richard Cleburne | Independent | 1857–1864 |
| Alexander Kissock | Independent | 1864–1866 |
| John Wedge | Independent | 1866–1868 |
| John Foster | Independent | 1868–1874 |
| James Robertson | Independent | 1874–1880 |
| Joseph Solomon | Independent | 1880 |
| William Fisher | Independent | 1881–1882 |
| John Watchorn | Independent | 1882–1905 |
| Thomas Fisher | Independent | 1905–1909 |
| Stafford Bird | Independent | 1909–1924 |
| David Calvert | Independent | 1924 |
| William Calvert | Independent | 1924–1942 |
| Rowland Worsley | Labor | 1942–1948 |
| Ron Brown | Independent | 1948–1966 |
| Michael Hodgman | Independent | 1966–1974 |
| Peter Hodgman | Independent | 1974–1986 |
| Athol Meyer | Independent | 1986–1996 |
| Paul Harriss | Independent | 1996–2014 |
| Robert Armstrong | Independent | 2014–2020 |
| Bastian Seidel | Labor | 2020–2022 |
| Dean Harriss | Independent | 2022– |

== Election results ==
=== Elections in the 2020s ===
==== 2022 ====
2022 Huon state by-election
| Party | Candidate | Votes | % | ±% |
|---|---|---|---|---|
| Labor | Toby Thorpe | 5,648 | 25.05 | −6.24 |
| Independent | Dean Harriss | 5,340 | 23.68 | +7.54 |
| Liberal | Aldo Antolli | 5,111 | 22.66 | +22.66 |
| Greens | Gideon Cordover | 4,704 | 20.86 | +3.32 |
| Local | Pat Caplice | 1,748 | 7.75 | +7.75 |
| Total formal votes | | 22,551 | 97.35 | −0.09 |
| Informal votes | | 615 | 2.65 | +0.09 |
| Turnout | | 23,166 | 86.20 | +0.64 |
| Registered electors | | 26,876 | | |
Two-candidate-preferred result
| Independent | Dean Harriss | 11,840 | 52.55 | +52.55 |
| Labor | Toby Thorpe | 10,693 | 47.45 | −9.86 |
| Independent gain from Labor | | Swing | N/A | |

==== 2020 ====
2020 Tasmanian Legislative Council periodic elections: Huon
| Party | Candidate | Votes | % | ±% |
|---|---|---|---|---|
| Labor | Bastian Seidel | 6,795 | 31.29 | +31.29 |
| Independent | Robert Armstrong | 4,071 | 18.75 | −1.65 |
| Greens | Pat Caruana | 3,808 | 17.54 | +17.54 |
| Independent | Dean Harriss | 3,506 | 16.14 | +16.14 |
| Independent | Debbie Armstrong | 1,784 | 8.22 | +8.22 |
| Shooters, Fishers, Farmers | Garrick Cameron | 1,752 | 8.07 | +8.07 |
| Total formal votes | | 21,716 | 97.44 | +1.67 |
| Informal votes | | 571 | 2.56 | −1.67 |
| Turnout | | 22,287 | 85.56 | +0.39 |
| Registered electors | | 26,048 | | |
Two-candidate-preferred result
| Labor | Bastian Seidel | 12,284 | 57.31 | +57.31 |
| Independent | Robert Armstrong | 9,152 | 42.69 | −14.19 |
| Labor gain from Independent | | | | |

=== Elections in the 2010s ===
==== 2014 ====
Tasmanian Legislative Council periodic elections, 2014: Huon
| Party | Candidate | Votes | % | ±% |
|---|---|---|---|---|
| Liberal | Peter Hodgman | 5,387 | 26.13 | +26.13 |
| Independent | Robert Armstrong | 4,205 | 20.40 | +20.40 |
| Independent | Liz Smith | 3,974 | 19.28 | +19.28 |
| Independent | Jimmy Bell | 3,177 | 15.41 | +15.41 |
| Independent | Rodney Dillon | 1,690 | 8.20 | +8.20 |
| Independent | Pavel Ruzicka | 1,312 | 6.36 | +6.36 |
| Independent | Helen Lane | 871 | 4.22 | +4.22 |
| Total formal votes | | 20,616 | 95.76 | −0.56 |
| Informal votes | | 912 | 4.24 | +0.56 |
| Turnout | | 21,528 | 85.17 | +2.32 |
Two-candidate-preferred result
| Independent | Robert Armstrong | 10,703 | 56.88 | +56.88 |
| Liberal | Peter Hodgman | 8,113 | 43.12 | +43.12 |
| Independent hold | | Swing | | |

=== Elections in the 2000s ===
==== 2008 ====
Tasmanian Legislative Council periodic elections, 2008: Huon
| Party | Candidate | Votes | % | ±% |
|---|---|---|---|---|
| Independent | Paul Harriss | 12,149 | 62.04 | +12.61 |
| Greens | Mark Rickards | 7,435 | 37.96 | +37.96 |
| Total formal votes | | 19,584 | 96.32 | −1.31 |
| Informal votes | | 748 | 4.68 | +1.31 |
| Turnout | | 20,332 | 82.86 | −4.75 |
| Independent hold | | Swing | | |
