= Members of the Tasmanian Legislative Council, 2023–2029 =

This is a list of members of the Tasmanian Legislative Council between 2023 and 2029. Terms of the Legislative Council did not coincide with Legislative Assembly elections, and members served six year terms, with a number of members facing election each year.

== Elections ==
Date	Electorates
6 May 2023	Launceston; Murchison; Rumney
4 May 2024	Hobart; Prosser; Elwick (by-election)
24 May 2025	Montgomery; Nelson; Pembroke
2 May 2026	Huon; Rosevears
2027	Derwent; Mersey; Windermere
2028	Elwick; McIntyre

== Members ==
Name	Party	Division	Term in office
Hon Rosemary Armitage^{[1]}	Independent	Launceston	2011–present
Hon Nick Duigan	Liberal	Windermere	2021–present
Hon Luke Edmunds^{[4]}	Labor	Pembroke	2022–present
Hon Craig Farrell	Labor	Derwent	2011–present
Hon Ruth Forrest^{[1]}	Independent	Murchison	2005–present
Hon Mike Gaffney	Independent	Mersey	2009–present
Hon Clare Glade-Wright^{[5]}	Independent	Huon	2026–present
Hon Dean Harriss^{[5]}	Independent	Huon	2022–2026
Hon Casey Hiscutt^{[4]}	Independent	Montgomery	2025–present
Hon Leonie Hiscutt^{[4]}	Liberal	Montgomery	2013–2025
Hon Jane Howlett^{[2]}	Liberal	Prosser	2018–2024
Hon Sarah Lovell^{[1]}	Labor	Rumney	2017–present
Hon Cassy O'Connor^{[3]}	Greens	Hobart	2024–present
Hon Jo Palmer	Liberal	Rosevears	2020–present
Hon Tania Rattray	Independent	Apsley/McIntyre	2004–present
Hon Bec Thomas	Independent	Elwick	2024–present
Hon Rob Valentine	Independent	Hobart	2012–2024
Hon Kerry Vincent^{[3]}	Liberal	Prosser	2024–present
Hon Meg Webb^{[4]}	Independent	Nelson	2019–present
Hon Josh Willie^{[2]}	Labor	Elwick	2016–2024

^{1} At the 2023 Tasmanian Legislative Council periodic election independent MLC's Rosemary Armitage (Launceston) and Ruth Forrest (Murchison) and Labor MLC Sarah Lovell (Rumney) were re-elected.
^{2} On 27 February 2024 Liberal MLC Jane Howlett (Prosser) and Labor MLC Josh Willie (Elwick) resigned to contest the 2024 Tasmanian state election.
^{3} At the 2024 Tasmanian Legislative Council periodic election independent MLC Rob Valentine (Hobart) retired. Former Greens MP for Denison and Clark Cassy O'Connor (Hobart) won election as the Greens candidate as did Liberal candidate Kerry Vincent (Prosser) and Independent candidate Bec Thomas (Elwick).
^{4} At the 2025 Tasmanian Legislative Council periodic election Liberal MLC Leonie Hiscutt (Montgomery) retired. Independent MLC Meg Webb (Nelson) and Labor MLC Luke Edmunds (Pembroke) won re-election and Independent candidate Casey Hiscutt (Montgomery) won election.
^{5} At the 2026 Tasmanian Legislative Council periodic election Liberal MLC Jo Palmer (Rosevears) was re-elected while independent candidate Clare Glade-Wright (Huon) defeated independent MLC Dean Harriss (Huon).

== Sources ==
- Parliament of Tasmania (2024).
