= 2014 Tasmanian Legislative Council periodic election =

Legislative election in Tasmania, Australia

- 3 May 2014

2 of the 15 seats in the Legislative Council 8 seats needed for a majority
	First party
Party	Independent
Seats before	2
Seats won	2
Seat change	Steady

Periodic elections for the Tasmanian Legislative Council were held on 3 May 2014. The two seats up for election were the electoral division of Huon and the electoral division of Rosevears. These seats were last contested in 2008.

== Huon ==
Independent MLC Paul Harriss held Huon from 1996. In 2014, Harriss resigned from the Legislative Council to successfully contest the Tasmanian House of Assembly seat of Franklin as a Liberal candidate at the 2014 state election. The favourite prior to the election was Peter Hodgman, the uncle of Premier Will Hodgman who had previously held the seat as an independent from 1974 to 1986 before serving in the House of Assembly as a Liberal from 1986 to 2001. Hodgman was running as a Liberal candidate. His highest profile opponent was Huon Valley Mayor Robert Armstrong, running as an independent. Other candidates included Liz Smith, a Huon Valley councillor who resigned from the Greens to run as an independent; Jimmy Bell, the manager of the Huon Valley Police and Citizens Youth Club; Rodney Dillon, an Amnesty International worker who was the 2013 Tasmanian Humanitarian of the Year; Pavel Ruzicka, a sawmiller; and Helen Lane.

=== Huon Results ===
Tasmanian Legislative Council periodic elections, 2014: Huon
Party	Candidate	Votes	%	±%
Liberal	Peter Hodgman	5,387	26.13	+26.13
Independent	Robert Armstrong	4,205	20.40	+20.40
Independent	Liz Smith	3,974	19.28	+19.28
Independent	Jimmy Bell	3,177	15.41	+15.41
Independent	Rodney Dillon	1,690	8.20	+8.20
Independent	Pavel Ruzicka	1,312	6.36	+6.36
Independent	Helen Lane	871	4.22	+4.22
Total formal votes		20,616	95.76	−0.56
Informal votes		912	4.24	+0.56
Turnout		21,528	85.17	+2.32
Two-candidate-preferred result
Independent	Robert Armstrong	10,703	56.88	+56.88
Liberal	Peter Hodgman	8,113	43.12	+43.12
Independent hold		Swing		

== Rosevears ==
Independent MLC Kerry Finch has represented Rosevears since 2002. He re-contested the seat. The Liberal Party endorsed Don Morris, a long-time political staffer and former Senate candidate, in a break from their tradition of not challenging sitting independents. The Liberal Party targeted Finch as a "closet Green" regarding his left-leaning voting record. No other candidates nominated.

=== Rosevears Results ===
Tasmanian Legislative Council periodic elections, 2014: Rosevears
Party	Candidate	Votes	%	±%
Independent	Kerry Finch	11,840	60.28	−12.37
Liberal	Don Morris	7,801	39.72	+39.72
Total formal votes		19,641	96.43	+1.12
Informal votes		728	3.57	−1.12
Turnout		20,369	81.32	+1.16
Independent hold		Swing	−12.37	
