= Electoral results for the Division of Rosevears =

This is a list of electoral results for the electoral division of Rosevears in Tasmanian Legislative Council elections since 2005, when candidate political affiliations were first recorded in the official record.

== Members ==
Member	Party	Period
Ray Bailey	Independent	1999–2002
Kerry Finch	Independent	2002–2020
Jo Palmer	Liberal	2020–present

== Election results ==
=== Elections in the 2020s ===
==== 2020 ====
2020 Tasmanian Legislative Council periodic elections: Rosevears
Party	Candidate	Votes	%	±%
Liberal	Jo Palmer	9,492	41.52	+1.80
Independent	Janie Finlay	6,915	30.24	+30.24
Labor	Jess Greene	2,076	9.08	+9.08
Independent	David Fry	1,907	8.34	+8.34
Greens	Jack Davenport	1,713	7.49	+7.49
Independent	Vivienne Gale	761	3.33	+3.33
Total formal votes		22,864	98.02	+1.59
Informal votes		462	1.98	−1.59
Turnout		23,326	84.81	+3.49
Registered electors		27,503		
Two-candidate-preferred result
Liberal	Jo Palmer	11,492	50.57	+10.85
Independent	Janie Finlay	11,232	49.43	+49.43
Liberal gain from Independent				

=== Elections in the 2010s ===
==== 2014 ====
Tasmanian Legislative Council periodic elections, 2014: Rosevears
Party	Candidate	Votes	%	±%
Independent	Kerry Finch	11,840	60.28	−12.37
Liberal	Don Morris	7,801	39.72	+39.72
Total formal votes		19,641	96.43	+1.12
Informal votes		728	3.57	−1.12
Turnout		20,369	81.32	+1.16
Independent hold		Swing	−12.37	

=== Elections in the 2000s ===
==== 2008 ====
Tasmanian Legislative Council periodic elections, 2008: Rosevears
Party	Candidate	Votes	%	±%
Independent	Kerry Finch	12,990	72.66	+45.43
Independent	Colin O'Brien	4,889	27.34	+27.34
Total formal votes		17,879	95.30	−0.75
Informal votes		881	4.70	+0.75
Turnout		18,760	80.16	−5.97
Independent hold		Swing	+21.87	
