= 2020 Tasmanian Legislative Council periodic election =

Legislative election in Tasmania, Australia

- 1 August 2020

2 of the 15 seats in the Legislative Council 8 seats needed for a majority
	First party	Second party	Third party
Party	Liberal	Labor	Independent
Seats before	0	0	2
Seats won	1	1	0
Seat change	▲1	▲1	▼2
- Results by electoral division

Periodic elections for the Tasmanian Legislative Council were held on 1 August 2020. They were initially planned for 30 May; however, due to the COVID-19 pandemic, the electoral commission delayed the date of the election until August, in anticipation for the next Legislative Council sitting date on 25 August.

The two seats up for election were Huon and Rosevears. They were previously contested in 2014.

== Huon ==
Location of Huon in Tasmania

The seat of Huon was held by independent Robert Armstrong. He first won the seat in the 2014 election. Armstrong recontested the seat, and one of his challengers was his great niece, Debbie. The seat was won by Labor candidate Bastian Seidel.

=== Huon Results ===
2020 Tasmanian Legislative Council periodic elections: Huon
Party	Candidate	Votes	%	±%
Labor	Bastian Seidel	6,795	31.29	+31.29
Independent	Robert Armstrong	4,071	18.75	−1.65
Greens	Pat Caruana	3,808	17.54	+17.54
Independent	Dean Harriss	3,506	16.14	+16.14
Independent	Debbie Armstrong	1,784	8.22	+8.22
Shooters, Fishers, Farmers	Garrick Cameron	1,752	8.07	+8.07
Total formal votes		21,716	97.44	+1.67
Informal votes		571	2.56	−1.67
Turnout		22,287	85.56	+0.39
Registered electors		26,048		
Two-candidate-preferred result
Labor	Bastian Seidel	12,284	57.31	+57.31
Independent	Robert Armstrong	9,152	42.69	−14.19
Labor gain from Independent				

== Rosevears ==
Location of Rosevears in Tasmania

The seat of Rosevears was held by independent candidate Kerry Finch. He was first elected in the 2002 election, but he did not recontest. The seat was won by Liberal candidate Jo Palmer.

=== Rosevears Results ===
2020 Tasmanian Legislative Council periodic elections: Rosevears
Party	Candidate	Votes	%	±%
Liberal	Jo Palmer	9,492	41.52	+1.80
Independent	Janie Finlay	6,915	30.24	+30.24
Labor	Jess Greene	2,076	9.08	+9.08
Independent	David Fry	1,907	8.34	+8.34
Greens	Jack Davenport	1,713	7.49	+7.49
Independent	Vivienne Gale	761	3.33	+3.33
Total formal votes		22,864	98.02	+1.59
Informal votes		462	1.98	−1.59
Turnout		23,326	84.81	+3.49
Registered electors		27,503		
Two-candidate-preferred result
Liberal	Jo Palmer	11,492	50.57	+10.85
Independent	Janie Finlay	11,232	49.43	+49.43
Liberal gain from Independent				
