= 2008 Tasmanian Legislative Council periodic election =

Legislative election in Tasmania, Australia

← 2007	3 May 2008	2009 →

2 of the 15 seats in the Legislative Council 8 seats needed for a majority
	First party
Party	Independent
Seats before	2
Seats won	2
Seat change	Steady

Periodic elections for the Tasmanian Legislative Council were held on 3 May 2008. The two seats up for election were Huon, held by independent MLC Paul Harriss, and Rosevears, held by independent MLC Kerry Finch. These seats were last contested in 2002.

== Huon ==
Independent MLC Paul Harriss had held Huon since 1996. A former Liberal Party member, there was speculation about his endorsement as a federal Liberal candidate for the federal seat of Franklin in the 2007 federal election, but this did not eventuate. His only opponent was Huon Valley councillor Mark Rickards, an endorsed candidate of the Tasmanian Greens, who focused his campaign on Harriss's support for the Gunns pulp mill.

=== Huon Results ===
Tasmanian Legislative Council periodic elections, 2008: Huon
Party	Candidate	Votes	%	±%
Independent	Paul Harriss	12,149	62.04	+12.61
Greens	Mark Rickards	7,435	37.96	+37.96
Total formal votes		19,584	96.32	−1.31
Informal votes		748	4.68	+1.31
Turnout		20,332	82.86	−4.75
Independent hold		Swing		

== Rosevears ==
Independent MLC Kerry Finch first won Rosevears in 2002, when it was a new seat. He was not opposed by the Tasmanian Greens, which was attributed to his opposition to the Gunns pulp mill and his generally socially liberal views. Like Harriss, he attracted only one challenger, in this case independent Colin O'Brien. O'Brien gave qualified support to the pulp mill.

=== Rosevears Results ===
Tasmanian Legislative Council periodic elections, 2008: Rosevears
Party	Candidate	Votes	%	±%
Independent	Kerry Finch	12,990	72.66	+45.43
Independent	Colin O'Brien	4,889	27.34	+27.34
Total formal votes		17,879	95.30	−0.75
Informal votes		881	4.70	+0.75
Turnout		18,760	80.16	−5.97
Independent hold		Swing	+21.87	
