= 2022 Tasmanian Legislative Council periodic election =

Legislative election in Tasmania, Australia

- 7 May 2022

3 of the 15 seats on the Legislative Council 8 seats needed for a majority
	First party	Second party
Party	Independent	Labor
Seats before	1	2
Seats won	2	1
Seat change	▲1	▼1
- Results by electoral division

Periodic elections for the Tasmanian Legislative Council were held on 7 May 2022. Two seats were up for a regularly scheduled vote; Elwick and McIntyre. Simultaneously a by-election was held in the seat of Huon, following the resignation of the incumbent member Bastian Seidel.

== Elwick ==
Josh Willie of the Labor Party was the incumbent candidate and was re-elected.

=== Elwick Results ===
2022 Tasmanian Legislative Council periodic elections: Elwick
Party	Candidate	Votes	%	±%
Labor	Josh Willie	9,450	52.54	+5.90
Independent	Rick Cazaly	4,750	26.41	+26.41
Greens	Hannah Bellamy	3,788	21.06	+8.86
Total formal votes		17,988	96.36	+1.42
Informal votes		680	3.64	−1.42
Turnout		18,668	78.03	−2.36
Registered electors		23,925		
Labor hold		Swing		

== McIntyre ==
Independent Tania Rattray was the incumbent candidate and was re-elected.

=== McIntyre Results ===
2022 Tasmanian Legislative Council periodic elections: McIntyre
Party	Candidate	Votes	%	±%
Independent	Tania Rattray	13,568	57.67	+7.81
Independent	David Downie	6,391	27.17	+27.17
Greens	Mitchell Houghton	3,566	15.16	+6.34
Total formal votes		23,525	96.44	
Informal votes		869	3.56	
Turnout		24,394	83.00	
Registered electors		29,391		
Independent hold		Swing		

== Huon by-election ==
2022 Huon state by-election
- 7 May 2022

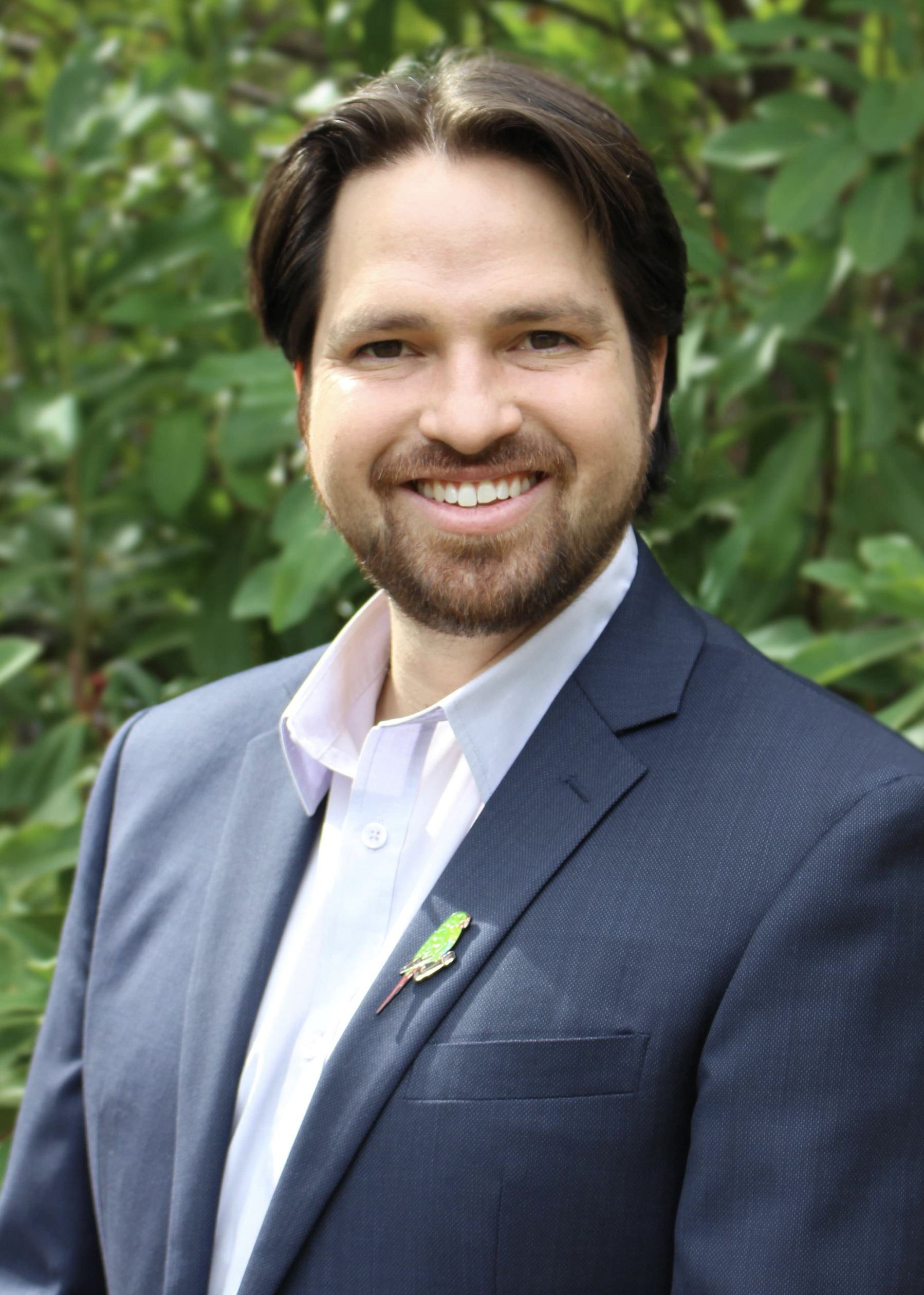
	First party	Second party
		IND
Candidate	Toby Thorpe	Dean Harriss
Party	Labor	Independent
First preference vote	5,648	5,340
Percentage	25.05%	23.68%
Swing	▼6.24	▲7.54
TPP	47.45%	52.55%
TPP swing	▼9.86	▼52.55
	Third party	Fourth party
Candidate	Aldo Antolli	Gideon Cordover
Party	Liberal	Greens
First preference vote	5,111	4,704
Percentage	22.66%	20.86%
Swing	▲22.66	▲3.32
MLC before election
Bastian Seidel
Independent
Elected MLC
Dean Harriss
Independent

A by-election for the seat of Huon was also held with the periodic elections, following the resignation of incumbent MLC Bastian Seidel.

Seidel had been elected as a member of the Labor Party in 2020. However, on 23 August 2021 he announced he had resigned from Labor to sit as an independent, and would resign from parliament in 2022.

=== Candidates ===
Party	Candidate	Background
Labor	Toby Thorpe	2021 Tasmanian Young Australian of the Year
Independent	Dean Harriss	Son of former Huon MLC Paul Harriss
Liberal	Aldo Antolli	CEO of Pathways Tasmania
Greens	Gideon Cordover	Kingborough councillor since 2019
Local	Pat Caplice	Anti-pokies campaigner

=== Huon results ===
2022 Huon state by-election
Party	Candidate	Votes	%	±%
Labor	Toby Thorpe	5,648	25.05	−6.24
Independent	Dean Harriss	5,340	23.68	+7.54
Liberal	Aldo Antolli	5,111	22.66	+22.66
Greens	Gideon Cordover	4,704	20.86	+3.32
Local	Pat Caplice	1,748	7.75	+7.75
Total formal votes		22,551	97.35	−0.09
Informal votes		615	2.65	+0.09
Turnout		23,166	86.20	+0.64
Registered electors		26,876		
Two-candidate-preferred result
Independent	Dean Harriss	11,840	52.55	+52.55
Labor	Toby Thorpe	10,693	47.45	−9.86
Independent gain from Labor		Swing	N/A	
