= Joel Marklund =

Swedish photographer (born 1985)

Joel Marklund (born June 21, 1985) is a Swedish photographer who specialises in sports. Based in New York City, USA and Stockholm, Sweden, he is currently Chief Photographer at the Swedish sports photo agency Bildbyrån.

Marklund was born in Boden, Sweden.

== Career ==
He started his career at the local newspaper NSD before moving on to Aftonbladet in 2007. The same year he joined Bildbyrån as a staff photographer and in 2013 became the chief photographer of the agency.

Marklund has worked in more than 45 different countries and covered numerous global events, including five Olympic Games. He has been part of the official photography team for The All England Lawn Tennis & Croquet Club. Marklund was featured together with comedian Johan Rheborg and swimmer Sarah Sjöström in the TV show "Alla är fotografer" which was broadcast by SVT on March 15, 2015. On January 14, 2016 Marklund was introduced by Nikon as the first Nikon Europe Ambassador.

Between September 22, 2017, and November 5, 2017 some of his images were showcased at the photo exhibition "Living 24/7" in Düsseldorf, Germany together with photographers such as Peter Lindbergh, Steve McCurry, Ami Vitale, Jodi Bieber and Charlie Cole.

== Awards and honors ==
- Picture of the Year International
- NPPA Best of Photojournalism
- Swedish Picture of the Year Award
- 2014: 3rd prize in the category Sports Photojournalist of the Year in the photography contest Best of Photojournalism by the National Press Photographers Association
