= Phua =

Phua is a Malaysian and Singaporean spelling of the Chinese family name Pan (Mandarin), also spelled Poon, Pun or Phoon (Cantonese), and Pua, Puah or Phuah (Hokkien, Teochew or Hainanese) and may refer to:

- Denise Phua (born 1959), Singaporean politician
- Phua Siok Gek Cynthia (born 1958), Singaporean politician
- May Phua (born 1975 or 1976), Singaporean actress
- Willie Phua (1928–2024), Singaporean photojournalist
- Phua Chu Kang, character in the Singaporean sitcom of the same name
