= Electorates of the Australian states and territories =

Electoral district of the Australian states and territories

The lower houses of the parliaments of the states and territories of Australia are divided into electoral districts. Most electoral districts (except the Australian Capital Territory and Tasmania, which have multi-member electorates using a proportional voting method) send a single member to a state or territory's parliament using the preferential method of voting. The area of a state electoral district is dependent upon the Electoral Acts in the various states and vary in area between them. At present, there are 409 state electoral districts in Australia.

State electoral districts do not apply to the upper house, or legislative council, in those states that have one (New South Wales, South Australia, Tasmania, Victoria and Western Australia). In New South Wales and South Australia, MLCs represent the entire state, in Tasmania they represent single-member districts, and in Victoria and Western Australia they represent a region formed by grouping electoral districts together.

== By State/Territory ==
=== Australian Capital Territory ===
There are five electorates for the Legislative Assembly, each with five members each, making up 25 members in total.

=== New South Wales ===
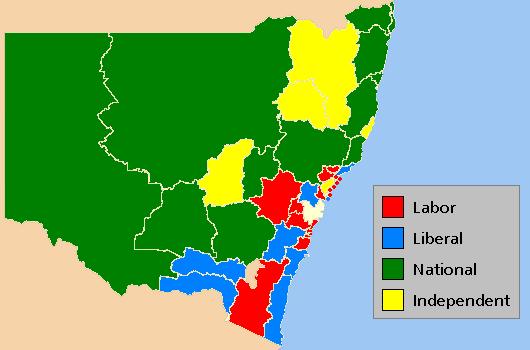
Results of the 2007 New South Wales state election showing the state electoral districts

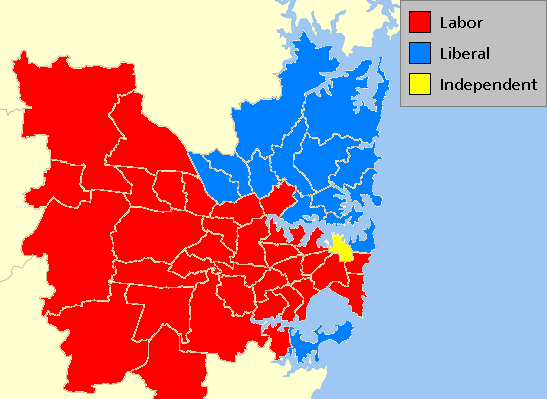
Results of the 2007 New South Wales state election showing the districts in Sydney

There are currently 93 electoral districts in New South Wales.

=== Northern Territory ===
There are 25 single-member electoral divisions in the Northern Territory, and 17 former divisions.

=== Queensland ===
There are 93 electoral districts in Queensland, for the Legislative Assembly of Queensland. Information about the QLD electoral districts for the 2006 elections can be obtained from the Electoral Commission of Queensland website.

=== South Australia ===
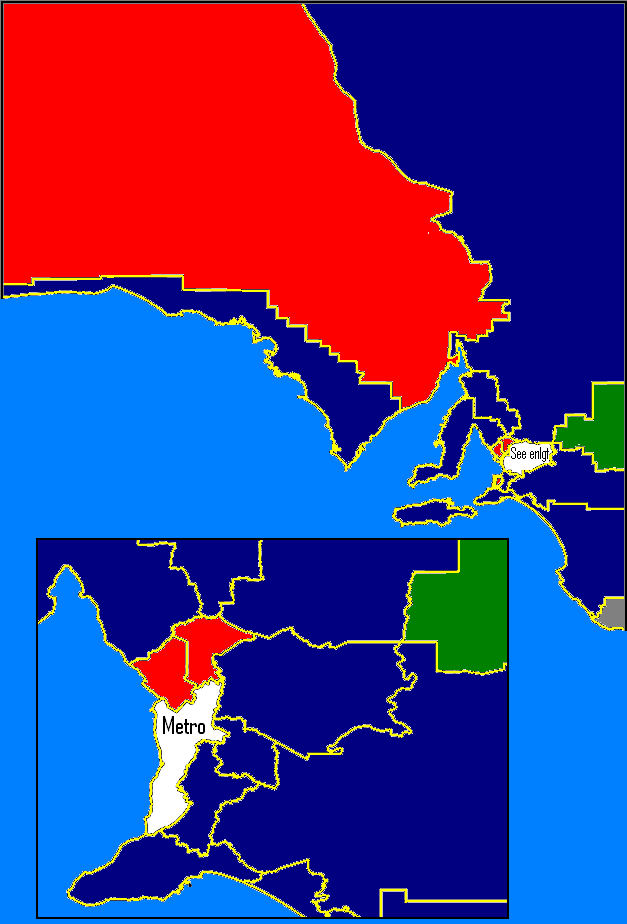
Results of the 2006 South Australian state election showing state electoral districts

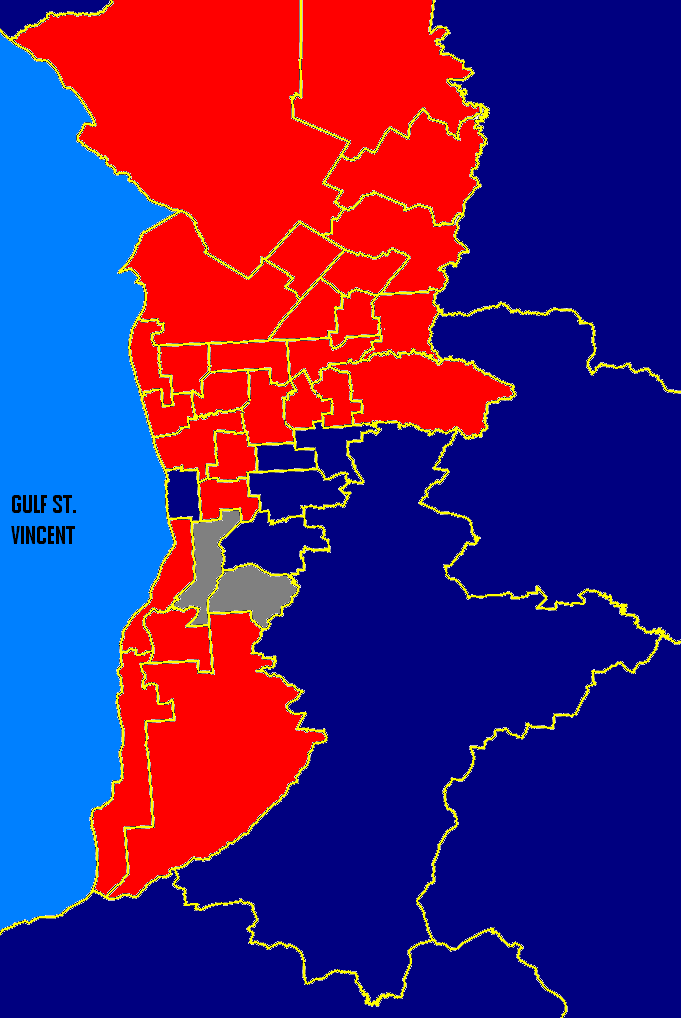
Results of the 2006 South Australian state election showing metro electoral districts around Adelaide

There are 47 single-member electoral districts in South Australia, for the South Australian House of Assembly.

=== Tasmania ===
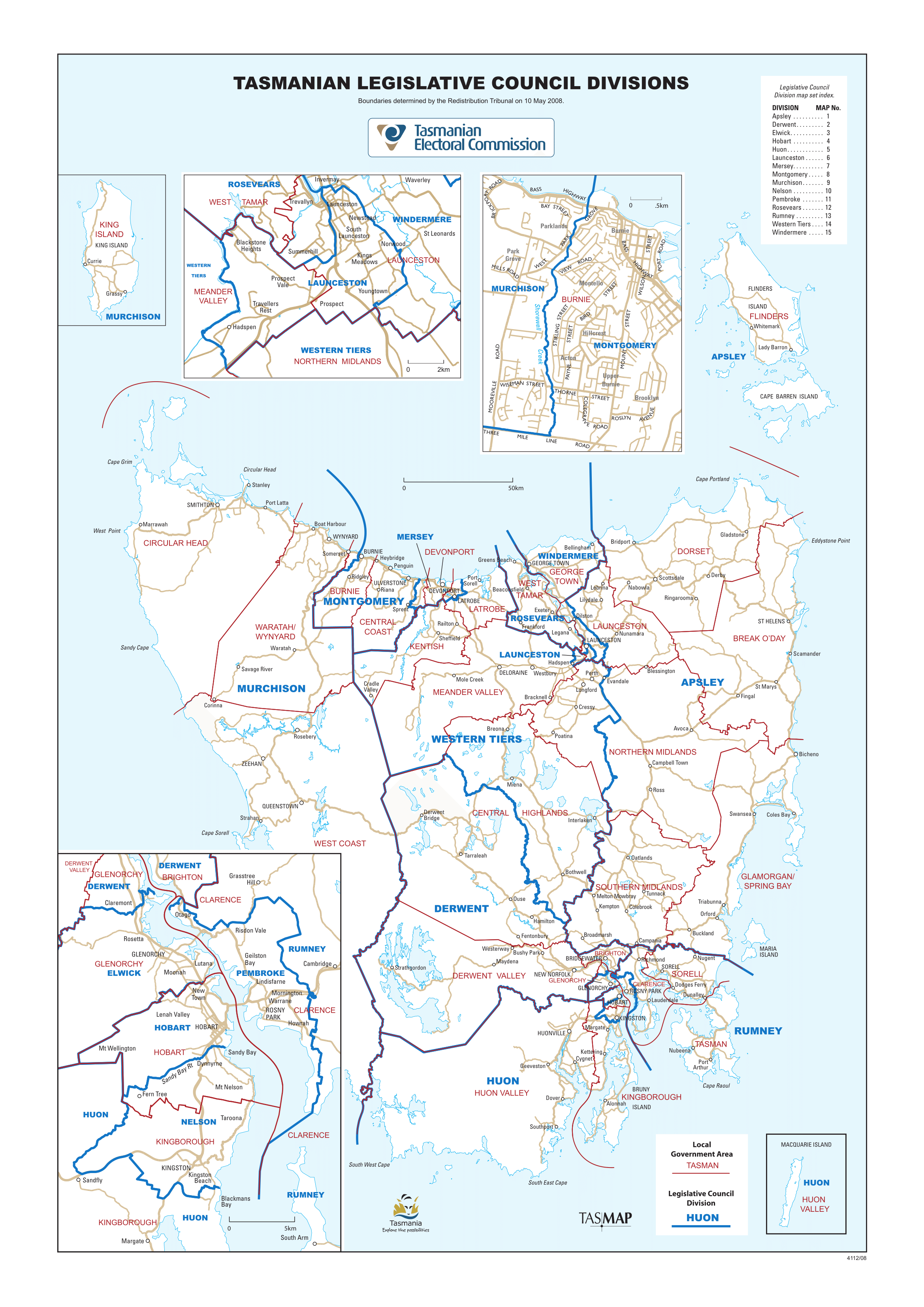
Tasmanian State Electorates

There are 15 electoral divisions in Tasmania for the upper house Legislative Council.

In the lower house the five federal divisions are used, but electing 5 members each

=== Victoria ===
Electoral districts of Victoria

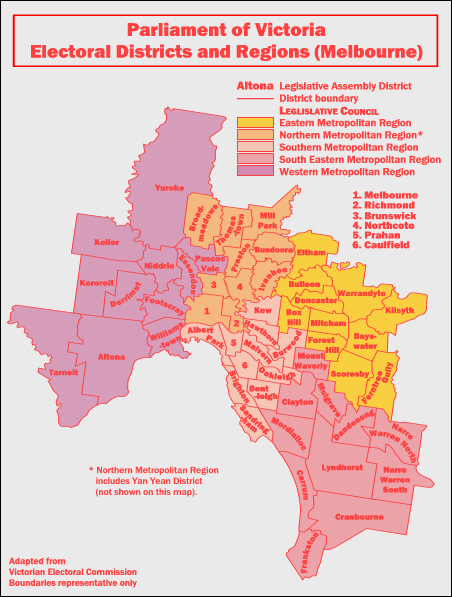
Electoral districts in the Melbourne area

There are 88 electoral districts in Victoria, for the Victorian Legislative Assembly.

=== Western Australia ===
There are 59 single-member electoral districts in Western Australia for the Western Australian Legislative Assembly. 42 are in the Perth metropolitan area and 17 are in the rest of the state.

== See also ==
- Divisions of the Australian House of Representatives (for federal seats)
- Local government in Australia (for local councils)
- Parliaments of the Australian states and territories
