= 2026 Tasmanian Legislative Council periodic election =

Legislative election in Tasmania, Australia

- 2 May 2026

2 of the 15 seats in the Legislative Council 8 seats needed for a majority

	First party	Second party	Third party
	IND
Party	Independents	Liberal	Labor
Seats before	1	1	0
Seats won	1	1	0
Seat change	Steady	Steady	Steady

The 2026 Tasmanian Legislative Council periodic election was held on 2 May 2026 to elect two members of the Tasmanian Legislative Council. The seats of Huon and Rosevears were up for election.

In Huon, incumbent independent MLC Dean Harriss ran for his first six-year term, having initially won the seat at a by-election in 2022, however he was defeated by another independent, Clare Glade-Wright.

In Rosevears, incumbent Liberal MLC Jo Palmer successfully held her seat and won a second consecutive term, defeating Labor candidate Ben McKinnon on both the primary and the two-candidate preferred vote.

== Huon ==
Huon is an electorate in Tasmania's south, covering areas nearby Hobart including Huonville and Margate. Since the 2022 by-election, Huon was held by independent Dean Harriss.

On 8 November 2025, Clare Glade-Wright, the deputy mayor of Kingborough Council, announced she would contest Huon. On 11 January 2026, Labor Party leader Josh Willie announced that pepper berry farmer and Hobart City Council worker Abby McKibben would be Labor's candidate. On 21 February 2026 the Tasmanian Greens announced that Paul Gibson, the partner of Tasmanian Greens leader Rosalie Woodruff and Huon Valley councillor, would be the Greens candidate.

=== Results ===
2026 Tasmanian Legislative Council periodic elections: Huon
Party	Candidate	Votes	%	±%
Independent	Dean Harriss	7,107	30.81	+14.67
Independent	Clare Glade-Wright	6,330	27.45	+27.45
Labor	Abby McKibben	3,843	16.66	−14.63
Greens	Paul Gibson	3,468	15.04	−2.50
Independent	Michael Rowan	1,237	5.36	+5.36
Independent	Tyler Petersen	1,079	4.68	+4.68
Total formal votes		23,064	95.57	−1.86
Informal votes		1,068	4.43	+1.86
Turnout		24,132	84.29	−1.28
Registered electors		28,631		
Two-candidate-preferred result
Independent	Clare Glade-Wright	11,988	52.49	+52.49
Independent	Dean Harriss	10,849	47.51	+47.51
Independent gain from Independent				

Swings calculated against the 2020 election.

== Rosevears ==
Rosevears is an electorate in Tasmania's north, covering the west bank of the Tamar River, including parts of Launceston. Since the 2020 election, Rosevears has been held by Liberal Jo Palmer.

On 19 January 2026, Labor Party leader Josh Willie announced that teacher Ben Mckinnon would be Labor's candidate. On 22 February 2026 the Tasmanian Greens announced that lawyer Charlene McLennan would be the Greens candidate.

=== Results ===
2026 Tasmanian Legislative Council periodic elections: Rosevears
Party	Candidate	Votes	%	±%
Liberal	Jo Palmer	9,820	42.42	+0.90
Labor	Ben McKinnon	5,813	25.11	+16.03
Greens	Charlene McLennan	3,807	16.44	+8.95
Independent	Susan Monson	3,710	16.03	+16.03
Total formal votes		23,150	97.09	−0.93
Informal votes		693	2.91	+0.93
Turnout		23,843	82.87	+1.55
Registered electors		28,771		
Two-party-preferred result
Liberal	Jo Palmer	12,223	52.80	+2.23
Labor	Ben McKinnon	10,927	47.20	+47.20
Liberal hold				

== See also ==
- 2026 Nepean state by-election, held on the same day as the council elections
