= May Isabella Weatherly =

- Born: May Isabella Bird; 22 May 1868; Ballarat, Victoria, Australia
- Died: 2 November 1950 (aged 82); Malvern, Victoria, Australia
- Education: University of Tasmania
- Known for: founding principal of Invergowrie Homecraft Hostel
- Successor: Margaret Kirkhope
- Spouse: James Weatherly
- Children: five step daughters

May Isabella Weatherly born May Isabella Bird (22 May 1868 – 2 November 1950) was an Australian headmistress. She was the founding principal of what became the Invergowrie Homecraft Hostel.

== Life ==
Weatherly was born in 1868 in Ballarat, Victoria. Her mother was Helen (born Chisholm in Scotland) and her clergyman and politician father was Bolton Stafford Bird. She had some of her education in Tasmania and the rest at the Methodist Ladies College in Kew. After her education was complete she was employed by the college as a teacher until 1895. She taught and continued to teach even after she enrolled in the University of Tasmania. She graduated in 1904 and became Senior Mistress at Queen's College in Ballarat.

In 1907 she left her first headship after only a few months in order that she could marry a Scottish-born widower with five daughters. She was nearly forty and he was sixty seven years old. They lived at Stawell in Victoria where her new husband was a grazier.

In 1929 a homecraft hostel was opened in a small villa in the Melbourne suburb of Malvern and Weatherly was the first principal. Initially there was just four girls and two of those were not boarding where it was based. In 1933 W. E. McPherson gave his father's Invergowrie House to be used by the hostel. By this time she had a co-principal who was Margaret Kirkhope. They led the hostel together until 1938 when Weatherly retired.

== Death and legacy ==
Weatherly died at her home in Malvern, Victoria in 1950. The hostel then had 62 students and 42 of those were boarders. The Invergowrie Homecraft Hostel stayed open until 1973 after 2,000 students had passed through its doors. The hostel was sold and the money became the Invergowrie Foundation.
