= Ann Dinham =

English woman exiled to Australia (1827–1882)

- Born: March 17, 1827; Wotton-under-Edge, Gloucestershire, England
- Died: 2 May 1882 (aged 54–55); London, England
- Occupations: Milliner and dressmaker
- Spouses: William Cozens Dinham; Charles Riddiford; John Foster
- Children: 10

Ann Dinham (17 March 1827 – 2 May 1882); born Ann Orchard, and later Ann Riddiford and Ann Foster, was keeping an inn in Abergavenny, Monmouthshire in 1851 with her husband, William, when she was convicted of inciting a burglary and sentenced to be transported to Tasmania for ten years. In Tasmania, she married John Foster, a wealthy businessman, magistrate and member of the Tasmanian Legislative Council. After his death, she took their five surviving children to be educated in England, and was thus one of the few Australian convicts to return to her native land.

== Early life ==
Dinham was born in the Gloucestershire town of Wotton-under-Edge on 17 March 1827. Her father, James Orchard, is described in the 1851 census as a "Dealer in Marine Stores", a term applied to traders in second-hand goods and "rag and bone men". Her mother, Elizabeth, died in 1839, when Dinham was about 12 years old and her father remarried before the end of that year. The 1841 census shows Dinham and two younger siblings living with their father and stepmother in Church Street, Wotton-under-Edge.

It is not known when she left Wotton, or where she met her first husband, William Cozens Dinham, who had been born in Bath, Somerset in 1825, but they married in Newport, Monmouthshire in 1847. Their marriage certificate describes him as a "timekeeper" but he was, in fact, a warder at Usk Prison. In December 1848, William Dinham was appointed as the first superintendent of the Abergavenny Town Police, a very small force which had only three constables in addition to the superintendent. William Dinham only served in the role until March 1850; the reasons for his dismissal seem to have been mainly about a need to save money, though some local ratepayers expressed concerns about his performance.

By April 1851, the family were living at 53 Monk Street, Abergavenny and keeping an inn. The census of that year shows that they had two children: a son, also William, born in 1848 and a daughter, Eliza, born in February 1851. A second son, James had been born in 1849 but he had died of typhus in September 1850.

Surname	First Name	Rel.	Marr.	Age	Sex	Occupation	Birth Place
Dinham	William Cousins	Head	M	26	M	Innkeeper	Lyncombe & Widcombe, Bath
Dinham	Ann	Wife	M	21	F		Wotten under Edge, Gloucestershire
Dinham	William C.	Son	U	2	M		Usk, Monmouthshire
Dinham	Eliza Ann	Daur	U	6 wks	F		Abergavenny, Monmouthshire
Kelson	George	Lodg	U	35	M	Labourer	Turley, Wiltshire
Watts	Eliza	Serv	U	16	F	Servant	Llanishen, Monmouthshire

== Trial and conviction ==
Dinham was tried at Monmouth Assizes on 8 August 1851 and convicted of inciting a burglary. Her trial was reported both in a local newspaper, the Monmouthshire Beacon, and nationally in The Times. The latter commented that "This case was remarkable for the train of circumstantial evidence by which the guilt of the woman was established." She was tried together with Francis Davies, who was one of the two men accused of committing the burglary. The other was Henry Clarke, who had already previously been convicted of the crime and sentenced to transportation, and who gave evidence for the prosecution in this trial.

At the time of the burglary, in January 1851, Dinham and her husband were keeping an inn in Abergavenny. The house that was burgled was in Usk, which is about 11 miles from Abergavenny, but the police suspected that the culprits had come from Abergavenny because some of the stolen items were found along the road between the two towns. Continuing their investigations, the police visited the Dinhams' public house and spotted other items that they suspected had been taken from the house in Usk. Dinham was arrested and the police discovered that she had been to the house in Usk as a dressmaker and had made clothes for the two women who lived there. They also arrested the two men who had carried out the burglary; one of whom said that Dinham had provided them with information about their target. William evaded the police and escaped to the United States where he eventually settled in Iowa and became a farmer.

The jury found Dinham guilty but recommended that the judge should show her mercy because they believed that she had been coerced by her husband. Mr Justice Erle agreed to consider the jury's recommendation and to defer sentence until the following morning in order to make enquiries about the extent of her husband's influence. The next day, he announced that he had made inquiries as to how far she had been influenced by her husband and that he did not know a more remarkable degree of guilt than that of hers. He then sentenced her to ten years exile to Tasmania.

It is not known who or what was consulted by Mr Justice Erle before he reached his conclusion. As was normal at that time, no consideration appears to have been given to the fact that Dinham was the mother of two young children.

Francis Davies, who the judge said had led a long career of the most flagrant crime, was sentenced to 20 years for the burglary.

== Transportation to Australia ==
Dinham was held in custody from the time of her trial in August 1851. On 30 September 1851 Ann was sent from Monmouth to Millbank Prison where she was held until the following March, when she sailed for Tasmania aboard the convict transport Sir Robert Seppings, which left Woolwich on 17 March 1852, carrying 220 female convicts. After a voyage of 112 days, the ship arrived in Hobart, Tasmania on 8 July 1852.

Dinham's daughter, Eliza, accompanied her mother on the voyage but died at sea. In his Day Book, the Royal Navy surgeon, Lennox T Cunningham recorded: "Eliza Denham, aged 13 months, Prisoner's Child; disease or hurt, diarrhoea. Put on sick list, 1 May 1852, at sea. Died 3 May 1852. Had been suffering from disorder of the bowels for several days and had been neglected and was very much reduced".

Dinham's son, William, remained in England and was brought up by her elder sister, Elizabeth, and husband.

== Arrival in Hobart and second marriage ==
On arrival, Dinham was registered in the convict records with the following description:- Ann Dinham, 4' 11", 23, black hair, grey eyes, milliner and dressmaker, Convicted Monmouth Assizes 8 August 1851, 10 years, for inciting a person to commit a burglary, Native place - Gloucestershire, Married - 2 children, Church of England, read and write, Husband William in America, Father - James.

The record also states that she had been "Five years on the town", a euphemism for having been a prostitute. It is difficult to see how this can have possibly been true given what is known now about Dinham's life in England, so is perhaps evidence of the general prejudice against female convicts that Robert Hughes described in The Fatal Shore. This allegation was still part of local gossip in Tasmania many years later.

Within a few days, Dinham was assigned to work for a Mr. Williams at the Macquarie Hotel, in Hobart. The following year, she was given permission to marry (despite the fact that her convict record stated that her husband was still alive), and married Charles Riddiford, a convict who had received a conditional pardon and was also a native of Wotton-under-Edge, on 4 October 1853. Their daughter, Sarah Ann Riddiford, was born the following May, but Riddiford died two years later on 3 July 1856.

== Marriage to John Foster ==
Now a widow, Dinham began a relationship with John Foster, a wealthy businessman who had come to Tasmania in 1823 as a free settler. Foster was 35 years older than Dinham. Together they had six children and married in April 1863. In December 1859 he sponsored the passage of Dinham's sister, Maria, and her husband, William Thornbury, as free settlers in Tasmania. Foster's business interests included extensive land holdings both in Tasmania and on the Australian mainland, the ownership of several ships, and directorships in several Tasmanian companies, in banking, insurance, transport, coal and gas. He was a magistrate and member of the Tasmanian Legislative Council between 1868 and 1874.

The fact that Dinham had been a convict was not advertised publicly nor, it seems, passed on to her children. At the time of her marriage to Foster, she was described as the widow of Charles Riddiford and that her maiden name was Orchard; there was no mention of her first married name, Dinham. Various stories circulated in Hobart but Dinham's descendants did not learn about their convict ancestry until late in the 20th century.

== Return to England and death ==
Foster died in 1875 and his will made provision for Dinham to return to England for the education of their children. Dinham set up home in Brighton. When her daughter Sarah Ann Riddiford married in Brighton in December 1876, she was described not as her father's daughter but as John Foster's step-daughter. The family had a very comfortable existence, with the children attending boarding schools and holidays that included spending a month in Paris.

In the 1881 census Dinham, together with three of her children and two servants, was recorded as living at 3 Chesham Place, Brighton, as follows:-

Surname	First Name	Rel.	Marr.	Age	Sex	Occupation	Birth Place
Foster	Ann	Head	W	49	F	Landowner	Wotton under Edge, Gloucs
Foster	Henry	Son	U	18	M	Scholar	Hobart, Tasmania
Foster	Jane	Daur	U	17	F	Scholar	Hobart, Tasmania
Foster	Frances H	Daur	U	15	F	Scholar	Hobart, Tasmania
Cooper	Charlotte	Serv	U	25	F	Cook	Shalden, Hants
Voakes	Emma	Serv	U	20	F	Housemaid	Eastgate, Sussex

Dinham's two other sons, Askin Morrison Foster and John Dowbiggin Foster, were also scholars living nearby as boarders in the home of a private tutor at 21 Eaton Place, Brighton.

Dinham remained in contact by letter with both her father, James Orchard, and son, William Dinham, sending them money from time to time but it appears doubtful that she ever met them again. She died in London in May 1882 and is buried in Kensal Green Cemetery. In Tasmania, she is remembered on the Foster family memorial in Cornelian Bay Cemetery, Hobart and on the Convict Brick Trail, in Campbell Town.

In Hobart, Dinham's death was reported in The Mercury, and a government clerk duly added a final note to her convict record, where the last entry had recorded the granting of a conditional pardon in February 1856.

== Legacy ==
In the 1980s archivist Margaret Glover was asked to sort some Foster family papers by Patricia Foster, wife of a grandson of John Foster, and the author of Foster's entry in the Australian Dictionary of Biography. She discovered that Dinham was not the first convict woman to have had a relationship with one of the Foster brothers. In 1833, John's younger brother, Henry Foster, had had a daughter with Sarah Grayson, a woman assigned to work at their property. That relationship ended with Sarah being sent away, while the child, Henrietta, was raised by the Foster family.

Glover's paper, Where the two rivers meet, presented at the "Colonial Eye" conference at the University of Tasmania in 1999, tells the stories of the two women and contrasts the stark differences in their experiences. Henry's affair was when he was still very young and at a time when marriage with a convict would not have been welcomed by his mother. At that time, the government disapproved of sexual relationships between free settlers and their assigned convicts, and the family might have even risked the withdrawal of the convict labour that they needed to run their farm. John met Dinham much later, when he was older and well established, and prepared to risk social stigma. Moreover, his marriage could not pose any threat to his business interests or personal prosperity at that stage of his life.
