= Sir Robert Seppings (ship) =

British convict transport ship

History

Great Britain
- Name: Sir Robert Seppings
- Namesake: Sir Robert Seppings
- Owner: J. Allen
- Launched: 1844
- Fate: Wrecked by cyclone, Madras, 1872

General characteristics
- Tons burthen: 628
- Length: Overall: Keel:
- Propulsion: Sail

The merchant ship Sir Robert Seppings was launched at Mawlamyine, formerly Moulmein, Burma in 1844 and traded between India and London. It was first recorded in Lloyd's Register in 1848, when the owner was J. Allen, the Master was Richard Stuart and the Mate was Joseph Clutterbuck.

The Sir Robert Seppings was named after the English naval architect of the same name, who had died in 1840. He had been Surveyor of the Navy between 1813 and 1835, and introduced several significant innovations in ship design.

In 1851, the Seppings undertook a voyage on behalf of the British government to transport convicts to the West Indies and the following year transport convicts from England to Tasmania and from Norfolk Island to Tasmania.

== India trade ==
Between 1844 and 1852, the Sir Robert Seppings transported goods between India and London, and vice versa.

== Convict transport to the West Indies ==
From 27 November 1850 to 20 January 1851, the ship undertook a convict contract to Bermuda, conveying 284 prisoners, 54 soldiers, 1 emigrant, 2 women and four children. A diary was kept by the surgeon Hawey Morris and is preserved in the National Archives. Amongst the convicts was Henry Poole, who, together with his accomplice Edward Nightingale, had been convicted of stealing 12 letters from a Great Western Railway mail train at Exeter Assizes on 17 March 1849. Both men were sentenced to 15 years transportation; Nightingale being sent to Fremantle on the Sea Park in 1854.

== Convict transport to Australasia ==
The Seppings sailed from Woolwich on 18 March 1852, carrying 220 female convicts destined for Tasmania. Accompanying them were at least 21 of their children. The Master was Richard S. Stuart, the First Mate was Thomas J. Clark and the Surgeon was Lennox T. Cunningham. The full list of female convicts transported on this voyage is available on the Convict Records website.

In his general remarks, the surgeon reported that the Seppings was a 'fine vessel' of 620 tons, well adapted to carrying 220 female convicts from England to Hobart Town, Tasmania. The main hatchway had been fitted with iron bars instead of the large upright posts which tended to stop light and free ventilation. These were far superior to the wooden bars and the surgeon strongly recommends they should be fitted on all convict ships. One of the water closets for the prisoners was fitted on the top with an iron grating, the invention of the Honourable Captain Dundas, 'it answered most admirably' and after a similar one was fitted to the other water closet they were never bothered with bad smells. When the women embarked the weather was extremely cold, the winds from the north east. The wind changed to south west after several days and there was bad weather. A very large number of cases are on list in his journal, 337, of which 6 died from various diseases, and 11 were sent to the Colonial Hospital in Hobart. There were no cases of continued fever which the surgeon attributes to the care paid to ventilation, cleanliness and dryness.

The voyage is described in the memoirs of James Montagu Smith, a 15-year-old boy seaman on his second voyage to Australia. He described the captain as a proud man who was good commander and competent seaman but who kept himself distant from the crew; all his dealings with them were through the first mate. According to Smith, both the first and second mates were "bad men, much addicted to drink". The surgeon, who was responsible for the wellbeing of the women, he described as a good doctor but an "infernal old scoundrel" that reminded him of a "lecherous old Turk in the midst of his harem".

During the day, the women were allowed on deck and had their meals there if the weather was good but at night they were locked below deck. Discipline was enforced by promoting some of the convicts to "constables", tasked with overseeing their fellows in return for rewards. Punishments included being locked in the "Black Box", which Smith described as a sort of vertical coffin on deck, with only a few small holes at the top — too small to sit or lie down in, or even to stand comfortably. He says it was in use most days.

One convict, Bridget Lyons, died during the voyage. According to Smith, she had been convicted of a murder in Liverpool with her husband, who had been hanged. Her sentence was transportation for life but she refused to eat and starved herself to death. Five of the convicts' children also died during the voyage. The surgeon named them as:- Mary Crooke (6 months), Eliza Denham (13 months), Mary Ann Calligan (18 months), Thomas Joyce (8 months), and Elizabeth Wilson (1 year). Eliza Denham was the daughter of Ann Dinham, who had been convicted at Monmouth assizes of inciting a burglary.

Smith says that the behaviour of the women became "exceedingly good" when they thought that they were approaching their destination. The Seppings reached Hobart on 8 July 1852, after a voyage of 112 days. The convicts were immediately taken to the Brickfields Hiring Depot, from where they could expect to be quickly hired out to a private employer, according to Smith.

After several days in Hobart, the Seppings set sail, again on a government charter, this time destined for Norfolk Island. The mission was to collect about three hundred male convicts from Norfolk Island and bring them back to Port Arthur. The voyage took about three weeks.

Smith describes how the men were brought on board in chains and secured below decks. On the voyage to Port Arthur, there was an attempt at mutiny by the convicts but it was put down by the detachment of soldiers on board. Several convicts were injured, none fatally, and all were delivered to Port Arthur.

== India trade again ==
Once back in Tasmania, James Montagu Smith deserted from the Sir Robert Seppings. Smith says that all the ship's crew wanted to leave her but that his motive was different to theirs. He wanted to get away from a man that he hated, whereas the others were intent on joining the Victorian gold rush. Smith was so keen to leave the Seppings that he accepted a punishment of one month's jail with hard labour on the treadmill in preference to returning to the ship. After leaving Tasmania, the Seppings sailed for Madras to return to its earlier routine of voyages between India and London.

In 1860, the Seppings was still owned by J Allen of London, and the former mate, Thomas J Clark was now master.

== Fate ==
The Seppings, along with several other ships, was wrecked by a cyclone in Madras on 17 June 1872. An official enquiry found that the ship's Master, Thomas Coates, had been at fault by remaining onshore and not returning to his ship when the storm was increasing. His certificate of competency was suspended for ten months. The Mate in Charge, James Hutcheson, was found in default for not taking active precautions for the ship and 270 passengers on board. His certificate of competency was suspended for three months. All on board the ship, including 270 labourers that were being taken to Mauritius, were saved.
