= Tank Man =

Unknown Tiananmen Square protester

- "Tank Man" temporarily stops the advance of four Type 59 tanks on June 5, 1989, in Beijing. This photograph (one of six similar versions) was taken by Jeff Widener of the Associated Press.
- Disappeared: June 5, 1989; 39°54′23.5″N 116°23′59.8″E
- Other names: Wang Weilin (posited); Unknown Protester; Unknown Rebel
- Known for: Iconic photo of him obstructing tanks during the aftermath of the 1989 Tiananmen Square protests and massacre

Chinese name
- Chinese: 坦克人
Transcriptions
Standard Mandarin
- Hanyu Pinyin: Tǎnkè rén

Unknown Protester
- Chinese: 无名的抗议者
Transcriptions
Standard Mandarin
- Hanyu Pinyin: Wúmíng de kàngyì zhě

Unknown Rebel
- Chinese: 无名的反抗者
Transcriptions
Standard Mandarin
- Hanyu Pinyin: Wúmíng de fǎnkàng zhě

Wang Weilin
- Chinese: 王维林
Transcriptions
Standard Mandarin
- Hanyu Pinyin: Wáng Wéilín

Tank Man (also known as the Unknown Protester or the Unknown Rebel) is an unidentified individual, presumed to be a Chinese man, who stood in front of a column of Type 59 tanks on Chang'an Avenue near Tiananmen Square in Beijing on June 5, 1989. The confrontation occurred one day after the government of China forcibly cleared the square following six weeks of pro-democracy demonstrations, resulting in the deaths of hundreds of people, primarily in areas surrounding the square.

On the morning of June 5th, a long column of tanks proceeded east along Chang'an Avenue after the military's clearing operations. A lone man carrying shopping bags stepped into the path of the lead tank and refused to move. When the tank attempted to steer around him, he repeatedly shifted positions to block its movement. The tanks came to a complete stop rather than run him over. The man then climbed onto the lead tank, where he appeared to speak with members of the PLA inside before returning to the road.

The moment was captured by international photographers and television crews watching from balconies and hotel rooms overlooking the avenue. Broadcast around the world, the scene quickly became one of the most iconic and widely recognized known images. Inside China, the image and the accompanying events are subject to censorship.

Multiple documentaries and exhibitions related to the Tiananmen protests highlight the tank confrontation, and the figure of "Tank Man" has become an enduring symbol of nonviolent resistance. The Sunday Express was the first to circulate the name "Wang Weilin" for the protester, though this identification has never been confirmed. His true identity and fate remain unknown, and various news organizations have reported different speculative names. In 2006, Frontline produced a detailed documentary focusing on the events surrounding the incident.

In April 1998, Time magazine included "The Unknown Rebel" in its list of the 100 most influential people of the 20th century. Life magazine's 2003 book 100 Photos That Changed the World also featured the photographs of the tank confrontation. Despite the image's global status as a symbol of individual courage, the Chinese government continues to restrict the distribution and discussion of the photographs and the broader protests on the Internet.

Little reliable information exists regarding the identity or fate of either the protester or the crew of the lead tank. Timothy Brook writes that the man was charged with a ten year prison sentence. Witnesses have reported that other individuals also attempted to block the tank column at different points during the demonstrations. (Note: Shao Jiang, a student leader during the protests, stated: "I witnessed a lot of the people standing up, blocking the tanks.")

== Obstruction ==
At the northeast edge of Tiananmen Square, along Chang'an Avenue, shortly after noon on June 5, 1989, the day after the Chinese government's violent suppression of the Tiananmen protests, "Tank Man" stood in the middle of the wide avenue, directly in the path of a column of approaching Type 59 tanks. Stuart Franklin, who was on assignment for Time magazine, told The New York Times: "At some point, shots were fired and the tanks carried on down the road toward us, leaving Tiananmen Square behind, until blocked by a lone protester." He wore a white shirt and black trousers, and he held two shopping bags. As the tanks came to a stop, the man gestured at them with one of the bags. In response, the lead tank attempted to drive around the man, but the man repeatedly stepped into the path of the tank in a show of nonviolent action. After repeatedly attempting to go around, the lead tank stopped its engines, and the armored vehicles behind it followed suit. There was a short pause with the man and the tanks having reached a quiet, still impasse.

Having successfully brought the column to a halt, the man climbed on top of the hull of the buttoned-up lead tank and, after briefly stopping at the driver's hatch, appeared in video footage of the incident to call into various ports in the tank's turret. He then climbed atop the turret and seemed to have a short conversation with a crew member at the gunner's hatch. After ending the conversation, the man descended from the tank. The man is then seen briefly speaking with a second person who is riding his bicycle across the street in front of the stationary tanks, as they begin to start their engines again. It is unclear whether he is still seeking to obstruct the tanks.

At this point, the video footage shows two figures in blue running over to pull the man away and lead him to a nearby crowd; the tanks then continued on their way. Eyewitnesses are unsure who pulled him aside. Charlie Cole, who was there for Newsweek, claimed it was Chinese government agents, while Jan Wong, who was there for The Globe and Mail, thought that the men who pulled him away were concerned bystanders.

== Identity and whereabouts ==
Little is publicly known of the man's identity or that of the commander of the lead tank. Shortly after the incident, the London newspaper Sunday Express named him as Wang Weilin, a 19-year-old student who was later charged with "political hooliganism" and "attempting to subvert members of the People's Liberation Army." Several other sources and Timothy Brook's analysis also identify Tank Man as Wang Weilin, son of a factory worker.

This claim has been refuted by internal Chinese Communist Party documents, which reported that they could not find the man, according to the Hong Kong-based Information Center for Human Rights. One party member was quoted as saying: "We can't find him. We got his name from journalists. We have checked through computers but can't find him among the dead or among those in prison." Numerous theories have sprung up as to the man's identity and whereabouts.

Conflicting stories tell what happened to him after the demonstration. In a speech to the President's Club in 1999, Bruce Herschensohn, former deputy special assistant to US President Richard Nixon, said he was executed 14 days later; other sources say he was executed by firing squad a few months after the Tiananmen Square protests. In Red China Blues: My Long March from Mao to Now, Jan Wong writes that she believes from her interactions with the government media that they have "no idea who he was either" and that he is still alive on the mainland. Another theory is that he escaped to Taiwan and got a job as an archaeologist at the National Palace Museum. This was first reported by Yonhap News of South Korea.

The Chinese government has made few statements about the incident or the people involved. The government denounced him as a "scoundrel" once on state television, but the segment was never shown publicly again. In a 1990 interview with Barbara Walters, Jiang Zemin, then General Secretary of the Chinese Communist Party, was asked what became of the man. Jiang first said (through an interpreter), "I can't confirm whether this young man you mentioned was arrested or not", and then replied in English, "I think [that he was] never killed." The government also argued that the incident evidenced the "humanity" of the country's military.

In a 2000 interview with Mike Wallace, Jiang said, "He was never arrested." He then stated, "I don't know where he is now." He also emphasized that the tank stopped and did not run the young man over.

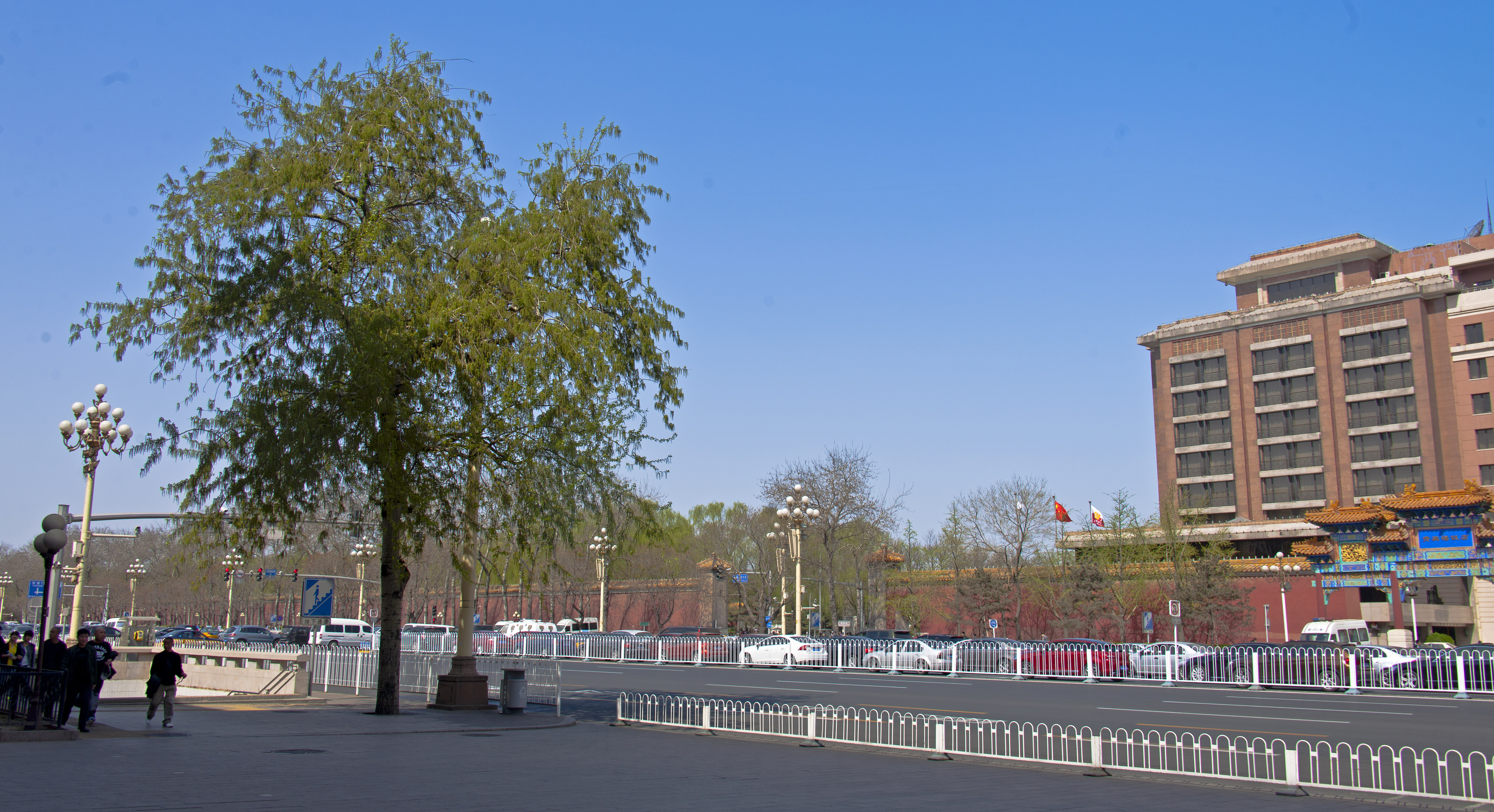
The intersection in 2014, viewed from a different angle

In July 2017, it was reported by Apple Daily that the Tank Man's real name may be Zhang Weimin, a native of Shijingshan, Beijing, who was 24 years old in 1989. The man who gave the story claimed that he was in the same cell with Zhang in Beijing Yanqing Prison. The verdict stated that he struck a tank with a brick and was initially sentenced to life imprisonment, which was later reduced to 20 years. After winning an award at Yanqing Prison, he was released on parole in 2007. After his release, however, he had no relatives or housing and developed a gambling habit. A few years later, he was imprisoned at Kenhua Prison (located in Tianjin and managed by Beijing), and his sentence was increased by two years. According to the article, Zhang was still being held in the 11th division of Kenhua Prison, and at the time of the article's publication he was expected to be released shortly.

== Censorship ==
In 2006, a PBS interview of six experts observed that the memory of the Tiananmen Square protests appears to have faded in China, especially among younger Chinese people, due to government censorship. Images of the protest on the Internet have been censored in China. When undergraduate students at Beijing University, which was at the center of the incident, were shown copies of the photograph 16 years later, they were "genuinely mystified". One of the students said that the image was "artwork".

It has been suggested that the "Unknown Rebel", if still alive, may be unaware of his international recognition.

After the events in the square, the local public security bureau treated members of the international press roughly, confiscating and destroying all the film they could find, and forced journalists to sign confessions to offenses such as photography during martial law, punishable by long imprisonment.

On August 20, 2020, a trailer for Call of Duty: Black Ops Cold War showed footage of Tank Man. On video platforms in China like Bilibili, the segment of the trailer was replaced with a black screen. The next day, Activision Blizzard released a shorter version of the trailer worldwide that did not include the scene.

On June 4, 2021, the 32nd anniversary of the 1989 Tiananmen Square massacre, searches for the Tank Man image and videos were censored by Microsoft's Bing search engine worldwide. Hours after Microsoft acknowledged the issue, the search returned only pictures of tanks elsewhere in the world. Search engines that license results from Microsoft such as DuckDuckGo and Yahoo faced similar issues. Microsoft said the issue was "due to an accidental human error." The director of Human Rights Watch, Kenneth Roth, said the idea that it was an inadvertent error is "hard to believe". David Greene, Civil Liberties Director at the Electronic Frontier Foundation, said that content moderation was impossible to do perfectly and "egregious mistakes are made all the time", but, he further elaborated, "At worst, this was purposeful suppression at the request of a powerful state."

== Photographic versions ==
Five photographers managed to capture the event on film. On June 4, 2009, the fifth photographer released an image of the scene taken from ground level.

The widest coverage of the event and one of the best-known photographs of the event, appearing in both of the magazines Time and Life, was documented by Stuart Franklin. He was on the same balcony as Charlie Cole, and his film was smuggled out of the country by a French student, concealed in a box of tea.

The most-used photograph of the event was taken by Jeff Widener of the Associated Press, from a sixth-floor balcony of the Beijing Hotel, about one-half mile (800 m) away from the scene. The image was taken using a Nikon FE2 camera through a Nikkor 400mm 5.6 ED-IF lens and TC-301 teleconverter. The American exchange student Kirk Martsen unexpectedly met Widener in the hotel lobby, and upon request he allowed Widener to take photos from his hotel room. Circumstances were against the photographer, who recalled that the picture was almost not taken. Widener was injured, suffering from the flu and running out of film. Martsen, the college student, hastily obtained a roll of Fuji 100 ASA color negative film, allowing Widener to make the shot. Martsen then smuggled the film out of the hotel, and delivered it to the Beijing Associated Press office. Though he was concerned that his shots were not good, his image was syndicated to many newspapers around the world and was said to have appeared on the front page of all European newspapers. He was also nominated for the Pulitzer Prize but did not win. Nevertheless, his photograph has widely been known as one of the most iconic photographs of all time.

Wider shot by Stuart Franklin showing a column of tanks approaching Tank Man, who is shown near the lower-left corner.

Charlie Cole, working for Newsweek and on the same balcony as Stuart Franklin, hid his roll of film containing Tank Man in a Beijing Hotel toilet, sacrificing an unused roll of film and a roll containing undeveloped images of wounded protesters when the PSB raided his room, destroyed the two rolls of film and forced him to sign a confession to photography during martial law, an imprisonable offence. Cole was able to retrieve the hidden roll and have it sent to Newsweek. He was awarded the 1990 World Press Photo of the Year and the picture was featured in Life's "100 Photographs That Changed the World" in 2003.

On June 4, 2009, in connection with the 20th anniversary of the protests, the Associated Press reporter Terril Jones revealed a photo he had taken showing Tank Man from ground level, a different angle from all of the other known photos of Tank Man. Jones wrote that he was not aware of what he had captured until a month later when printing his photos.

Arthur Tsang Hin Wah of Reuters took several shots from room 1111 of the Beijing Hotel, but only the shot of Tank Man climbing the tank was chosen. It was not until several hours later that the photo of the man standing in front of the tank was finally chosen. When the staff noticed Widener's work, they re-checked Tsang's negative to see if it was of the same moment as Widener's. On March 20, 2013, in an interview by the Hong Kong Press Photographers Association (HKPPA), Tsang told the story and added further detail. He told HKPPA that on the night of June 3, 1989, he was beaten by students while taking photos and was bleeding. A foreign photographer accompanying him suddenly said, "I am not gonna die for your country", and left. Tsang returned to the hotel. When he decided to go out again, the public security stopped him, so he stayed in his room, stood next to the window and eventually witnessed the Tank Man event and took several shots of it.

In addition to the still photography, video footage of the scene was recorded and transmitted across the globe. Australian Broadcasting Corporation (ABC) cameraman Willie Phua, CNN cameraman Jonathan Schaer and National Broadcasting Company (NBC) cameraman Tony Wasserman appear to be the only television cameramen who captured the scene. The ABC correspondents Max Uechtritz and Peter Cave were the journalists reporting from the balcony.

== Staged event theory ==
Harunobu Kato, a Japanese NHK journalist who covered the Tiananmen Square protests on-site, argues that the incident involving the Tank Man was staged by the Chinese Communist Party.

According to Kato, the Tank Man wore a conspicuously bright white shirt, unusual for a student protester who had supposedly been sleeping in the square for days, and nearby military personnel were also seen wearing white shirts. Despite the square allegedly being fully secured by the military a day earlier, the man walked onto the avenue and blocked a column of tanks for more than three minutes. Nearly twenty tanks lined up behind the lead tank did not attempt to bypass him, and the soldiers made no effort to remove or restrain him, instead allowing him to stand there unimpeded.

In addition, despite the heavy security surrounding the square, the Chinese Communist Party later announced that the Tank Man had "escaped," an explanation Kato describes as suspicious.

Kato also notes that many foreign journalists, including himself, were staying at the Beijing Hotel, whose windows provided a perfect vantage point from which the famous scene could be recorded. Furthermore, when General Secretary Jiang Zemin was interviewed by CNN in 2000, he stated that the tanks were "humane because they did not kill the young man and stopped."

At the time, Western media had reported that tanks had run over and killed many students at Tiananmen Square, thus creating a need for the Chinese authorities to counter this perception.

== Legacy ==
In April 1998, Time included the "Unknown Rebel" in a feature titled "Time 100: The Most Important People of the Century". In November 2016, Time included the photograph by Jeff Widener in "Time 100: The Most Influential Images of All Time". Although the images of Tank Man are regarded as iconic symbols of the 20th century, most young people in China do not recognize the photograph because the Chinese government prohibits the circulation of related images on the Internet.

== In media ==
John Woo included a fictionalized version of Tank Man standing in front a tank at an anti-Vietnam war protest in Saigon in his 1990 Hong Kong film Bullet in the Head as part of his allusion to the Tiananmen Square protest.

American heavy metal band Nevermore released a song titled "The Tiananmen Man" on their 1996 album The Politics of Ecstasy. The song's lyrics detail the actions and political motivations of Tank Man.

In the 1999 Crosby, Stills, Nash & Young song "Stand and Be Counted", from the album Looking Forward, David Crosby sings of his gratitude to Tank Man, whose photograph he had framed and mounted.

A similar scene is depicted in the music video for "Only One" (2003) by the American rock band Yellowcard as well as "Club Foot" (2004) by the English rock band Kasabian.

A fictionalized story of Tank Man and a soldier in the tank is told in Lucy Kirkwood's 2013 play Chimerica, which premiered at the Almeida Theatre from May 20, 2013, to July 6, 2013. The final scene of Lauren Yee's 2018 play, The Great Leap, includes another fictionalized story of Tank Man as the protagonist Wen Chang describes himself as the Tank Man while stepping into an enlarged projection of the iconic photograph.

On June 4, 2013, Sina Weibo, China's most popular microblog, blocked terms whose English translations are "today", "tonight", "June 4", and "big yellow duck". If these were searched for, a message appeared stating that the search results could not be shown in accordance with relevant laws, statutes, and policies. The censorship occurred because a photoshopped version of Tank Man, in which rubber ducks replaced the tanks, had been circulating on Twitter—a reference to Florentijn Hofman's Rubber Duck sculpture, which at that time was floating in Hong Kong's Victoria Harbour.

In April 2019, Leica Camera released an advertisement depicting photographers in intense political climates, including 1989 China. The five-minute short ends with a photographer shooting from a hotel window with the Tank Man image reflected in his lens, despite the fact that the original photograph was taken with a Nikon camera. After the Leica brand was censored on Sina Weibo, Leica revoked the advertisement and sought to distance themselves from it.

== See also ==
- 30th anniversary of the 1989 Tiananmen Square protests and massacre
- August Landmesser
- Chinese democracy movement
- Faris Odeh
- Affan Kurniawan
- History of the People's Republic of China
- Human rights in China
- List of photographs considered the most important
- Red Fićo
- Tankie
- He Zhihua
- Tehran's Tank Man
