= Jeff Widener =

American photographer (born 1956)

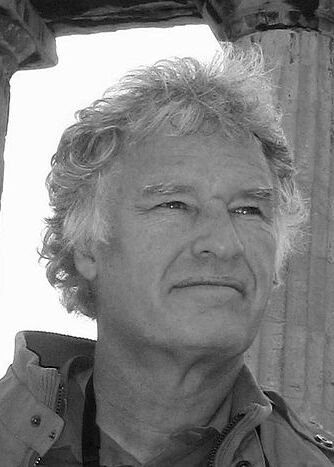
- Widener in 2010
- Born: August 11, 1956 (age 70); Long Beach, California, U.S.
- Education: Los Angeles Pierce College; Moorpark College
- Occupation: Photojournalist
- Known for: Tank Man photograph
- Spouse: Corinna Widener (m. 2010)

Jeff Widener (born August 11, 1956) is an American photojournalist. He has covered assignments in over 100 countries involving civil unrest, wars, and social issues. Widener is best known for his image of the Tank Man confronting a column of tanks in Tiananmen Square in the aftermath of the Tiananmen Square protests of 1989, which made him a nominated finalist for the 1990 Pulitzer.

== Early life ==
Widener was born August 11, 1956, in Long Beach, California. He grew up in Scottsdale, Arizona, and Southern California, outside of Los Angeles. When he was six years old, he became interested in photography after meeting his father's friend who worked for Life.

He attended Cleveland High School in Northridge, California where he took his first photography class before transferring to Reseda High School for his senior year to study photography under Warren King. Reseda High School had a government funded dark room, and King's program had resulted in more photography scholarships than any other high school in the United States.

In 1974 when he was seventeen, Widener received the Kodak Scholastic National Photography Scholarship; the prize included a study tour of England, France, Italy, Kenya and Tanzania. He attended Moorpark College and Los Angeles Pierce College where he was a photographer for the campus newspaper and majored in photojournalism.

== Career ==
Widener began his career in photojournalism and press photographer as a staff photographer for the Whittier Daily News in Whittier, California in 1977. In 1979, he moved to the Las Vegas Sun, followed by the Evansville Press in 1980. In 1981, he accepted a position in Brussels, Belgium as a staff photographer with United Press International. His first foreign assignment was the Solidarity riots in Poland.

He returned to the United States in 1984, working as a staff photographer for The Miami News. From 1987 to 1995, he was an Associated Press picture editor for Southeast Asia, where he covered major stories in the region from the Gulf War to the Olympics from Bangkok, Thailand. Other assignments included East Timor, Afghanistan, Cambodia, Burma, Syria, Jordan, India, Laos, Vietnam, Pakistan, and many more.

In 1995, he returned to Miami, working as a staff photographer for United Press International. He left that position in 1997, working as a staff photographer for The Honolulu Advertiser from 1997 to 2010. After working as a freelance photographer based in Hamburg, Germany, Widener moved to Mexico City, Mexico where he works for Zuma Press.

Through the years, he has covered assignments in over 100 countries involving civil unrest, wars, and social issues, as well as the South Pole.

== 1989 Tiananmen Square protests ==
Widener was present in Beijing at the height of the 1989 Tiananmen Square protests. He was injured during the night event of June 3, 1989, after a stray rock hit him in the head during a mob scene on the Chang'an Avenue. His Nikon F3 titanium camera absorbed the blow, saving his life. Widener described his experience in a 2012 interview:

The split second I raised the camera to my eye, a terrific blow snapped my neck back leaving blood all over my destroyed camera. A stray rock had hit me squarely in the face and the Nikon F3 Titanium camera had absorbed the blow sparing my life. A second later a Chinese soldier jumped out of the back of the blazing APC to surrender but the crowd moved in on him with knives, hatchets, steel pipes and rocks. There was nothing I could do but pick up a stray bicycle and peddle back to the AP office. The massive concussion I received made the world spin like in a slow motion movie. Red tracers from large caliber machine gun fire arched over the Great Hall of The People. Buses were burning; the crackle of gunfire was heard throughout the city. People were screaming and even laughing. It was just insane and I was scared to death. When I managed to return to the AP office at the Diplomatic Compound, Photo editor Mark Avery said ‘Don’t go back out they are killing people’.

Widener was assigned to cover the Tiananmen crackdown for the Associated Press on June 5, 1989. He had brought camera equipment and film to the hotel where he later took the photo, but was at the risk of being denied entry by security personnel. He was helped inside by Kirk Martsen. Widener eventually ran out of film, so he asked Martsen to try and find some. Martsen found John Flitcroft, an Australian backpacker in the hotel lobby, and asked him if he had any spare rolls of film, explaining that Widener had run out of film. Flitcroft said he would give him the roll of film, if he could come up to the hotel room, which overlooked Tiananmen Square. It was this roll of film which Widener used to take the Tank Man photo. Martsen later borrowed Flitcroft's rented bicycle to deliver the film to the Associated Press office at the diplomatic compound.

The "Tank Picture" circulated around the globe (except in China, where it is banned), and is now widely held to be one of the most recognized photos ever taken. Because of that photo, he was nominated finalist for Pulitzer Prize in 1990. In November 2016, Time included the photograph in "Time 100: The Most Influential Images of All Time".

== Awards ==
- 1980 – Photographer of the Year, Nevada State Press Photographer's Association
- 1981 – First Place in Newspaper Chain, Scripps Howard
- 1983 – Spot News - Award of Excellence, World Press Holland
- 1989 – Photographer of the Year, Associated Press Managing Editors
- 1989 – 1st Place Spot News for "Killing Fields", National Headliner Awards
- 1990 – Winner Spot News for "Tank Man", Scoop Award France
- 1990 – Robert Capa Citation for "Tank Man", Overseas Press Club
- 1990 – Finalist in spot news photography for "Tank Man", 1990 Pulitzer Prize
- 1990 – Photographer of the Year 1990, Associated Press Managing Editors
- 1990 – Picture of the Year for "Tank Man" Chia Sardinia Award Italy
- 1990 – Deadline Award for "Tank Man", New York Press Club
- 1997 – First Place Gannett Newspaper Chain, Gannett
- 2004 – 2nd Place Pictorial for "Star Fish", National Press Photographers Association Best of Photojournalism
- 2004 – Award of Excellence for "Star Fish", Pictures of the Year International
- 2008 – Finalist for "Homeless of the Waianae Coasth", Annual Casey Medals for Meritorious Journalism
- 2008 – Finalist for "Homeless on the Waianae Coast", Harry Chapin Media Awards
- 2009 – DART Award for Domestic Violence, from Columbia University Graduate School of Journalism
