= Flying the Flag of the Republic =

Flying the Flag of the Republic - A Record of the Suppression of the Counter-Revolutionary Riots in Beijing
- 飘扬，共和国的旗帜——平息北京反革命暴乱纪实
- Produced by: Propaganda Department of the Political Work Department of the People's Liberation Army
- Distributed by: National Art Museum of China
- Release date: July 28, 1989
- Running time: 105 minutes
- Country: China
- Language: Standard Mandarin Chinese

Flying the Flag of the Republic - A Record of the Suppression of the Counter-Revolutionary Riots in Beijing is a documentary compiled by the Publicity Department of the General Political Department of the People's Liberation Army (PLA) in July 1989 to commemorate the PLA soldiers who died in the 1989 Tiananmen Square protests and massacre. The video was released on 17 July 1989, and premiered at the National Art Museum of China on 28 July 1989. The documentary was also broadcast on China Central Television.

The documentary tells the story of the 1989 Tiananmen Square protests from the perspective of the Chinese Communist Party. Due to its references to many of the sensitive events of the 1989 Tiananmen Square protests and massacre, the documentary is effectively banned within China today.

== Content ==
The 105-minute film Flying the Flag of the Republic tells the story of the 1989 Tiananmen Square protests from the perspective of the Chinese Communist Party (CCP). It is divided into four parts: "The Storm Rises", "The Tide of Turmoil", "The Truth of the Riots", and "The Merit That Will Go Down in History". The documentary is narrated by two voices: a man and a woman.

The documentary opens with a white text on a blue background regarding the events, read by the male narrator; the text blames the events on an "extremely few people", adding "some people are perplexed and confused to this day". It afterwards shows the Flag Raising Ceremony in Tiananmen Square on 9 June 1989. The documentary mentions the founding of the People's Republic of China, then turning to how it says Western countries have used a variety of military and economic means to overthrow the CCP. Failing, the documentary says they turned their focuses on the strategy of "peaceful evolution". It talks about the influence of "bourgeois liberalization" since the start of the reform and opening up, and mentions that hostile forces, such as the United States-funded Voice of America have worked tirelessly to overthrow the People's Republic of China. It mentions the avenues of ideological infiltration, and singles out liberal intellectual Fang Lizhi and the documentary River Elegy; the documentary accuses the latter of "promoting the West’s blue civilization".

The documentary casts the Tiananmen protests as not being peaceful, stating it quickly turned from being "turbulent" to being a "turmoil", eventually leading to a "counterrevolutionary riot". It states that due to this, an intervention from the military was necessary. The documentary shows graphic scenes of violence against soldiers. It additionally includes the clip of the Tank Man, calling him a "lone scoundrel". It casts the military as having exercised the utmost restraint, and states it ousted the illegal occupation in the Tiananmen Square and returned it to the people, restoring order within the capital and the country.

== Distribution and screening ==
Flying the Flag of the Republic was published by Beijing Higher Education Audiovisual Publishing House on 17 July 1989. The premiere was held at the National Art Museum of China on 28 July 1989, and CCP Politburo Standing Committee member Li Ruihuan cut the ribbon for the premiere. From 31 July 1989, it was screened at the exhibition "Suppression of the Counter-Revolutionary Riots in Beijing" jointly organized by the Propaganda Department of the General Political Department of the People's Liberation Army, the Publicity Department of the Beijing Municipal Party Committee and the Military Museum of the Chinese People's Revolution. The documentary was also broadcast on China Central Television. After the video was released, Shanghai prisons and labor camps played the video to prisoners, and schools such as Shanxi University of Finance and Economics, Zhenjiang Shipbuilding College, and Chaozhou Jinshan Middle School organized groups of students to watch the video.

Due to its references to many of the sensitive events of the 1989 Tiananmen Square protests and massacre, the documentary was eventually censored within China. Today, the documentary is effectively banned within China and not available in any Chinese video-sharing websites.

== Reactions ==
Zhou Keyu, deputy director of the General Political Department, said that this was "precious historical evidence that many comrades risked their lives to capture at the scene" and "will help the people further understand the truth". The People’s Daily said that it “used detailed on-site video footage to recreate the entire process of how a small number of people created unrest and the counter-revolutionary riots in the capital occurred, developed, and were quelled”.
