= Athol Meyer =

Australian journalist and politician

Athol Yardley Meyer (28 November 1940 – 31 July 1998) was an Australian journalist and, later, politician.

He was born in Dunedin, New Zealand, but moved to Sydney to work at the ABC. He was later posted to Hobart, Tasmania.

Following work and private travel in the UK and mainland Europe in the mid 1960s, Meyer was posted as an ABC foreign correspondent to Port Moresby (1968-1970) and Kuala Lumpur (1970–72). During his posting in KL, Meyer undertook several assignments in Vietnam, working closely with ABC cameraman Willie Phua (https://www.nma.gov.au/exhibitions/capturing-asia). Meyer and Phua covered preparations for a new Tet offensive (the 'Easter' offensive) and came under fire in the central highlands.

Meyer also covered the Indo-Pakistani war of 1971 (Indo-Pakistani war of 1971).

In 1986 he was elected to the Tasmanian Legislative Council as the independent member for Huon. He served as Chair of Committees from 1993 to 1996. He resigned from the Legislative Council in 1996 having been diagnosed with cancer, to which he succumbed in 1998 at Little Swanport.

Tasmanian Legislative Council
| Previous: Peter Hodgman | Member for Huon; 1986–1996 | Succeeded by Paul Harriss |
