= Ray Bailey =

Australian politician (1935–2012)

Raymond Frederick Bailey (25 November 1935 – 15 February 2012) was a member of the Tasmanian Legislative Council. He was first elected to the now abolished Division of Cornwall on 26 May 1990. He was re-elected in the 1996 Cornwall election.

Bailey became President of the Legislative Council on 17 June 1997, a position which he held until 4 May 2002.

In 1999 a redistribution tribunal abolished his electorate of Cornwall, because of the reduction in the size of parliament. Instead he automatically became member for Rosevears; this new electorate included much of Cornwall anyway. He retired in 2002, and died in 2012.

Tasmanian Legislative Council
Preceded by Reg Hope	President of the Tasmanian Legislative Council; 1997–2002	Succeeded by Don Wing
Preceded by Robin McKendrick	Member for Cornwall; 1990–1999	Abolished
New seat	Member for Rosevears; 1999–2002	Succeeded by Kerry Finch
