= Bastian Seidel =

Australian politician and medical doctor (born 1975)

Member of the Tasmanian Legislative Council for Huon
- In office 1 August 2020 – 7 January 2022
- Preceded by: Robert Armstrong
- Succeeded by: Dean Harriss

Personal details
- Born: 23 April 1975 (age 51) Kamen, Germany
- Citizenship: Australian
- Party: Independent (2021–present)
- Other political affiliations: Labor (2020–2021)
- Education: Leipzig University; University of Pretoria; University of the Free State
- Profession: Medical doctor
- Website: drbastianseidel.net

Bastian Manfred Seidel (born 23 April 1975) is an Australian politician and medical doctor.

Seidel was born in Kamen, a small town in the Ruhr Valley region of Germany, and undertook preliminary medical training in South Africa and Germany, before completing specialist general practitioner training in the United Kingdom. In 2007, he emigrated to Australia on a skilled migrant visa, and established a medical practice in Huonville, Tasmania in 2008. He was president of the Royal Australian College of General Practitioners (RACGP) from 2016 to 2018.

In 2020, Seidel nominated as a candidate for the Australian Labor Party at the 2020 election for the Tasmanian Legislative Council division of Huon. He was elected on 1 August 2020, defeating incumbent independent MLC Robert Armstrong.

In 2018 Seidel (the then Royal Australian College of General Practitioners President) expressed concerns about changes to the register of practitioners. These changes concerned the registering of disciplinary decisions made against practitioners under investigation for sexual misconduct. The Australian Health Practitioner Regulation Agency (AHPRA) and Medical Board believed these changes would give the community easier access to public information to enable them to make an informed decision regarding their medical care.

In February 2021 The Australian newspaper published a report regarding an allegation of sexual assault raised against Seidel with AHPRA. It was alleged the current Shadow Health Minister placed his hand on the vagina of a cancer patient he was treating after taking blood from her. While Seidel denied the allegation the Medical Board's decision (after a 16-month investigation) as outlined in the article stated "while it is possible the incident occurred as described" it was "not able to form a reasonable belief that Dr Seidel had engaged in behaviour that constitutes professional misconduct." The article also raised questions as to whether Seidel informed the Australian Labor Party of this allegation and investigation prior to his party endorsement and Upper House election. Seidel and the Australian Labor Party refused to make any comment in regard to the allegations.

On 23 August 2021, Seidel resigned from the state Labor caucus, stating that he could no longer "work in a toxic environment". His resignation from the Legislative Council took effect on 3 December 2021, and triggered a by-election in the electoral division of Huon.

== Personal life ==
Seidel was married to Erica Bell, an academic, medical researcher and novelist. Bell died from a brain haemorrhage in July 2014, and Seidel established the Erica Bell Foundation in her memory, which awards two $10,000 literary prizes each year.

Seidel became a parent in June 2016 with colleague Dr Alexandra Smith now Dr Alexandra Seidel.

Tasmanian Legislative Council
Preceded by Robert Armstrong	Member for Huon; 2020–2022	Succeeded by Dean Harriss
