= Charlie Cole (photographer) =

American photojournalist (1955–2019)

Charlie Cole (February 28, 1955 – September 5, 2019) was an American photojournalist, one of the five photographers who captured the iconic image of the Tank Man during the 1989 Tiananmen Square protests and massacre.

Cole was born in 1955 in Bonham, Texas, United States. He moved to Japan in 1980, where he worked for magazines and newspapers including Newsweek, Time and The New York Times. He won the 1989 World Press Photo of the Year for a photo of the Tank Man during the 1989 Tiananmen Square protests and massacre, which was taken from a hotel balcony. Cole hid the film roll containing the Tank Man picture in a toilet tank while his hotel room was searched by the Public Security Bureau, later retrieving it to be sent to the Associated Press.

Cole lived in Bali, Indonesia, for more than 15 years. He died at his home there from sepsis on September 5, 2019.
