= Ron Brown (Australian politician) =

Australian politician (1915–1992)

Ronald Herbert Brown (29 January 1915 – 5 April 1992) was an Australian politician.

He was born in Glen Huon, Tasmania. In 1948 he was elected to the Tasmanian Legislative Council as the independent member for Huon. He was Chair of Committees from 1957 until his defeat in 1966.

Tasmanian Legislative Council
Preceded by Rowland Worsley	Member for Huon; 1948–1966	Succeeded by Michael Hodgman
