= John Foster (Tasmanian politician) =

Australian politician

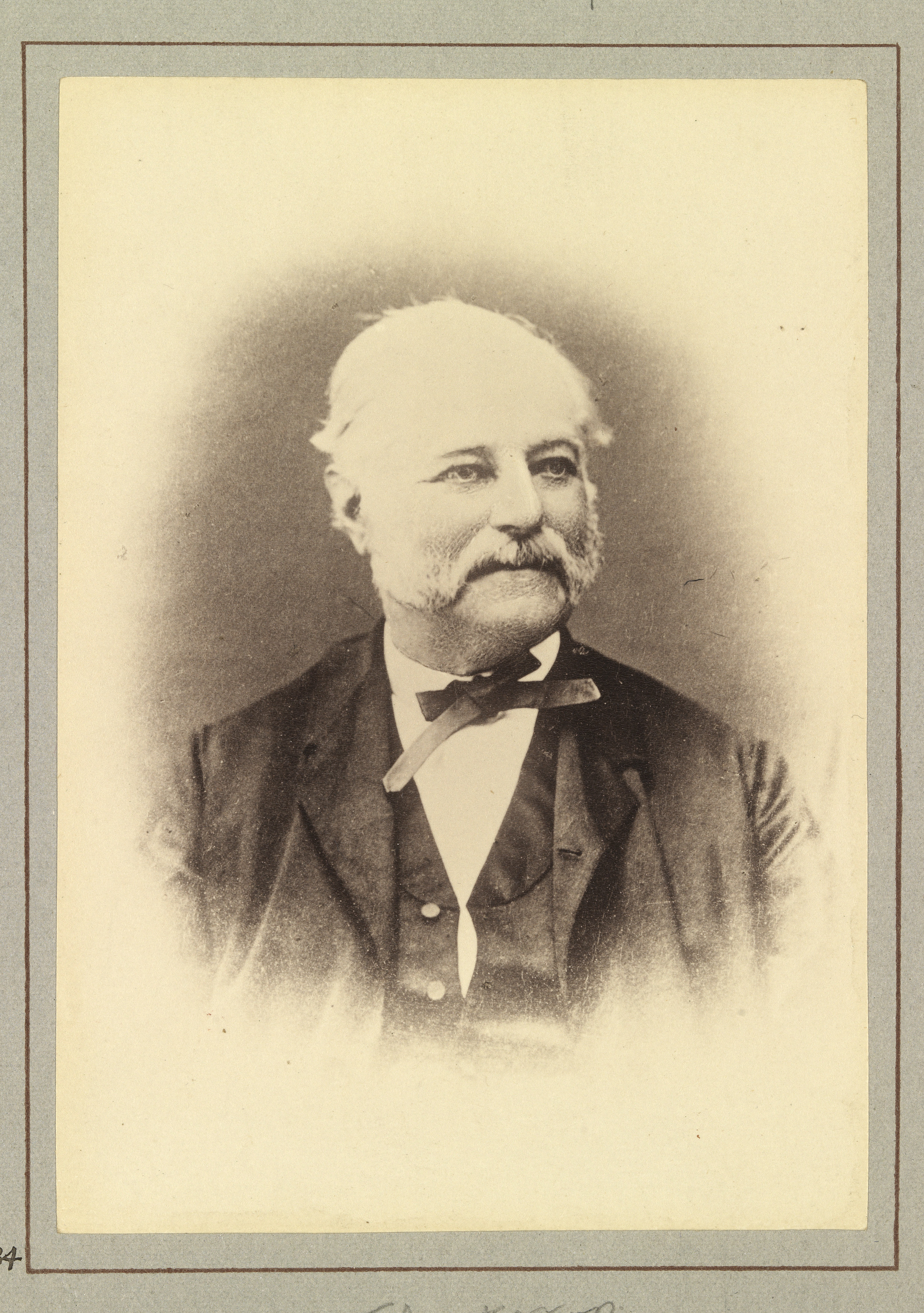
- Born: March 1, 1792; Settle, Yorkshire, England
- Died: June 27, 1875 (aged 83); Hobart, Tasmania
- Occupations: Landowner; Pastoralist; Businessman; Merchant; Shipowner
- Office: Member of the Tasmanian Legislative Assembly
- Term: in office 1868–1864
- Spouse: Ann Riddiford, formerly Dinham née Orchard
- Children: 6
- Parents: John Foster (father); Jane Foster née Dowbiggin (mother)

John Foster (1792–1875) was the eldest son of a Yorkshire farmer and landowner who came to Tasmania as a free settler in 1823, with his widowed mother, Jane, and youngest brother, Henry. The family received grants of land near Campbell Town where they became successful farmers. Foster later expanded his business interests by acquiring landholdings in Victoria, by trading goods he produced and by becoming a shipowner. He was appointed a Justice of the Peace in 1836 and, between 1866 and 1874, he represented Huon electoral division on the Tasmanian Legislative Council

== Early years ==
John Foster was the eldest son of John Foster (1758–1816), a farmer and landowner of Armitstead Hall, Settle, Yorkshire, England, and his wife Jane, née Dowbiggin. Armitstead Hall was a spacious home at the centre of an estate of about 370 acres. Foster was educated at Heath School, Halifax, and Kemplay's Academy, Leeds with the expectation that he would follow his father to manage the family's farm and other landholdings. However, his father's death, at the age of 57, occurred just after the end of the Napoleonic Wars and coincided with a severe decline in England's rural economy that depressed product and land values for over a decade. Debts had previously been incurred in efforts to expand and develop the family estate but interest payments, together with falling returns from produce and difficulty in collecting rent from tenants, placed major pressures on the family's finances.

Adding to those pressures was the need to establish the legal career of Foster's younger brother William (1794-1866), who had studied at Cambridge and was, by then in London. William Foster became Solicitor General for New South Wales in 1827 and pursued a legal and political career in Sydney until 1854.

Foster's youngest brother, Henry (1809–1876), was much younger and therefore still living with his mother and eldest brother. Faced with the reality that the family estate in Yorkshire was uneconomic, Foster sought other options for his future, including employment, but finally chose emigration to Tasmania in 1822.

== Emigration to Tasmania ==
Foster, his mother Jane and younger brother, Henry, sailed from London in December 1822, aboard the Berwick, and arrived the following June. On arrival, Foster and his mother were each granted adjoining holdings of 500 acres, fronting onto the Macquarie River, near what was to become Campbell Town. Together they built a house that they named Fosterville. By 1827 the family had grants totalling 1,500 acres adjoining Fosterville and 12,000 acres at Cape Portland.

== Business expansion ==
Foster's farming enterprises in Tasmania were successful. Early in the 1840s, he sought to expand by acquiring landholdings in Gippsland, Victoria, and was soon exporting sheep and wool from them. In 1845 he purchased the ship Joseph Cripps for the trade between Gippsland and Tasmania, and later also the Lady Loch and schooner Mary Ann. In Tasmania, he became a grain exporter and also built and operated a hotel at Port Albert.

In Hobart, Foster became a director of several companies with interests in transport, coal, gas, insurance and banking and built a home there.

By 1853, John Foster was described in a newspaper article about his brother, William, as "a large landed proprietor in Van Dieman's Land and Gipp's Land, and well known to mercantile men in Sydney as one of the wealthiest men in the three colonies".

== Public service ==
Foster was appointed a Justice in of the Peace in 1836 and became police magistrate for the Sorell and Prosser River districts. In 1868 he was elected to represent the Huon district in the Legislative Council and served until 1874.

== Private life ==
In 1863 Foster married Ann Riddiford, a widow, with whom he already had two sons, born in 1860 and 1862. Together, they eventually had six children, four sons and two daughters, but the eldest died in an accident when he was only six years old. John Foster died at Hobart on 27 June 1875, and was buried in the family vault at Cornelian Bay Church of England cemetery.

== Legacy ==
Foster's will made provision for his children to be educated in England, so, in 1876 his widow set off with her five surviving children. She set up home in Brighton and lived there until her death in 1882.

Foster left a substantial estate of land holdings and other assets that would only be finally distributed after his youngest son reached the age of 21 in 1889. Subsequent generations of the Foster family continued to prosper and, at the beginning of the 21st century, one of his descendants was listed among Australia's 200 wealthiest citizens.

One of Foster's grandsons, Francis Foster, served as member of the Tasmanian House of Assembly between 1937 and 1941.

Tasmanian Legislative Council
Preceded by John Wedge	Member for Huon; 1843 – 1874	Succeeded by James Robertson
