= David Calvert (Australian politician) =

Australian politician

David Charles Hedley Calvert (8 May 1875 – 17 October 1924) was an Australian politician.

He was born at South Arm, Tasmania. In May 1924 he was elected to the Tasmanian Legislative Council as the independent member for Huon, but he died at Waterloo in October of that year. He was succeeded by his brother William.

Tasmanian Legislative Council
Preceded by Stafford Bird	Member for Huon; 1924	Succeeded by William Calvert
