= Stafford Bird =

Australian politician

[[File:Stafford Bird.jpg|thumb|right|{{center| Stafford Bird
1924 } }]] Bolton Stafford Bird CMG (30 January 1840 – 15 December 1924) was an English-born Australian Congregationalist clergyman, farmer and politician.

== Life ==
Bird was born in Hazlerigg, Northumberland, the son of the local schoolmaster. In 1852 the family emigrated to Australia and began farming at Clunes, Victoria. In 1865 Bird was ordained in the Wesleyan Methodist Church, but in 1867 transferred to the Congregational Church as minister of the church at Ballarat. In 1870 he took charge of several churches in the Avoca district.

In 1874 he took over the church in Davey Street, Hobart, Tasmania, but resigned in 1877 due to ill-health and bought a farm near Geeveston in the Huon district. He grew apples, which he began to ship to England, thus becoming a pioneer of the Tasmanian apple export industry. In August 1891, however, the Bank of Van Diemen's Land, with whom Bird held a mortgage, collapsed and he lost the farm, moving to a much smaller property at Lunawanna on Bruny Island.

In 1882, Bird was elected to the Tasmanian House of Assembly for Franklin. In 1887 he became Treasurer in Philip Fysh's ministry, serving until Fysh's defeat in 1892. He then served as Leader of the Opposition until 1894 and then Speaker of the House of Assembly until December 1896. He was Treasurer again under Sir Elliott Lewis from 1899 to 1903. From 1904 to 1909 he represented South Hobart. In 1909 he was elected to the upper house, the Legislative Council, and retired in 1923.

Bird was appointed Companion of the Order of St Michael and St George (CMG) in the 1920 New Year Honours.

== Private life ==
He married Sarah Chisholm from Scotland. They had three children beginning with the future headmistress May Isabella in 1868.

== Footnotes ==
Tasmanian Legislative Council
Preceded by Thomas Fisher	Member for Huon; 1909–1924	Succeeded by David Calvert
