= Tom Knight =

Tom or Thomas Knight may refer to:

== Politicians ==
- Thomas Knight (Australian politician) (born 1935), Australian politician
- Thomas Knight (MP for Shrewsbury) (c. 1475–1518/20), English politician
- Thomas Knight (MP for Kent) (1735–1794), English politician
- Thomas Knight (MP for Canterbury) (c. 1701–1781), English politician
- Thomas E. Knight Jr. (1898–1937), American lawyer and politician
- T. Fenton Knight, member of the California State Assembly
- Thomas Knight (Newfoundland politician)
- Thomas John Knight (1804–1870), English politician in Tasmania

== Sports ==
- Tommy Knight (footballer) (1865–?), English footballer
- Tom Knight (cricketer) (born 1993), Derbyshire cricket player
- Tom Knight (American football) (born 1974), former American football cornerback

== Actors ==
- Thomas Knight (actor) (died 1820), English actor and dramatist
- Tom Knight (actor), played Mr Granger in Harry Potter and the Chamber of Secrets
- Tommy Knight (born 1993), child actor, best known for playing Luke Smith in The Sarah Jane Adventures

== Others ==
- Thomas Andrew Knight (1759–1838), horticulturalist and botanist
- Tom Knight (scientist), American computer scientist
- Thomas Knight (murderer) (1951–2014), American fugitive executed in Florida
- Thomas Frederick Knight (1828-1902), Canadian naturalist and author
