= Willie Phua =

Singaporean photojournalist (1928–2024)

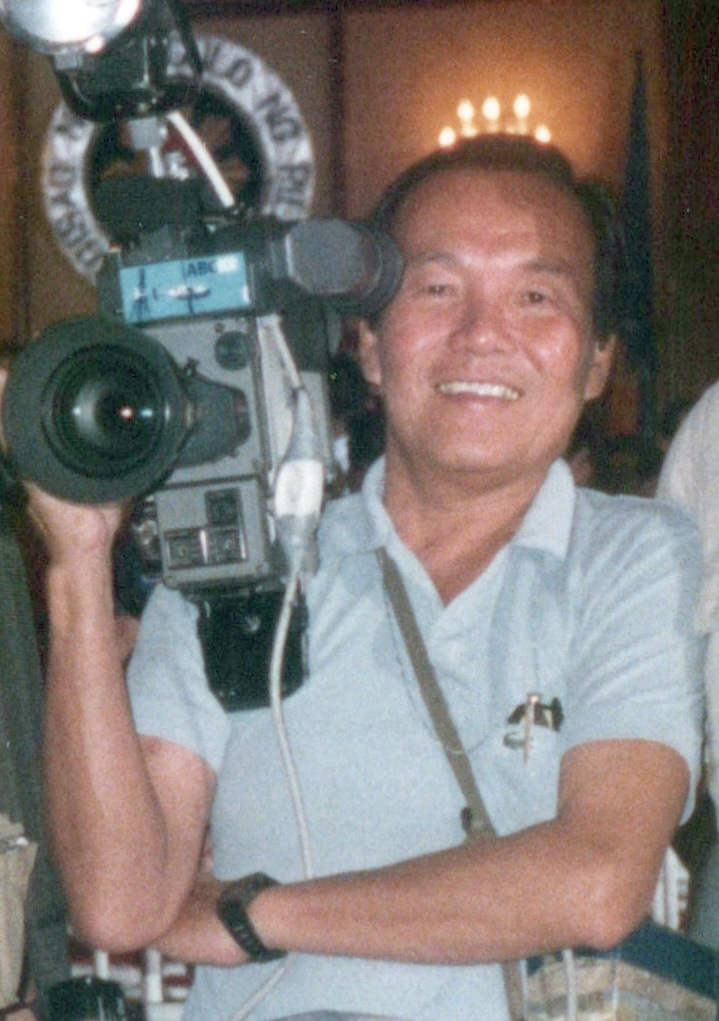
- Phua in the Philippines during the 1986 presidential elections
- Born: Phua Tin Tua; 20 February 1928; Bai Siew Swee (白树村, "White Tree Village"), Hainan Island, China
- Died: 17 December 2024 (aged 96); Singapore
- Other names: "Uncle Willie" and "Pork Chop Phua"
- Occupation: Photojournalist
- Agent: Australian Broadcasting Corporation (ABC)
- Spouse: Cindy Phua
- Children: 1, daughter Tinika (deceased)
- Relatives: 'brother' cousin and cameraman Phua Tin Loon and Loon's cameramen sons Sebastian Phua (deceased); Joe Phua; Jason Phua.

Willie Phua Tin Tua (Note: Chinese: 潘先绰; Hainanese Transliteration Scheme: Fua^{1} Din^{8} Dua^{1}; pinyin: Pān Xiānchuò) (20 February 1928 – 17 December 2024) was a Chinese-born Singaporean photojournalist who was known for his news and feature work covering poignant moments in Asian history over more than three decades. He was the subject of an Australian book published in 2010 called Capturing Asia, by former foreign correspondent Bob Wurth. During his years working on risky assignments, Phua captured many images of wars and uprisings, economic 'miracles' and social upheavals, and the rise and fall of dictators.

Phua's camerawork was seen in Australia through the Australian Broadcasting Corporation, but his most important assignments were also shown around the world, sometimes on the BBC. He was one of the few television cameramen to capture the "Tank Man" briefly holding back Chinese tanks near Tiananmen Square in Beijing in 1989.

== Early years ==
In 1933, Phua came from Hainan Island to Singapore with his mother, Phua Tan Tee, to join his father Phua Gee Wah, at the age of five to find a better life in the British colony. Hainan at that time was wracked by insurgency and the island was swept by damaging typhoons.

Phua had clear recollections as a youth of the Japanese invasion of Singapore and the subsequent occupation of the island in 1942. On the morning of 8 December 1941, a bomb whistled down and crashed into a well near the servants' quarters in the League of Nations compound off River Valley Road where Phua lived. Japan's war had come to Singapore. To the dismay of his mother, Phua, aged 12, ran into the compound and picked up a piece of still-warm metal, a fragment from one of the first Japanese bombs to fall on Singapore: "I was a little bit frightened but also excited. This was something exciting for a boy of my age. It was the first bombing attack on Singapore. We didn’t know the Japanese were coming here until these bombs fell."

Phua still remembered during the invasion of Singapore, watching the retreat of the British and Australians through the streets and a young, bewildered Allied soldier sitting in the gutter, weeping. During the invasion, Phua's neighbourhood was shelled by Japanese artillery. He survived by crouching in a stinking storm drain on Killinery Road with his mother. One shell landed nearby killing a neighbour.

During the Japanese occupation, the youth traded in cigarettes and was chased by Japanese soldiers when plying his trade: "I passed a Japanese soldier with his rifle over his shoulder. In the usual way, I asked if he had any tobacco. He looked at me and suddenly lifted his hand and took a big swing at my face. I ducked to avoid it. As I was turning around to run I saw him take the rifle from his shoulder. I ran for my life. I was terrified." Young Phua escaped and changed his trading habits. His mother made curry puffs and Phua sold them to Australian prisoners-of-war being marched through the streets.

Phua's mother obtained work as a cook in the kitchen of Japanese brothels in Cairnhill Road and the young Phua became her messenger. He recalled the sadness of some of the so-called "comfort women", the Koreans forced into prostitution by the Japanese: "I did errands for the girls and would also buy things for the Japanese soldiers. The girls always seemed to want food. When the women had a Japanese client, especially if they had found a captain or a higher rank, they would say ‘I’m hungry’ and ask the soldiers to buy noodles for them."

== Post-war ==
After the war, Phua became a salesman at Singapore's Amateur Photo Shop, before becoming a freelance cameraman in the early 1960s with Singapore's RTV and BCINA (British Commonwealth International News Agency) which later became Visnews (now Reuters Television) and Australian Broadcasting Corporation (ABC).

== Major assignments ==
On the first day he signed up as a freelance cameraman for Radio Television Singapore (RTS) in 1963, a large fire broke out at the Bukit Ho Swee squatter settlement in Singapore. Quickly on the scene, he captured the population fleeing the flames and his film was shown on RTS within a few hours. Four people were killed, 85 injured and 16,000 shanty houses were destroyed.

Phua went on to cover violent race riots in Singapore and Kuala Lumpur and clashes in Borneo as Indonesia's President Sukarno pressed his Konfrontasi, or Confrontation policy, with the newly established Malaysia.

In 1971, he filmed Pakistani Army killings during the birth of the new state of Bangladesh, then East Pakistan. Phua's then correspondent on the assignment, Australian Don Hook, remembers: "From the roof of the Inter-Continental Hotel in Dacca, Phua shot graphic film of horrific events in the street below. Soldiers had deliberately set fire to a newspaper building. As newspaper staff ran from the blazing building there were bursts of automatic fire followed by screams and calls for help." Hook and Phua, along with other media people, were rounded up and forced to fly out of the country.

Phua had seven lengthy assignments to cover the Vietnam War during 1971 and 1972. Once working with ABC correspondent Athol Meyer he was shelled at an American base in the central highlands. He was almost killed in the war in April 1972 when the South Vietnamese patrol boat he was aboard came under machine gun and rocket fire on the Saigon River. The patrol boat's gunner was the first to be hit by Viet Cong fire and lost a leg. Then Phua's sound recordist was severely wounded in the leg.

Phua covered the major riots in Manila which followed the assassination of opposition leader Benigno Aquino at Manila International Airport in August 1983. While filming the shooting of demonstrators by soldiers at Mendiola Bridge near the presidential palace that year, he was hit by a hail of rocks, but his injuries were not major.

Phua was known to many Asian leaders over the years. Indian Prime Minister Indira Gandhi would welcome him in New Delhi with the words: "Ah, my good Chinese friend." Says Phua: "Frankly, I think she was a nice person." Philippines foreign minister Carlos Romulo would single him out in a press pack and take him aside for a chat. ABC correspondent Peter Munckton recalled the Philippines' first lady Imelda Marcos doing the same.

The last time he saw Indira Gandhi, he filmed her prone on her death bed after being assassinated by her Sikh bodyguards in 1984.

Phua covered the funeral rites for Gandhi and the subsequent genocide against the Sikhs in New Delhi and elsewhere in India following the assassination. Rioting, burning of buildings and general lawlessness spread throughout New Delhi. The chief of Network Australia, the ABC's overseas TV service, Bruce Dover, was then a correspondent working alongside Phua: "There was a mob hauling the Sikhs from their homes and breaking their legs so that they couldn’t run away, then pouring oil over them to burn them alive. They were mostly Sikh men but also Sikh boys." Phua filmed the mayhem: "I remember seeing bodies everywhere. It was so gruesome. I only wanted to shoot a little bit—a few wide shots because you couldn’t show the close-ups and then I just wanted to get out of there...The odd policeman just stood around, doing nothing."

The ABC's long-time New Delhi driver, Joseph Madan, who still works for the ABC in New Delhi, says Phua saved his life. Phua was surrounded by angry mobs on several occasions and repeatedly put his life at risk. He filmed truck loads of the bodies of Sikhs, including children, who had been burned to death in Delhi.

Among the many memorable images he captured were those of a lone bag-carrying demonstrator known as Tank Man confronting People's Liberation Army (PLA) tanks during Beijing's Tiananmen Square uprising in 1989. The ABC's bureau chief in Asia at the time, Tony Eastley, says he believes there were two television cameramen who captured the iconic television images of the 'tank man'; Phua and an American cameraman. CNN cameraman Jonathon Schaer told Phua's biographer that he also shot the famous tank scene from a balcony in the same hotel as Phua.

Phua as he filmed could not help acknowledge the bravery of the man holding up the tanks: Outside on the balcony I can see all the tanks coming up and this one single student standing in front of it. I think he is thinking, ‘Run me down if you can!’ And the first tank stopped exactly in front of him and there was some talking going on. And the next thing, he is climbing on top of the tank and he is speaking with the driver. Later on he climbed down and he's still standing in front of the tank."

Phua felt his life had been blessed, as he had many close calls to death in his photojournalist career, according to friend and colleague, John McBeth, writing in Singapore's Straits Times newspaper. Like one time a Vietcong ambush came upon him while filming a German documentary aboard a South Vietnamese patrol boat in the Mekong Delta in 1971.

For everything else, McBeth said, Phua's formula for success in getting the right scoop lay in the planning on how to seize the best vantage point. For instance, he recalled, Phua spent much of his time getting access to a block of flats to get a good elevated shot of the prison to cover the news of the hanging of two Australian traffickers in Kuala Lumpur in 1986, for ABC. He also attributed calm and reasoning wit to getting things to work his way, especially towards handling brushes with authorities.

== Retirement from television ==
Phua worked as a cameraman throughout Asia for well over three decades when he was pressured into retirement by a back that could no longer carry heavy camera equipment. He realised the need to retire when climbing Japan's Mount Fuji in 1993 on an assignment with ABC Tokyo correspondent Philip Williams and sound recordist Jone Chang, as Williams recalls: "As you get higher, it gets harder ... we were going with Willie and a couple of others and we were all carrying gear. There were ten stations to go through. Willie finally said, ‘You’ll have to go on without me.' It was in fact the end of the road for him, I think, symbolically and in a very real sense. He left the ABC and the industry very shortly after that."

Phua was later invited to join the board of a Malaysian finance and entertainment company, DKH-George Town Holdings group, chaired by Tunku Abdullah.

== Recognition ==
In November 1996, Phua received the Honorary Medal of the Order of Australia for his services. The citation for Phua's award read:‘Mr Phua’s camera work has been responsible for Australians seeing all aspects of life in Asia, thus stimulating Australian interest in the region.’ The award was presented by New South Wales Governor Gordon Samuels. In 1993, Phua officially retired from his news-hunting days.

In a foreword to Phua's biography in 2010, the managing director of the Australian Broadcasting Corporation, Mark Scott, said Phua was long regarded as one of the finest news cameramen in Asia: "From 1963 on, so much of what Australians learnt and understood about Asia came to them through the lens of an unseen yet unforgettable Chinese-born cameraman called Willie Phua."

== Death ==
Phua died on 17 December 2024, at the age of 96.

== Quotes ==
- He taught us civility, diplomacy, a touch of humility and to accept that other people had to retain face.' In other words, the essentials for covering the region.—Peter Munckton, ABC correspondent who covered the Vietnam War news.
- Here you had a gifted cinematographer with a keen eye for news, steeped in the history of his working environment and all its sensitivities, willingly moulding and protecting a string of young, ambitious Australians on their foreign assignments.—Paul Lockyer, ABC correspondent.

== Sources ==
- Wurth, Bob, 'Capturing Asia, An ABC cameraman's journey through momentous events and turbulent history', ABC Books (HarperCollins) Sydney, 2010, 436 pp.
