= William Calvert (Australian politician) =

Australian politician

William Henry Fairfax Calvert (14 February 1871 – 8 June 1942) was an Australian politician.

He was born in South Arm, Tasmania. In 1924 he was elected to the Tasmanian Legislative Council as the independent member for Huon, succeeding his brother David. He held the seat until his retirement in 1942; he died a month later in Hobart.

Tasmanian Legislative Council
Preceded by David Calvert	Member for Huon; 1924–1942	Succeeded by Rowland Worsley
