= Rowland Worsley =

Australian politician

Rowland Leonard Worsley (12 July 1907 – ?) was an Australian politician.

He was born in Margate. In 1942 he was elected to the Tasmanian Legislative Council as the Labor member for Huon. He served as a minister from 1946 until 1948, when he lost his seat.

Tasmanian Legislative Council
Preceded by William Calvert	Member for Huon; 1942–1948	Succeeded by Ron Brown
