= Clare Glade-Wright =

Australian politician

The Honourable Clare Glade-Wright MLC

Member of the Tasmanian Legislative Council for Huon
- Incumbent
- Assumed office 2 May 2026
- Preceded by: Dean Harriss

Personal details
- Party: Independent

Clare Glade-Wright is an Australian politician representing Huon in the Tasmanian Legislative Council since the 2026 Tasmanian Legislative Council periodic election. Prior to this she was deputy Mayor and a member of Kingborough Council.

Civic offices
Preceded by Dean Harriss	Member for Huon; 2026–present	Incumbent
