= Dean Harriss =

Australian politician

Member of the Tasmanian Legislative Council for Huon
- In office 7 May 2022 – 2 May 2026
- Preceded by: Bastian Seidel
- Succeeded by: Clare Glade-Wright

Personal details
- Born: 18 June 1981 (age 44) Hobart, Tasmania
- Party: Independent
- Parent: Paul Harriss (father)

Dean Andrew Harriss (born 18 June 1981) is an Australian politician. At a May 2022 by-election, he was elected to the Tasmanian Legislative Council as the independent member for Huon, following the resignation of Labor-turned-independent MLC Bastian Seidel.

Harriss is the son of former Huon MLC Paul Harriss.

He was defeated at the 2026 Tasmanian Legislative Council periodic election by independent Clare Glade-Wright.

Tasmanian Legislative Council
Preceded by Bastian Seidel	Member for Huon; 2022–2026	Succeeded by Clare Glade-Wright
