= Peter Hodgman =

Australian politician

Peter Curtis Leigh Hodgman (born 25 May 1946) is a former Australian politician. He is the son of Bill Hodgman, the brother of Michael Hodgman and the uncle of former Tasmanian Premier Will Hodgman.

Hodgman first entered politics in 1974, when he was elected to the Tasmanian Legislative Council as the member for Huon. Like most MLCs, he was elected as an independent. In 1986 he resigned his seat to contest the House of Assembly seat of Franklin as a Liberal, successfully. From February to December 1991, he served as Deputy Leader of the Opposition. His nephew, Will, occupied the same position between 2002 and 2006.

Peter Hodgman resigned his seat on 8 October 2001 to contest the federal seat of Franklin at the 2001 federal election, but he was defeated by sitting Labor MP Harry Quick.

Hodgman had earlier been approached in 1992 by then Federal Liberal Leader John Hewson to run in Franklin at the 1993 election but Hodgman declined. It was at the 1993 election that Quick first won the seat.

In December 2013 it was announced he would be contesting the seat of Huon in the Tasmanian Legislative Council as an endorsed Liberal, but he was defeated by Robert Armstrong, an independent.

Tasmanian Legislative Council
Preceded by Michael Hodgman	Member for Huon; 1974–1986	Succeeded by Athol Meyer
