= Jo Palmer =

Australian politician (born 1971)

The Honourable Jo Palmer MLC

Deputy Leader of the Government in the Tasmanian Legislative Council
- Incumbent
- Assumed office 11 April 2024
- Premier: Jeremy Rockliff
- Leader: Leonie Hiscutt; Tania Rattray

Minister for Education
- Incumbent
- Assumed office 11 April 2024
- Premier: Jeremy Rockliff
- Preceded by: Roger Jaensch (as Minister for Education, Children and Youth)

Minister for Disability Services
- Incumbent
- Assumed office 12 April 2022
- Premier: Jeremy Rockliff
- Preceded by: Madeleine Ogilvie

Minister for Women and the Prevention of Family Violence
- In office 20 October 2024 – 7 October 2025
- Premier: Jeremy Rockliff
- Preceded by: Madeleine Ogilvie
- Succeeded by: Jane Howlett

Member of the Tasmanian Legislative Council for Rosevears
- Incumbent
- Assumed office 1 August 2020
- Preceded by: Kerry Finch

Personal details
- Born: Joanne Lesley Dick; 10 April 1971 (age 55) Christchurch, New Zealand
- Party: Liberal Party
- Spouse: Andrew Palmer (m. 2007)
- Occupation: Television journalist and newsreader

Joanne Lesley Palmer (née Dick, formerly Cornish; born 10 April 1971) is an Australian politician and former television journalist and newsreader.

Palmer was born in Christchurch, New Zealand, and moved to Tasmania as a baby after being adopted by an Australian family.

Palmer is a former Miss Tasmania and in 1993 she was awarded Miss Australia.

Palmer was originally employed by 7 Tasmania (then Southern Cross Television) in Hobart as a journalist, before she later presented the stations flagship Nightly News on 7 Tasmania (now 7NEWS Tasmania) for 18 years, until leaving the station in February 2020.

Palmer was elected to the Tasmanian Legislative Council for the division of Rosevears at the 2020 Tasmanian Legislative Council periodic election, representing the Liberal Party.

In April 2022, Palmer was elevated to cabinet and was appointed as Minister for Primary Industries and Water, Minister for Disability Services and Minister for Women.

Palmer was re-elected to Rosevears at the 2026 Legislative Council elections.

Tasmanian Legislative Council
Preceded by Kerry Finch	Member for Rosevears; 2020–present	Incumbent
