= Robert Armstrong (Australian politician) =

Australian politician

The Honourable Robert Armstrong MLC

Member of the Tasmanian Legislative Council for Huon
- In office 3 May 2014 – 1 August 2020
- Preceded by: Paul Harriss
- Succeeded by: Bastian Seidel

Personal details
- Born: Robert Henry Armstrong; 1 October 1952 (age 73) Hobart
- Party: Independent

Robert Henry Armstrong (born 1 October 1952) is an Australian politician. He was elected to the Tasmanian Legislative Council on 3 May 2014 as the independent member for Huon, defeating high-profile Liberal opponent Peter Hodgman. Prior to his election he served as mayor of Huon Valley Council for 13 years. He was defeated in 2020 by Labor candidate Bastian Seidel.

Tasmanian Legislative Council
Preceded by Paul Harriss	Member for Huon; 2014–2020	Succeeded by Bastian Seidel
