= Kerry Finch =

Australian politician (born 1948)

The Honourable Kerry Finch OAM

Member of the Tasmanian Legislative Council for Rosevears
- In office 4 May 2002 – 22 June 2020
- Preceded by: Ray Bailey
- Succeeded by: Jo Palmer

Personal details
- Born: 4 November 1948 (age 77) Hobart, Tasmania
- Party: Independent
- Website: www.kerryfinch.com

Kerry Finch OAM (born 4 November 1948) is a former member of the Tasmanian Legislative Council or upper house for the electoral division of Rosevears, which mainly comprises the western side of the Tamar River valley from West Launceston up to Greens Beach. He was first elected on 4 May 2002, and retired in 2020.

Prior to this he worked in the media including 7HT Hobart, 2MW Murwillumbah, 2 km Kempsey, 7LA Launceston, ABC Radio Tasmania and WIN Television. Kerry had his own media company Kerry Finch Media from 2000 to 2002.

Finch was born in Hobart on 4 November 1948 and married Carole in 1979. He has three sons Brian, Adrian and David. His interests include sport, theatre, travelling and Tasmania in general.

Finch sees himself as a community representative and has championed the environment of the Tamar Valley and the health of the Tamar River. He was the instigator and chairman of a select committee which recommended that the Tamar and its catchments should be managed by a single statutory authority.

Kerry Finch is regarded as one of the least conservative of the Legislative Council's independent members. He voted for legislation in support of the Deeds of Relationship Bill for same sex unions and opposed the Sex Industry Offences Bill 2005. He has also supported Aboriginal Land Rights legislation, which culminated in the handover of Cape Barren Island. He also voted against the Pulp Mill process coming through parliament and subsequently against the establishment of the Pulp Mill in the Tamar Valley.

He won re-election in 2014.

Finch was awarded the Medal of the Order of Australia in the 2023 King's Birthday Honours for "service to the Parliament of Tasmania, and to the community".

Tasmanian Legislative Council
Preceded by Ray Bailey	Member for Rosevears; 2002–2020	Succeeded by Jo Palmer
