= Paul Harriss =

Australian politician (1954–2022)

Minister for Resources
- In office 31 March 2014 – 18 February 2016
- Premier: Will Hodgman
- Preceded by: Bryan Green
- Succeeded by: Adam Brooks

Member of the Tasmanian House of Assembly for Franklin
- In office 15 March 2014 – 18 February 2016
- Succeeded by: Nic Street

Member of the Tasmanian Legislative Council for Huon
- In office 25 May 1996 – 24 February 2014
- Preceded by: Athol Meyer
- Succeeded by: Robert Armstrong

Personal details
- Born: Andrew Paul Harriss; 11 August 1954 Franklin, Tasmania, Australia
- Died: 1 October 2022 (aged 68)
- Party: Liberal Party
- Other political affiliations: Independent
- Occupation: Draftsman

Andrew Paul Harriss (11 August 1954 – 1 October 2022) was an Australian politician. He was a Liberal Party member of the Tasmanian House of Assembly from March 2014 to February 2016, representing the electorate of Franklin.

Harriss was an independent member of the Tasmanian Legislative Council from 1996 to 2014, amassing a lengthy conservative voting record. He resigned from the Legislative Council in 2014, a short time before the conclusion of his Legislative Council term, in order to contest the House of Assembly election as a Liberal. He had previously lost a race as a Liberal candidate at the 1996 Tasmanian election. After the Liberals won the 2014 election, he was appointed Minister for Resources. In that role, he generated criticism for his combative stance against environmentalists.

On 17 February 2016, Harriss announced that he was resigning from the Hodgman ministry and from the parliament, effective the next day. Kingborough Council councillor Nic Street was elected in a countback to fill the vacancy on 1 March 2016.

Harriss died on 1 October 2022.

Tasmanian Legislative Council
Preceded by Athol Meyer	Member for Huon; 1996–2014	Succeeded by Robert Armstrong
Political offices
Preceded by Bryan Green	Minister for Resources; 2014–2016	Succeeded by Adam Brooks as Minister for Mining
