= Electoral division of Rosevears =

Tasmanian Legislative Council electoral division

Rosevears Tasmania—Legislative Council
- Map showing the electoral division of Rosevears, as of the 2017 periodic review.
- State: Tasmania
- MP: Jo Palmer
- Party: Liberal
- Namesake: Rosevears, Tasmania
- Electors: 27,503 (July 2020)
- Area: 802 km^{2} (309.7 sq mi)
- Demographic: Rural
- Federal electorate: Bass
- Coordinates: 41.273°S 146.871°E
Electorates around Rosevears:
Bass Strait	Bass Strait	Bass Strait
Mersey	Rosevears	Windermere
McIntyre	McIntyre	Launceston

The electoral division of Rosevears is one of the 15 electorates or 'seats' in the Tasmanian upper house. The division is located on the west side of the Tamar River. It is named after the town of Rosevears which is located on the river banks near Exeter.

The electoral boundaries include the towns of Exeter, Rowella, Sidmouth, Legana, Bridgenorth, Gravelly Beach, Greens Beach, Beaconsfield, Glengarry, Beauty point and Clarence point. The division also includes the Launceston suburbs of West Launceston, Riverside, Summerhill, Trevallyn and Glen Dhu.

The current sitting member for Rosevears is Liberal member Jo Palmer who has held the seat since 2020. The next election in Rosevears is due in 2026. The number of enrolled electors in the division was 27,503 in July 2020.

== History ==
The division was created in 1999 after a reduction in the size of parliament. Rosevears includes most localities from the former Division of Cornwall. Localities in the West Tamar region that were once a part of the Division of Roland were also added into Rosevears. The division also acquired suburbs from the abolished Division of Launceston.

When the electorate was created; Ray Bailey who was the member for Cornwall was automatically made member for Rosevears. In the first election, held in 2002, he retired and Kerry Finch was elected instead. This election had a low voter turnout, despite voting being compulsory, which was attributed to confusion as to which electorate people were located in.

== Members ==
Member	Party	Period
Ray Bailey	Independent	1999–2002
Kerry Finch	Independent	2002–2020
Jo Palmer	Liberal	2020–present

== Election results ==
2020 Tasmanian Legislative Council periodic elections: Rosevears
Party	Candidate	Votes	%	±%
Liberal	Jo Palmer	9,492	41.52	+1.80
Independent	Janie Finlay	6,915	30.24	+30.24
Labor	Jess Greene	2,076	9.08	+9.08
Independent	David Fry	1,907	8.34	+8.34
Greens	Jack Davenport	1,713	7.49	+7.49
Independent	Vivienne Gale	761	3.33	+3.33
Total formal votes		22,864	98.02	+1.59
Informal votes		462	1.98	−1.59
Turnout		23,326	84.81	+3.49
Registered electors		27,503		
Two-candidate-preferred result
Liberal	Jo Palmer	11,492	50.57	+10.85
Independent	Janie Finlay	11,232	49.43	+49.43
Liberal gain from Independent				

== See also ==
- Tasmanian House of Assembly
