= Electoral division of Huon =

Tasmanian Legislative Council electoral division

Huon Tasmania—Legislative Council
- Map showing the electoral division of Huon, as of the 2017 periodic review.
- State: Tasmania
- Created: 1856
- MP: Clare Glade-Wright
- Party: Independent
- Electors: 28,631 (2026)
- Area: 6,214 km^{2} (2,399.2 sq mi)
- Demographic: Rural
- Federal electorate(s): Clark; Franklin
- Coordinates: 43.248°S 146.67°E
Electorates around Huon:
Murchison	Derwent; Elwick	Hobart; Nelson
Murchison	Huon	Storm Bay
Southern Ocean	Southern Ocean	Southern Ocean

The electoral division of Huon is one of the 15 electoral divisions in the Tasmanian Legislative Council. It was created in 1999, however similar electorates of this name have existed since 1900, and members of the Tasmanian upper house for this region appear to have been elected since 1856.

The total area of the division is 6,214 square kilometres (2,399 sq mi) since a redistribution in August 2017.

As of the 2026 election, there were 28,631 enrolled voters in the division. The current sitting member of the division is Clare Glade-Wright, elected in the 2026 periodic election. The next periodic election in the division is due in May 2032.

The division includes the local municipalities of Huon Valley and Kingborough. Localities include Huonville, Margate, Cygnet, Franklin, Geeveston, Bruny Island, Snug, and Howden.

== Members ==
Member	Party	Period
Thomas John Knight	Independent	1856–1857
Richard Cleburne	Independent	1857–1864
Alexander Kissock	Independent	1864–1866
John Wedge	Independent	1866–1868
John Foster	Independent	1868–1874
James Robertson	Independent	1874–1880
Joseph Solomon	Independent	1880
William Fisher	Independent	1881–1882
John Watchorn	Independent	1882–1905
Thomas Fisher	Independent	1905–1909
Stafford Bird	Independent	1909–1924
David Calvert	Independent	1924
William Calvert	Independent	1924–1942
Rowland Worsley	Labor	1942–1948
Ron Brown	Independent	1948–1966
Michael Hodgman	Independent	1966–1974
Peter Hodgman	Independent	1974–1986
Athol Meyer	Independent	1986–1996
Paul Harriss	Independent	1996–2014
Robert Armstrong	Independent	2014–2020
Bastian Seidel	Labor	2020–2022
Dean Harriss	Independent	2022–2026
Clare Glade-Wright	Independent	2026–present

== Election results ==
2026 Tasmanian Legislative Council periodic elections: Huon
Party	Candidate	Votes	%	±%
Independent	Dean Harriss	7,107	30.81	+14.67
Independent	Clare Glade-Wright	6,330	27.45	+27.45
Labor	Abby McKibben	3,843	16.66	−14.63
Greens	Paul Gibson	3,468	15.04	−2.50
Independent	Michael Rowan	1,237	5.36	+5.36
Independent	Tyler Petersen	1,079	4.68	+4.68
Total formal votes		23,064	95.57	−1.86
Informal votes		1,068	4.43	+1.86
Turnout		24,132	84.29	−1.28
Registered electors		28,631		
Two-candidate-preferred result
Independent	Clare Glade-Wright	11,988	52.49	+52.49
Independent	Dean Harriss	10,849	47.51	+47.51
Independent gain from Independent				

Swings calculated against the 2020 election.

== See also ==
- Tasmanian House of Assembly
